= National Register of Historic Places listings in Ripley County, Indiana =

Location of Ripley County in Indiana

This is a list of the National Register of Historic Places listings in Ripley County, Indiana.

This is intended to be a complete list of the properties on the National Register of Historic Places in Ripley County, Indiana, United States. Latitude and longitude coordinates are provided for many National Register properties; these locations may be seen together in a map.

There are 17 properties listed on the National Register in the county.

Properties and districts located in incorporated areas display the name of the municipality, while properties and districts in unincorporated areas display the name of their civil township. Properties and districts split between multiple jurisdictions display the names of all jurisdictions.

This National Park Service list is complete through NPS recent listings posted December 12, 2025.

== Current listings ==
	Name on the Register	Image	Date listed	Location	City or town	Description
1	Busching Covered Bridge	Busching Covered Bridge	March 13, 2019 (#100003509)	E. Perry St./E Cty. Rd. 25 S at Laughery Cr. 39°04′04″N 85°14′16″W	Versailles vicinity	1885 Howe truss bridge, located Versailles State Park.
2	Central Batesville Historic District	Central Batesville Historic District	September 15, 2011 (#11000659)	Roughly bounded by Catherine, Vine, and Boehringer Sts., and Eastern Ave. 39°17′52″N 85°13′19″W	Batesville	
3	Central House	Central House	September 23, 1982 (#82000071)	State Road 229; 39°12′18″N 85°19′42″W	Napoleon	
4	Collin's Ford Bridge	Collin's Ford Bridge	July 30, 1996 (#96000787)	Big Oaks National Wildlife Refuge, approximately 0.75 miles west of New Marion; 39°00′29″N 85°22′14″W	Shelby Township	
5	Elias Conwell House	Elias Conwell House	May 14, 1979 (#79000041)	Wilson St. and U.S. Route 421; 39°12′23″N 85°19′50″W	Napoleon	
6	Friendship Stone Arch Bridge	Friendship Stone Arch Bridge	March 11, 2019 (#100003510)	Olean Rd./Cty Rd. 525 E over Raccoon Cr. 38°58′26″N 85°09′33″W	Friendship vicinity	
7	Marble Creek Bridge	Marble Creek Bridge	July 30, 1996 (#96000785)	Big Oaks National Wildlife Refuge, approximately 0.75 miles west of the junction of G and W. Recovery Rds. 38°55′39″N 85°26′31″W	Shelby Township	
8	Milan Masonic Lodge No. 31	Milan Masonic Lodge No. 31	January 9, 2013 (#12001155)	312 Main St. 39°07′30″N 85°07′54″W	Milan	
9	Old Timbers	Old Timbers	July 30, 1996 (#96000786)	Big Oaks National Wildlife Refuge, approximately 0.5 miles southeast of the junction of K Rd. and Northeast Exit; 39°00′17″N 85°23′26″W	Shelby Township	
10	Otter Creek Covered Bridge	Otter Creek Covered Bridge	March 13, 2019 (#100003511)	N. Cty. Rd. 850 W at Otter Cr. 39°05′07″N 85°24′37″W	Holton vicinity	
11	John Linsey Rand House	John Linsey Rand House	June 10, 1994 (#94000582)	Southwestern corner of the junction of State Road 62 and Maxine Moss Dr. at Friendship; 38°57′57″N 85°08′43″W	Brown Township	
12	Ripley County Courthouse	Ripley County Courthouse	September 24, 2009 (#09000762)	115 N. Main St. 39°04′19″N 85°15′07″W	Versailles	
13	Straber Ford Bridge	Straber Ford Bridge	December 24, 2009 (#09001132)	County Road 500N over Otter Creek, northwest of Osgood; 39°08′53″N 85°21′44″W	Center Township	
14	Fernando G. Taylor House	Fernando G. Taylor House	September 22, 1986 (#86002710)	Northeastern corner of Main and Tyson Sts. 39°04′17″N 85°15′03″W	Versailles	
15	Tyson United Methodist Church	Tyson United Methodist Church	September 8, 1994 (#94001106)	324 W. Tyson St. 39°04′19″N 85°15′14″W	Versailles	
16	Versailles Courthouse Square Historic District		August 21, 2024 (#100010748)	Roughly bounded by East Third North Street on the north, Alley 1-45 on the east, Water Street on the south, and Alley 9-70 on the west 39°04′24″N 85°15′06″W	Versailles	
17	Versailles School and Tyson Auditorium	Versailles School and Tyson Auditorium	April 19, 2006 (#06000309)	100 S. High St. 39°04′18″N 85°15′20″W	Versailles	

== See also ==
- List of National Historic Landmarks in Indiana
- National Register of Historic Places listings in Indiana
- Listings in neighboring counties: Dearborn, Decatur, Franklin, Jefferson, Jennings, Ohio, Switzerland
- List of Indiana state historical markers in Ripley County
