= List of Indiana state historical markers in Ripley County =

Location of Ripley County in Indiana

This is a list of the Indiana state historical markers in Ripley County.

This is intended to be a complete list of the official state historical markers placed in Ripley County, Indiana, United States by the Indiana Historical Bureau. The locations of the historical markers and their latitude and longitude coordinates are included below when available, along with their names, years of placement, and topics as recorded by the Historical Bureau. There are 10 historical markers located in Ripley County.

== Historical markers ==
Marker title	Image	Year placed	Location	Topics
Michigan Road		1949	Junction of U.S. Route 50 and N. Old Michigan Road, 2 miles east of Holton; 39°4′30″N 85°20′55″W	Transportation, American Indian/Native American
Morgan's Raid July 8–13, 1863		1963	Eastern entrance to the Ripley County Courthouse in Versailles; 39°4′19″N 85°15′5″W	Military
Berry's Trace		1972	Junction of Madison (U.S. Route 421) and Wilson Streets in Napoleon; 39°12′22″N 85°19′49.4″W	Transportation, Early Settlement and Exploration
Union Church		2004	6303 County Road 975W at the Flat Rock Road/County Road 650N junction near Flat Rock; 39°9′53″N 85°26′26″W	Underground Railroad, African American
Stephen S. Harding		2004	Junction of Washington and Tyson Streets on the southwestern corner of the courthouse square in Versailles; 39°4′18.4″N 85°15′7.6″W	Underground Railroad, Politics, African American
Ohio and Mississippi Railroad		2006	Southern side of the CSX railroad line, near Walnut Street across from the new extension of the library in Osgood; 39°7′48″N 85°17′31″W	Transportation, Business, Industry, and Labor, Buildings and Architecture
James Harrison Cravens		2006	By Cravens' 1865 home at 324 E. Fairground Avenue in Osgood; 39°7′57″N 85°17′10″W	Politics, Underground Railroad, Military
Bilby Steel Tower		2016	Southwest corner of CR 300 N and US 421, Osgood; 39°07′05″N 85°16′58″W	Science, Medicine, & Invention; Government Institution
Milan Miracle		2022	201 W. Carr St., Milan; 39°07′23″N 85°07′55.3″W	Sports

== See also ==
- List of Indiana state historical markers
- National Register of Historic Places listings in Ripley County, Indiana
