= Rowland H. Jackson =

American educator, attorney, businessman and politician

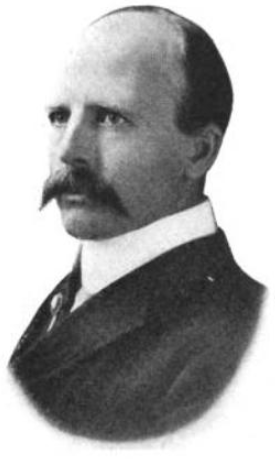

Member of the Indiana Senate from the Jefferson, Ripley, Switzerland district
- In office November 9, 1910 – November 8, 1916

Member of the Indiana Senate from the Franklin, Jennings, Ripley, Union district
- In office November 9, 1916 – November 8, 1918

Personal details
- Born: Rowland Holman Jackson; June 26, 1872 Tanglewood, Indiana, U.S.
- Died: May 1, 1957 (aged 84) Versailles, Indiana, U.S.
- Party: Democratic
- Spouse(s): Georgia W. Frohlinger (1903–1915); Ethel Jaekle (1919–)
- Children: Norris Jackson; Amos Wade Jackson
- Parent(s): Amos Jackson; Mary Wade Jackson
- Education: Indiana Law School
- Occupation: Attorney

Rowland Holman Jackson (June 26, 1872 – May 1, 1957) was an American educator, attorney, businessman and politician. Jackson served as an Indiana State Senator from 1911 until 1917.

== Early life ==
Rowland Holman Jackson was born in Tanglewood in Ripley County, Indiana, on June 26, 1872. His parents were Amos and Mary Wade Jackson.

In his twenties, Jackson was a teacher and school administrator. He taught in Phoenix, Arizona, Bedford, Kentucky, and Ripley County. He left his career in education to work as a clerk for the Baltimore and Ohio Railroad in Indiana. Starting in 1901, he attended Indiana Law School in Indianapolis and was admitted into the Indiana State Bar Association. He graduated in 1903. He married Georgia W. Frohlinger that same year, on September 30.

== Career and life ==
After graduating, he moved to Versailles, Indiana, where he operated his own law firm, Jackson & Jackson. He owned farms, co-owned Jackson Abstracts, Inc., and would serve as president of the Bank of Versailles. With Georgia, he had two sons, Norris and Amos Wade Jackson. The younger, Norris, died as an infant.

He became active politically, serving as Ripley County deputy prosecutor. In 1911, he was elected to the Indiana State Senate. During his tenure, Georgia died in 1915. His term in the Senate ended in 1917. In November 1919, he married Ethel Jaekle.

In May 1924, he announced his candidacy for Sixth Judicial Circuit Judge.

== Later life and death ==
Jackson was a freemason, a member of the Order of the Eastern Star, and was active in the Ripley County Bar Association. He practiced law until he died on May 1, 1957, at his home in Versailles.

== Legacy ==
The Indiana State Library has a collection of documents and archival materials related to Jackson.
