= Otter Creek Township, Indiana =

Otter Creek Township is the name of two townships in Indiana:

- Otter Creek Township, Ripley County, Indiana
- Otter Creek Township, Vigo County, Indiana
