= Amos Jackson =

Amos Jackson may refer to:

- Amos H. Jackson (1846–1924), U.S. Representative from Ohio
- Amos W. Jackson (1904–1972), American judge in Indiana
