= Dabney, Indiana =

- Unincorporated community
- Location within Indiana Location within the United States
- Coordinates: 39°05′24″N 85°20′49″W
- Country: United States
- State: Indiana
- County: Ripley
- Township: Otter Creek
- Elevation: 958 ft (292 m)
- Time zone: UTC-5 (Eastern (EST))
  - Summer (DST): UTC-4 (EDT)
- ZIP code: 47023
- Area codes: 812, 930
- GNIS feature ID: 433280

Dabney is an unincorporated community in Otter Creek Township, Ripley County, in the U.S. state of Indiana.

== History ==
Dabney was originally called Poston, and under the latter name was laid out in 1855.

A post office was established under the name Poston in 1856, was renamed to Dabney in 1897, and remained in operation until it was discontinued in 1934.

== Geography ==
Dabney is located along a railroad line 2.5 miles (4.0 km) northeast of Holton.
