= Ripley County Courthouse =

Ripley County Courthouse may refer to:

- Ripley County Courthouse (Indiana)
- Ripley County Courthouse (Missouri)
