= Correct, Indiana =

- Unincorporated community
- Location within Indiana Location within the United States
- Coordinates: 39°00′31″N 85°17′11″W
- Country: United States
- State: Indiana
- County: Ripley
- Township: Johnson
- Elevation: 971 ft (296 m)
- Time zone: UTC-5 (Eastern (EST))
  - Summer (DST): UTC-4 (EDT)
- ZIP code: 47042
- Area codes: 812, 930
- GNIS feature ID: 432992

Correct is an unincorporated community in Johnson Township, Ripley County, in the U.S. state of Indiana.

== History ==
A post office called Correct was established in 1881, and remained in operation until it was discontinued in 1905.

According to tradition:

When postmaster William Will at Versailles was asked to suggest a name for a new town, established in 1881, he took his inspiration from Halley's comet, which was a popular subject at the time. On the postal form requesting the town's name he wrote "Comet." But Will's handwriting puzzled postal authorities. They returned the card to Will, asking him to verify that the town's name was to be "Comet." "Correct," wrote Will on the card and sent it back to the Post Office Department.

== Geography ==
Correct is located on U.S. Route 421, 4.5 miles (7.2 km) south-southwest of Versailles.
