= Saint Magdalen, Indiana =

- Ghost town
- Location within Indiana Location within the United States
- Coordinates: 38°57′28″N 85°23′29″W
- Country: United States
- State: Indiana
- County: Ripley
- Township: Shelby
- Elevation: 899 ft (274 m)

Population (2023)
  - Total: 0
- Time zone: UTC-5 (Eastern (EST))
  - Summer (DST): UTC-4 (EDT)
- ZIP code: 47250
- Area codes: 812, 930
- GNIS feature ID: 452197

Saint Magdalen is an extinct town in Shelby Township, Ripley County, in the U.S. state of Indiana. It has no permanent residents anymore and is considered a ghost town.

== History ==
A post office opened under the name Saint Magdalen in 1871, and remained in operation until 1905. The community was named after Mary Magdalene.

== Geography ==
Saint Magdalen was located within the present-day boundaries of Big Oaks National Wildlife Refuge.
