= Rexville =

Rexville may refer to:

- Rexville, Indiana, an unincorporated community in Ripley County
- Rexville, New York, a hamlet in Steuben County
- Rexville, Texas, an unincorporated area in Austin County
- Rexville, Bayamón, Puerto Rico, a community in Bayamon, Puerto Rico
