= Jefferson Proving Ground =

Former munitions testing facility in Indiana, US

Coordinates: 39°0′N 85°24′W

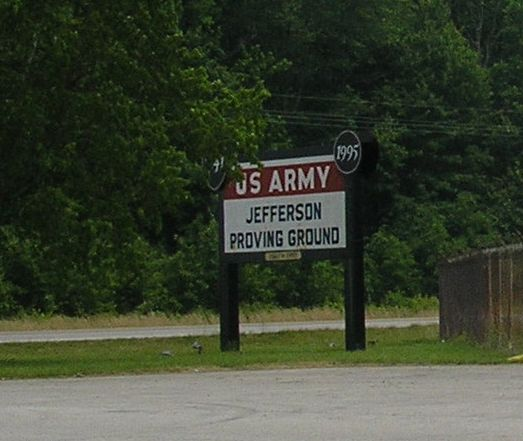
Sign at the entrance from US 421

The Jefferson Proving Ground (or JPG), located near Madison, Indiana, is a former munitions testing facility of Test and Evaluation Command of the United States Army Materiel Development and Readiness Command. The grounds of JPG serve as a wildlife refuge, as well as a gunnery range. Department of Defense organizations and private contractors are assigned to the area.

== History ==
On October 8, 1940, the Chief of Ordnance acknowledged a need for the construction of an additional proving ground to carry out simultaneously and without interruption the many activities relative to proof work of the ordnance manufacturing program. In December 1940, the site acquisition committee decided on a 56,000-acre (230 km^{2}) tract of land in Ripley, Jefferson, and Jennings counties in southern Indiana. The site was selected for its proximity to a powder manufacturing plant at Charlestown, Indiana, an ordinance plant at LaPorte County, Indiana, and an ammunition storage depot in Martin County, Indiana, as well as military installations at Fort Benjamin Harrison in Indianapolis, Fort Hayes in Ohio, and Forts Thomas and Knox in Kentucky. Residents living within the area of planned site were given 30 to 120 days to vacate the land. Construction began immediately, and the first round was fired at U.S. Army JPG on May 10, 1941. In April 1953, JPG reached a pinnacle of employment and activity, with 1,774 employees and a production of 175,000 rounds fired monthly.

Collin's Ford Bridge, Marble Creek Bridge, Oakdale School, also known as Building 401, and Old Timbers are listed on the National Register of Historic Places.

== Base closure and further use ==
In 1989, JPG was identified for base closure under the base realignment and closure (BRAC) and closed on September 30, 1995. Since that time, the U.S. Army has maintained a small on-site oversight staff and an off-site environmental coordinator. JPG is currently administered by the BRAC Division within the U.S. Army's Installation Management Agency which is responsible for managing JPG's closure, cleanup, and property transfer.

Approximately 50,000 acres (200 km^{2}) of the grounds north of the historic firing line was leased to the United States Fish and Wildlife Service in 2000 to be operated as Big Oaks National Wildlife Refuge. In 1998, a 1,033-acre (4.18 km^{2}) parcel of land north of the firing line within the former range is operated as an air-to-surface gunnery/bombing range by the Indiana Air National Guard. As of 2014, Jefferson Range is used for UAV training, including tests of air-to-ground strikes.

Railroad tracks on the site are used for car storage by the Madison Railroad.

== Environmental concerns ==
The base contains a substantial amount of depleted uranium and the NRC has posed questions to the Army regarding environmental concerns as a result.
