= Delaware Township, Indiana =

Delaware Township is the name of three townships in the U.S. state of Indiana:

- Delaware Township, Delaware County, Indiana
- Delaware Township, Hamilton County, Indiana
- Delaware Township, Ripley County, Indiana
