= Clinton, Ripley County, Indiana =

Clinton
- Unincorporated community
- Location within Indiana Location within the United States
- Coordinates: 39°12′38″N 85°07′55″W
- Country: United States
- State: Indiana
- County: Ripley
- Township: Franklin
- Established: 1833
- Elevation: 991 ft (302 m)
- Time zone: UTC-5 (Eastern (EST))
  - Summer (DST): UTC-4 (EDT)
- ZIP code: 47041
- Area codes: 812, 930
- GNIS feature ID: 432670

Clinton is an unincorporated community in Franklin Township, Ripley County, in the U.S. state of Indiana.

== History ==
Clinton was founded in 1833.
