= Oakdale School (Madison, Indiana) =

- U.S. National Register of Historic Places
- Location within Indiana Location within the United States
- Location: Morgan Rd., Jefferson Proving Ground, Monroe Township, Jefferson County, Indiana
- Coordinates: 38°50′24″N 85°25′33″W
- Area: less than one acre
- Built: 1869
- Architectural style: Gable-front
- NRHP reference No.: 93000432
- Added to NRHP: May 14, 1993

Oakdale School, also known as Building 401, is a historic one-room school building located within Big Oaks National Wildlife Refuge (formerly Jefferson Proving Ground) in Monroe Township, Jefferson County, Indiana. It was built in 1869, and is a one-story, rectangular limestone building. It measures 24 feet wide and 30 feet deep, and has a front gable roof.

It was listed on the National Register of Historic Places in 1993.
