= Johnson Township, Ripley County, Indiana =

Johnson Township
- Township
- Coordinates: 39°03′32″N 85°14′59″W
- Country: United States
- State: Indiana
- County: Ripley

Government
  - Type: Indiana township

Area
  - Total: 54.98 sq mi (142.4 km^{2})
  - Land: 54.62 sq mi (141.5 km^{2})
  - Water: 0.35 sq mi (0.91 km^{2})
- Elevation: 955 ft (291 m)

Population (2020)
  - Total: 3,763
  - Density: 68.89/sq mi (26.60/km^{2})
- Area code: 812
- FIPS code: 18-38754
- GNIS feature ID: 453516

Johnson Township is one of eleven townships in Ripley County, Indiana. As of the 2020 census, its population was 3,763 (up from 3,685 at 2010) and it contained 1,710 housing units.

Historical population
Census	Pop.	Note	%±
1890	2,041		—
1900	2,232		9.4%
1910	2,066		−7.4%
1920	1,897		−8.2%
1930	1,747		−7.9%
1940	1,875		7.3%
1950	2,169		15.7%
1960	2,296		5.9%
1970	2,266		−1.3%
1980	2,960		30.6%
1990	3,190		7.8%
2000	3,399		6.6%
2010	3,685		8.4%
2020	3,763		2.1%
Source: US Decennial Census

== Geography ==
According to the 2010 census, the township has a total area of 54.98 square miles (142.4 km^{2}), of which 54.62 square miles (141.5 km^{2}) (or 99.35%) is land and 0.35 square miles (0.91 km^{2}) (or 0.64%) is water.

=== Cities and towns ===
- Versailles

=== Unincorporated towns ===
- Correct
