= Pierceville, Indiana =

- Unincorporated community and Census-designated place
- Location within Indiana Location within the United States
- Coordinates: 39°07′59″N 85°10′43″W
- Country: United States
- State: Indiana
- County: Ripley
- Township: Franklin
- Platted: 1860
- Elevation: 1,011 ft (308 m)
- Time zone: UTC-5 (Eastern (EST))
  - Summer (DST): UTC-4 (EDT)
- ZIP code: 47031
- Area codes: 812, 930
- FIPS code: 18-59616
- GNIS feature ID: 2830517

Pierceville is an unincorporated community in Franklin Township, Ripley County, in the U.S. state of Indiana.

== History ==
Pierceville was laid out in 1860. The community's name recognizes the Pierce family of settlers. A post office was established at Pierceville in 1854, and has since remained in operation. Pierceville also has a United Methodist Church.

== Demographics ==
The United States Census Bureau defined Pierceville as a census designated place in the 2022 American Community Survey.
