= Delaware, Indiana =

- Unincorporated community and Census-designated place
- Location within Indiana Location within the United States
- Coordinates: 39°08′44″N 85°12′22″W
- Country: United States
- State: Indiana
- County: Ripley
- Township: Delaware
- Platted: 16 May 1870
- Elevation: 938 ft (286 m)
- Time zone: UTC-5 (Eastern)
  - Summer (DST): UTC-4 (Eastern)
- ZIP code: 47037
- Area codes: 812, 930
- FIPS code: 18-17506
- GNIS feature ID: 2830512

Delaware is an unincorporated community in Delaware Township, Ripley County, in the U.S. state of Indiana.

== History ==
Delaware was platted in 1870. An old variant name of the community was called Rei.

A post office was established at Delaware in 1838, and operated until 1933.

== Demographics ==
The United States Census Bureau first delineated Delaware as a census designated place in the 2022 American Community Survey.
