= Straber Ford Bridge =

- U.S. National Register of Historic Places
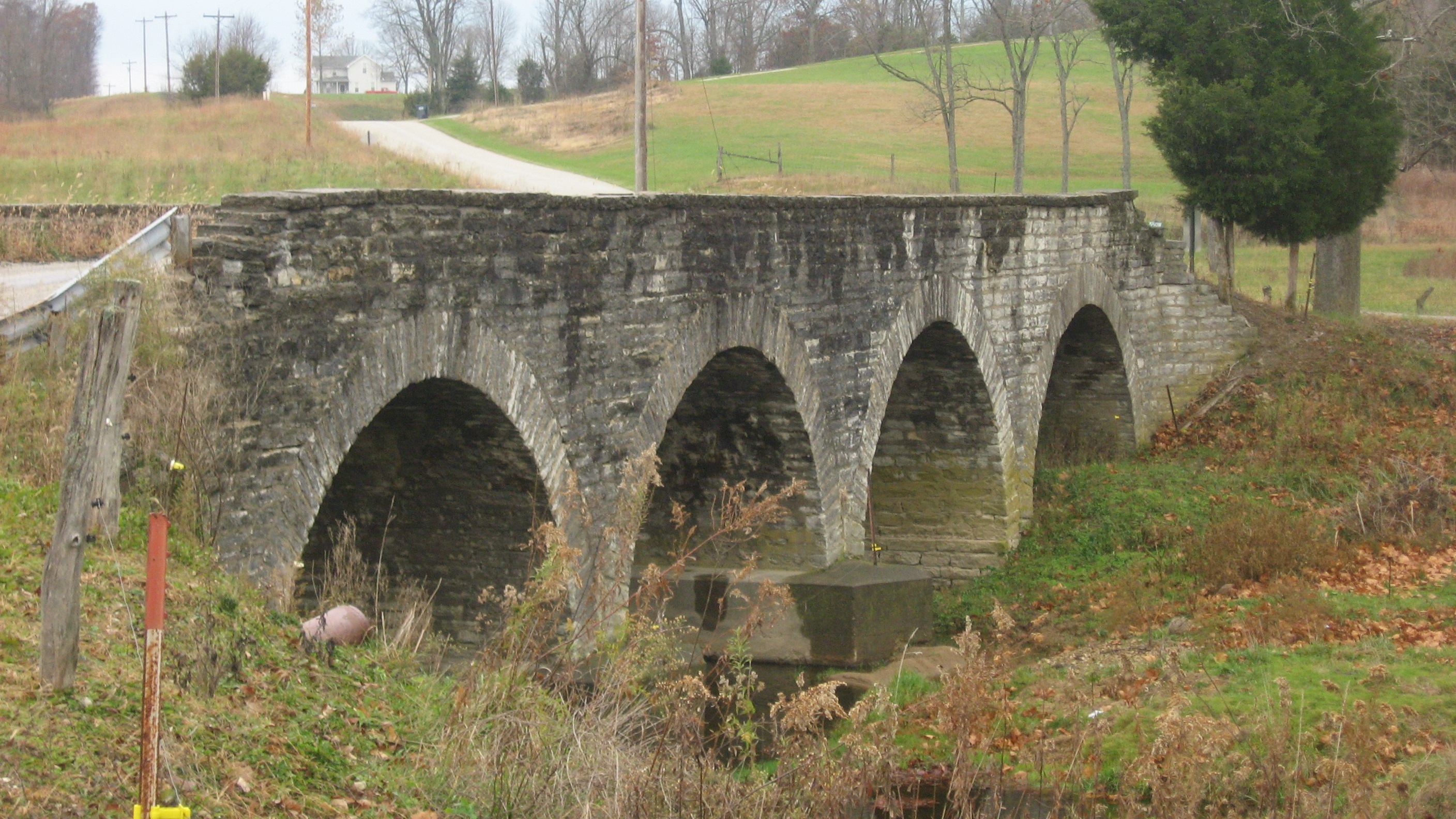
- Straber Ford Bridge, November 2012

- Location within Indiana Location within the United States
- Location: County Road 500N over Otter Creek, northwest of Osgood in Center Township, Ripley County, Indiana
- Coordinates: 39°8′53″N 85°21′45″W
- Area: less than one acre
- Built: 1908
- Built by: Degolyer and Stegner
- Architectural style: stone arch bridge
- NRHP reference No.: 09001132
- Added to NRHP: December 24, 2009

Straber Ford Bridge, also known as Ripley County Bridge #173, is a historic stone arch bridge located in Center Township, Ripley County, Indiana, United States. It was built in 1908, and is a four-span, semicircular-arch bridge constructed of limestone. It measures 105 feet, 8 inches, long and is 20 feet wide.

It was added to the National Register of Historic Places in 2009.
