= Ballstown, Indiana =

- Unincorporated community
- Location within Indiana Location within the United States
- Coordinates: 39°15′02″N 85°14′39″W
- Country: United States
- State: Indiana
- County: Ripley
- Township: Laughery
- Elevation: 902 ft (275 m)
- Time zone: UTC-5 (Eastern (EST))
  - Summer (DST): UTC-4 (EDT)
- ZIP code: 47006
- Area codes: 812, 930
- GNIS feature ID: 430466

Ballstown is an unincorporated community in Laughery Township, Ripley County, in the U.S. state of Indiana.

== History ==
Ballstown was platted in 1848 by Samuel Ball, and named after him. A post office was established at Ballstown in 1844, and remained in operation until 1904.
