= Elrod, Indiana =

- Unincorporated community and Census-designated place
- Location within Indiana Location within the United States
- Coordinates: 39°03′21″N 85°09′47″W
- Country: United States
- State: Indiana
- County: Ripley
- Township: Washington
- Elevation: 968 ft (295 m)
- Time zone: UTC-5 (Eastern (EST))
  - Summer (DST): UTC-4 (EDT)
- ZIP code: 47031
- Area codes: 812, 930
- GNIS feature ID: 2830513

Elrod is an unincorporated community in Washington Township, Ripley County, in the U.S. state of Indiana.

== History ==
A post office was established at Elrod in 1849, and remained in operation until 1903. George W. Elrod, an early postmaster, gave the community his name.

== Demographics ==
The United States Census Bureau first delineated Elrod as a census designated place in the 2022 American Community Survey.
