= Milan Masonic Lodge No. 31 =

- U.S. National Register of Historic Places
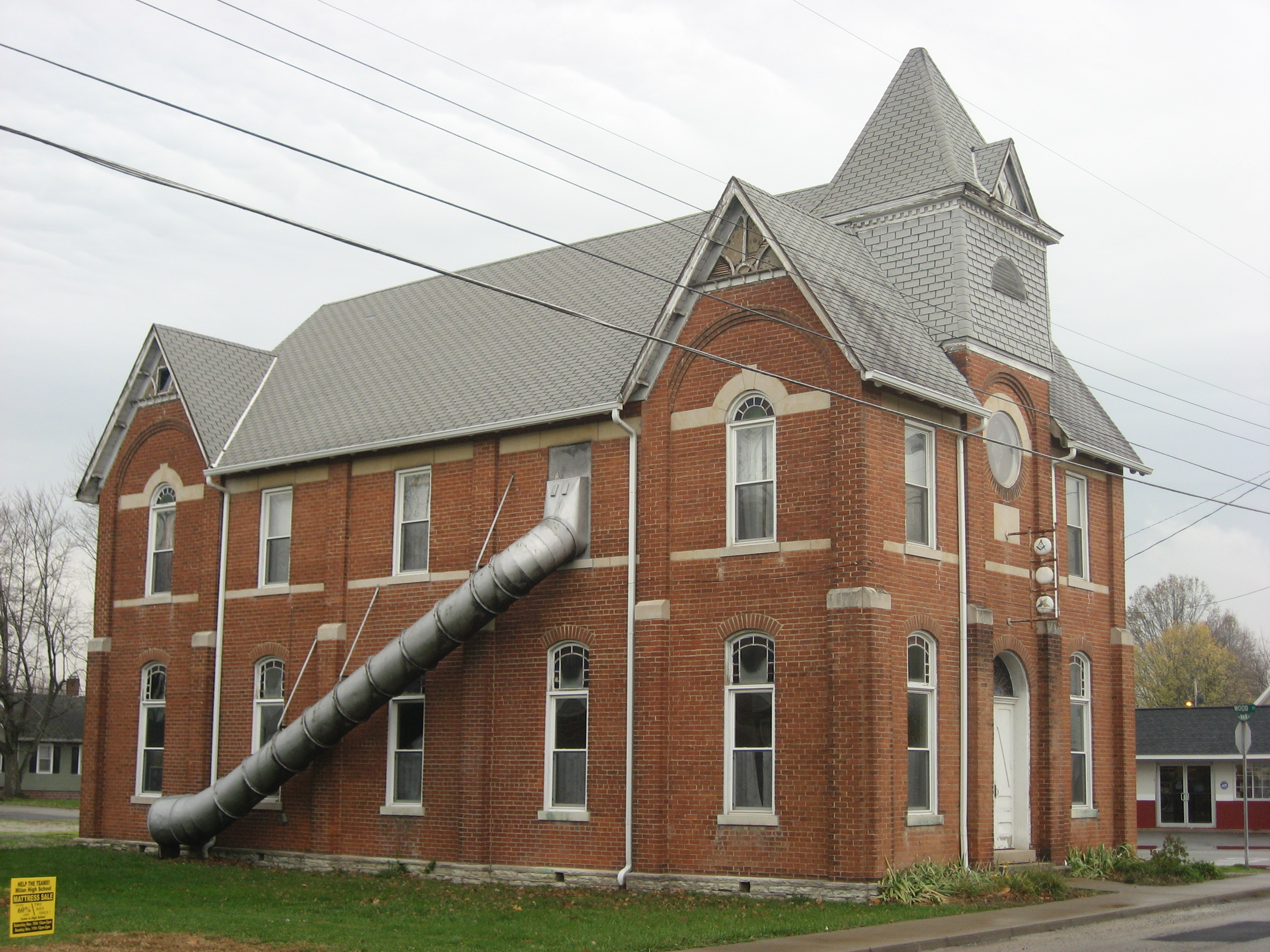
- Milan Masonic Lodge No. 31, November 2012

- Location within Indiana Location within the United States
- Location: 312 Main St., Milan, Indiana
- Coordinates: 39°07′30″N 85°07′54″W
- Area: less than one acre
- Built: 1900
- Architect: Griffith, H.C.
- Architectural style: Romanesque Revival, Queen Anne
- NRHP reference No.: 12001155
- Added to NRHP: January 9, 2013

Milan Masonic Lodge No. 31 is a historic Masonic lodge located at Milan, Indiana. It was built in 1900, and is a two-story, brick building with modest Romanesque Revival and Queen Anne style design elements. It features elliptical and round-arched openings, a steeply pitched gable roof, pyramidal tower, stained glass windows, and wood detailing in the gable ends. It is the oldest continuously active Masonic Lodges in Ripley County.

It was added to the National Register of Historic Places in 2013.

== See also ==
- List of Masonic buildings in Indiana
- National Register of Historic Places listings in Ripley County, Indiana
