= Lookout, Indiana =

- Unincorporated community
- Location within Indiana Location within the United States
- Coordinates: 39°11′43″N 85°12′27″W
- Country: United States
- State: Indiana
- County: Ripley
- Township: Delaware
- Elevation: 971 ft (296 m)
- Time zone: UTC-5 (Eastern (EST))
  - Summer (DST): UTC-4 (EDT)
- ZIP code: 47006
- Area codes: 812, 930
- GNIS feature ID: 438298

Lookout is an unincorporated community in Delaware Township, Ripley County, in the U.S. state of Indiana.

== History ==
A post office was established at Lookout in 1889, and remained in operation until it was discontinued in 1906.
