= Washington Township, Ripley County, Indiana =

Washington Township
- Township
- Coordinates: 39°04′14″N 85°08′29″W
- Country: United States
- State: Indiana
- County: Ripley

Government
  - Type: Indiana township

Area
  - Total: 29.33 sq mi (76.0 km^{2})
  - Land: 29.31 sq mi (75.9 km^{2})
  - Water: 0.02 sq mi (0.052 km^{2})
- Elevation: 945 ft (288 m)

Population (2020)
  - Total: 2,257
  - Density: 77.00/sq mi (29.73/km^{2})
- Area code: 812
- FIPS code: 18-81008
- GNIS feature ID: 454017

Washington Township is one of eleven townships in Ripley County, Indiana. As of the 2020 census, its population was 2,257 (down from 2,440 at 2010) and it contained 895 housing units.

Historical population
Census	Pop.	Note	%±
1890	925		—
1900	871		−5.8%
1910	856		−1.7%
1920	885		3.4%
1930	874		−1.2%
1940	910		4.1%
1950	1,067		17.3%
1960	1,268		18.8%
1970	1,301		2.6%
1980	1,811		39.2%
1990	1,989		9.8%
2000	2,196		10.4%
2010	2,440		11.1%
2020	2,257		−7.5%
Source: US Decennial Census

== Geography ==
According to the 2010 census, the township has a total area of 29.33 square miles (76.0 km^{2}), of which 29.31 square miles (75.9 km^{2}) (or 99.93%) is land and 0.02 square miles (0.052 km^{2}) (or 0.07%) is water.

=== Cities and towns ===
- Milan (southern half)

=== Unincorporated towns ===
- Elrod
- Stringtown

== Education ==
Washington Township residents may obtain a free library card from the Osgood Public Library Central Library in Osgood, or its branch in Milan.
