= Franklin Township, Ripley County, Indiana =

Franklin Township
- Township
- Coordinates: 39°10′13″N 85°08′29″W
- Country: United States
- State: Indiana
- County: Ripley

Government
  - Type: Indiana township

Area
  - Total: 36.6 sq mi (95 km^{2})
  - Land: 36.54 sq mi (94.6 km^{2})
  - Water: 0.06 sq mi (0.16 km^{2})
- Elevation: 994 ft (303 m)

Population (2020)
  - Total: 3,628
  - Density: 99.29/sq mi (38.34/km^{2})
- Area code: 812
- FIPS code: 18-25612
- GNIS feature ID: 453314
- Website: www.in.gov/townships/franklin69/

Franklin Township is one of eleven townships in Ripley County, Indiana. As of the 2020 census, its population was 3,628 (down from 3,773 at 2010) and it contained 1,574 housing units.

Historical population
Census	Pop.	Note	%±
1890	1,755		—
1900	1,929		9.9%
1910	1,722		−10.7%
1920	1,872		8.7%
1930	1,949		4.1%
1940	2,108		8.2%
1950	2,315		9.8%
1960	2,784		20.3%
1970	2,907		4.4%
1980	3,434		18.1%
1990	3,053		−11.1%
2000	3,362		10.1%
2010	3,773		12.2%
2020	3,628		−3.8%
Source: US Decennial Census

== Geography ==
According to the 2010 census, the township has a total area of 36.6 square miles (95 km^{2}), of which 36.54 square miles (94.6 km^{2}) (or 99.84%) is land and 0.06 square miles (0.16 km^{2}) (or 0.16%) is water.

=== Cities and towns ===
- Milan (northern half)

=== Unincorporated towns ===
- Behlmer Corner
- Clinton
- Negengards Corner
- Old Milan
- Pierceville

== Education ==
Franklin Township residents may obtain a free library card from the Osgood Public Library Central Library in Osgood, or its branch in Milan.
