= Shelby Township, Ripley County, Indiana =

Shelby Township
- Township
- Coordinates: 38°58′19″N 85°22′34″W
- Country: United States
- State: Indiana
- County: Ripley

Government
  - Type: Indiana township

Area
  - Total: 69.39 sq mi (179.7 km^{2})
  - Land: 69.11 sq mi (179.0 km^{2})
  - Water: 0.27 sq mi (0.70 km^{2})
- Elevation: 912 ft (278 m)

Population (2020)
  - Total: 1,038
  - Density: 15.02/sq mi (5.799/km^{2})
- Area code: 812
- FIPS code: 18-69264
- GNIS feature ID: 453845

Shelby Township is one of eleven townships in Ripley County, Indiana. As of the 2020 census, its population was 1,038 (up from 999 at 2010) and it contained 373 housing units.

Historical population
Census	Pop.	Note	%±
1890	2,365		—
1900	2,387		0.9%
1910	2,182		−8.6%
1920	1,995		−8.6%
1930	1,569		−21.4%
1940	1,665		6.1%
1950	801		−51.9%
1960	881		10.0%
1970	830		−5.8%
1980	901		8.6%
1990	853		−5.3%
2000	867		1.6%
2010	999		15.2%
2020	1,038		3.9%
Source: US Decennial Census

== History ==
Collin's Ford Bridge, Marble Creek Bridge, and Old Timbers in the Big Oaks National Wildlife Refuge are listed on the National Register of Historic Places.

== Geography ==
According to the 2010 census, the township has a total area of 69.39 square miles (179.7 km^{2}), of which 69.11 square miles (179.0 km^{2}) (or 99.60%) is land and 0.27 square miles (0.70 km^{2}) (or 0.39%) is water.

=== Unincorporated towns ===
- New Marion
- Rexville

=== Extinct town ===
- Saint Magdalen
