= Stringtown, Ripley County, Indiana =

Stringtown
- Unincorporated community
- Location within Indiana Location within the United States
- Coordinates: 39°05′54″N 85°09′48″W
- Country: United States
- State: Indiana
- County: Ripley
- Township: Washington
- Elevation: 981 ft (299 m)
- Time zone: UTC-5 (Eastern (EST))
  - Summer (DST): UTC-4 (EDT)
- ZIP code: 47031
- Area codes: 812, 930
- GNIS feature ID: 444268

Stringtown is an unincorporated community in Washington Township, Ripley County, in the U.S. state of Indiana. It is one of seven communities named Stringtown in the state.

== History ==
A post office was established at Stringtown in 1848, and remained in operation until it was discontinued in 1865.
