= Negangards Corner, Indiana =

- Unincorporated community
- Location within Indiana Location within the United States
- Coordinates: 39°11′28″N 85°05′41″W
- Country: United States
- State: Indiana
- County: Ripley
- Township: Franklin
- Elevation: 1,004 ft (306 m)
- Time zone: UTC-5 (Eastern (EST))
  - Summer (DST): UTC-4 (EDT)
- ZIP code: 47031
- Area codes: 812, 930
- GNIS feature ID: 439984

Negangards Corner is an unincorporated community in Franklin Township, Ripley County, in the U.S. state of Indiana.

== History ==
Negangards Corner had its start when a general store opened at the town site. An old variant name of the community was called North Hogan.

A post office opened under the name North Hogan in 1844, and remained in operation until it was discontinued in 1877.
