= Collin's Ford Bridge =

- U.S. National Register of Historic Places
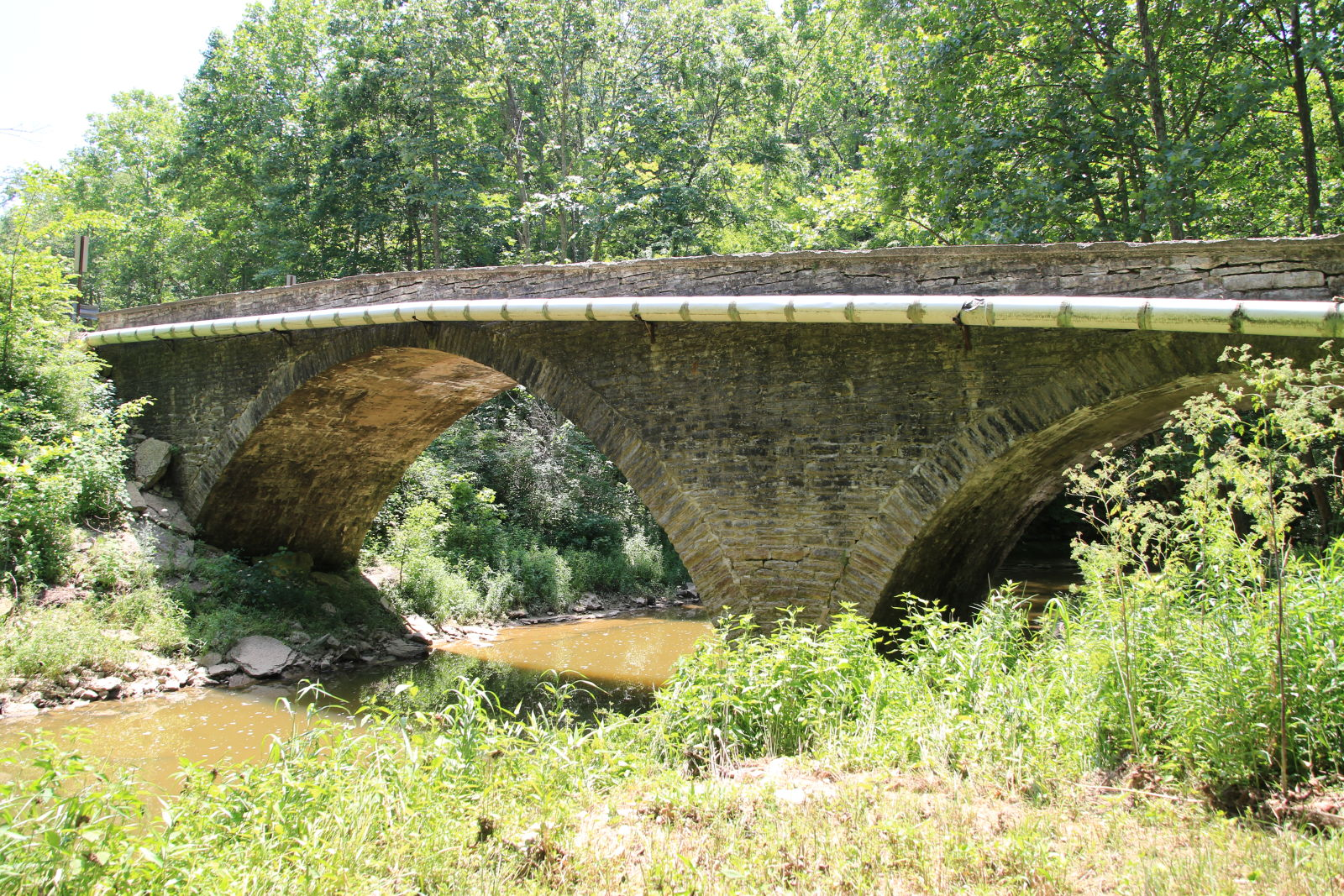

- Location within Indiana Location within the United States
- Location: US Army Jefferson Proving Ground, approximately 0.75 miles west of New Marion in Shelby Township, Ripley County, Indiana
- Coordinates: 39°0′29″N 85°22′14″W
- Area: less than one acre
- Built: c. 1907
- Built by: Wright, James E.; Rogers, John
- Architectural style: stone-arched bridge
- NRHP reference No.: 96000787
- Added to NRHP: July 30, 1996

Collin's Ford Bridge, also known as Bridge #28, is a historic stone arch bridge located within Big Oaks National Wildlife Refuge (formerly Jefferson Proving Ground) in Shelby Township, Ripley County, Indiana. It was built about 1907, and is a two-span, round-arch bridge constructed of limestone. It measures 108 feet long and is 17 feet wide. The property was acquired by the U.S. Army in 1941.

It was added to the National Register of Historic Places in 1996.
