= Cross Roads, Ripley County, Indiana =

Cross Roads
- Unincorporated community
- Location within Indiana Location within the United States
- Coordinates: 39°16′46″N 85°14′30″W
- Country: United States
- State: Indiana
- County: Ripley
- Township: Laughery
- Elevation: 958 ft (292 m)
- Time zone: UTC-5 (Eastern (EST))
  - Summer (DST): UTC-4 (EDT)
- ZIP code: 47006
- Area codes: 812, 930
- GNIS feature ID: 433187

Cross Roads is an unincorporated community in Laughery Township, Ripley County, in the U.S. state of Indiana.

== History ==
The community was so named for the fact it originally contained a store at a crossroads. An old variant name of the community was called Spanglerville.
