= Amos W. Jackson =

American judge

Indiana Supreme Court
- In office December 2, 1958 – 1970

Personal details
- Born: June 25, 1904 Versailles, Indiana, U.S.
- Died: September 30, 1972 (aged 68) Madison, Indiana, U.S.
- Resting place: Cliff Hill Cemetery, Versailles, Indiana, U.S.
- Party: Democratic
- Spouse: Lola Raper Jackson 1927–
- Parent(s): Rowland H. Jackson & Georgia W. Frohlinger Jackson
- Education: Hanover College
- Occupation: Attorney
- Awards: Sagamore of the Wabash 1961; Kentucky Colonel 1969
- He's buried at Cliff Hill Cemetery.

Amos Wade Jackson (June 25, 1904 – September 30, 1972) was an American judge. He was a judge on the Indiana Supreme Court from 1958 until 1970. He was awarded the Sagamore of the Wabash in 1961 and was named a Kentucky Colonel in 1969.

== Early life and education ==
Amos Wade Jackson was born on June 25, 1904, in Versailles, Indiana. His father was attorney and businessman Rowland H. Jackson and his mother, Georgia W. Frohlinger Jackson. He attended Hanover College to study law. Jackson was a member of Theta Kappa Nu starting in October 1924. He was accepted to the Indiana State Bar Association in 1925. He graduated from Hanover in June 1926.

== Career ==
In 1930, Jackson joined his father's law firm, forming Jackson & Jackson. He also became president of Jackson Abstracts, which is father co-owned. From 1937 until 1940, Jackson was chief prosecutor for Ripley County.

In the 1940s, he served as president of the Bank of Versailles. Jackson served as an associate attorney for the United States Department of War from 1942 until 1943. While at the Department of War, he represented the Army Corps of Engineers during World War II. After, he returned to Versailles to private practice. Jackson successfully ran for the Indiana Supreme Court in 1958. In 1961, he became a member of Phi Alpha Delta and he was awarded the Sagamore of the Wabash. Jackson was named a Kentucky Colonel in 1969. He retired in 1970 from the Indiana Supreme Court due to health issues.

== Personal life ==
Jackson married Lola Raper Jackson on August 20, 1927. They had two children, daughters.

The Jackson's owned Merritt Island, Florida. They eventually sold the island to NASA for Cape Canaveral. Jackson was a freemason.

Jackson died at King's Daughters Hospital in Madison, Indiana on September 30, 1972. His funeral was held at Versailles Baptist Church.

== Legacy ==
Jackson's archives are held in the collection of the Indiana State Library.

Political offices
Preceded by James Emmert	Justice of the Indiana Supreme Court; 1951–1955	Succeeded by Dixon Prentice
