= Old Milan, Indiana =

- Unincorporated community
- Location within Indiana Location within the United States
- Coordinates: 39°08′47″N 85°07′57″W
- Country: United States
- State: Indiana
- County: Ripley
- Township: Franklin
- Elevation: 971 ft (296 m)
- Time zone: UTC-5 (Eastern (EST))
  - Summer (DST): UTC-4 (EDT)
- ZIP code: 47031
- Area codes: 812, 930
- FIPS code: 18-56322
- GNIS feature ID: 440578

Old Milan (/ˈmaɪlən/ MY-lən) is an unincorporated community in Franklin Township, Ripley County, in the U.S. state of Indiana.

== History ==
Old Milan was originally called Milan, and under the latter name was founded in 1836. Construction of the railroad bypassed Old Milan, and most of the town moved to "new" Milan in 1854.
