= Dewberry, Indiana =

- Unincorporated community
- Location within Indiana Location within the United States
- Coordinates: 38°57′04″N 85°09′06″W
- Country: United States
- State: Indiana
- County: Ripley
- Township: Brown
- Elevation: 915 ft (279 m)
- Time zone: UTC-5 (Eastern (EST))
  - Summer (DST): UTC-4 (EDT)
- ZIP code: 47017
- Area codes: 812, 930
- GNIS feature ID: 433519

Dewberry is an unincorporated community in Brown Township, Ripley County, in the U.S. state of Indiana.

== History ==
A post office was established at Dewberry in 1882, and remained in operation until it was discontinued in 1887.
