= Otter Village, Indiana =

- Unincorporated community
- Location within Indiana Location within the United States
- Coordinates: 39°07′07″N 85°19′53″W
- Country: United States
- State: Indiana
- County: Ripley
- Township: Center
- Elevation: 958 ft (292 m)
- Time zone: UTC-5 (Eastern (EST))
  - Summer (DST): UTC-4 (EDT)
- ZIP code: 47037
- Area codes: 812, 930
- GNIS feature ID: 440749

Otter Village is an unincorporated community in Center Township, Ripley County, in the U.S. state of Indiana.

== History ==
Otter Village was laid out in 1837. The community took its name from Otter Creek. A post office was established at Otter Village in 1838, and remained in operation until it was discontinued in 1858.
