= Laughery Township, Ripley County, Indiana =

Laughery Township
- Township
- Coordinates: 39°15′07″N 85°15′14″W
- Country: United States
- State: Indiana
- County: Ripley

Government
  - Type: Indiana township

Area
  - Total: 25.97 sq mi (67.3 km^{2})
  - Land: 25.85 sq mi (67.0 km^{2})
  - Water: 0.12 sq mi (0.31 km^{2})
- Elevation: 906 ft (276 m)

Population (2020)
  - Total: 5,090
  - Density: 197/sq mi (76.0/km^{2})
- Area code: 812
- FIPS code: 18-42336
- GNIS feature ID: 453542

Laughery Township is one of eleven townships in Ripley County, Indiana. As of the 2020 census, its population was 5,090 (up from 4,736 at 2010) and it contained 2,108 housing units.

Laughery Township took its name from Laughery Creek.

Historical population
Census	Pop.	Note	%±
1890	2,101		—
1900	2,459		17.0%
1910	2,883		17.2%
1920	3,082		6.9%
1930	3,464		12.4%
1940	3,754		8.4%
1950	3,902		3.9%
1960	4,148		6.3%
1970	4,231		2.0%
1980	4,357		3.0%
1990	4,441		1.9%
2000	4,581		3.2%
2010	4,736		3.4%
2020	5,090		7.5%
Source: US Decennial Census

== Geography ==
According to the 2010 census, the township has a total area of 25.97 square miles (67.3 km^{2}), of which 25.85 square miles (67.0 km^{2}) (or 99.54%) is land and 0.12 square miles (0.31 km^{2}) (or 0.46%) is water.

=== Cities and towns ===
- Batesville (partial)

=== Unincorporated towns ===
- Ballstown
- Cross Roads
