= Old Timbers =

Historic house in Indiana, United States

- U.S. National Register of Historic Places
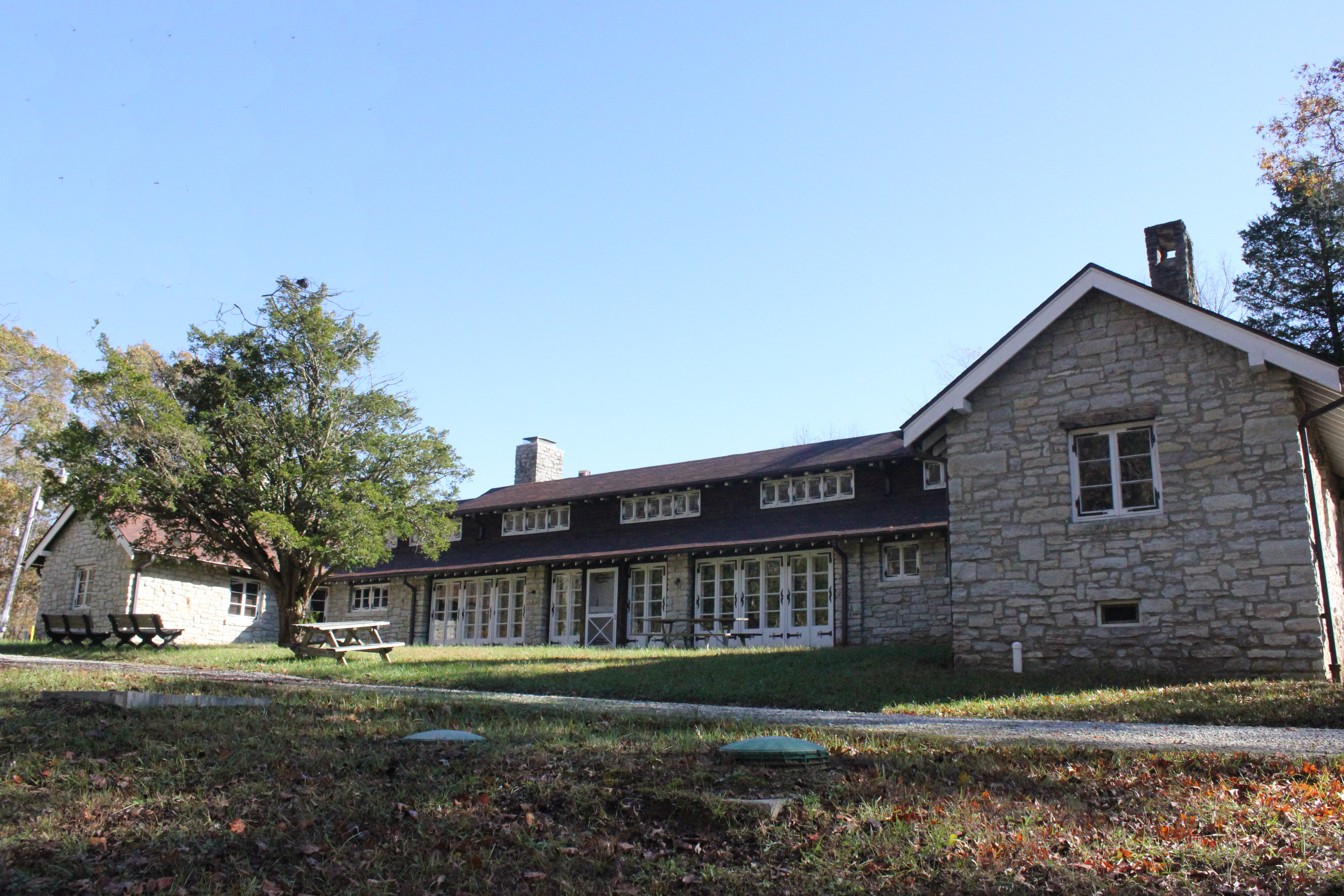

- Location within Indiana Location within the United States
- Location: US Army Jefferson Proving Ground, approximately 0.5 miles southeast of the junction of K Rd. and Northeast Exit, Shelby Township, Ripley County, Indiana
- Coordinates: 39°0′17″N 85°23′26″W
- Area: less than one acre
- Built: 1932
- Architect: Alfred O. Elzner
- Architectural style: Bungalow/craftsman
- NRHP reference No.: 96000786
- Added to NRHP: July 30, 1996

Old Timbers is a historic home located within Big Oaks National Wildlife Refuge (formerly Jefferson Proving Ground) in Shelby Township, Ripley County, Indiana. It was built in 1932, and is a 1 1/2-story, Bungalow / American Craftsman style stone building. It has a jerkinhead roof and kitchen wing. It was originally built as a lodge for Alexander Thompson, owner of the Champion Paper Company of Hamilton, Ohio. The property was acquired by the U.S. Army in 1940.

It was added to the National Register of Historic Places in 1996.
