= Fernando G. Taylor House =

Historic house in Indiana, United States

- U.S. National Register of Historic Places
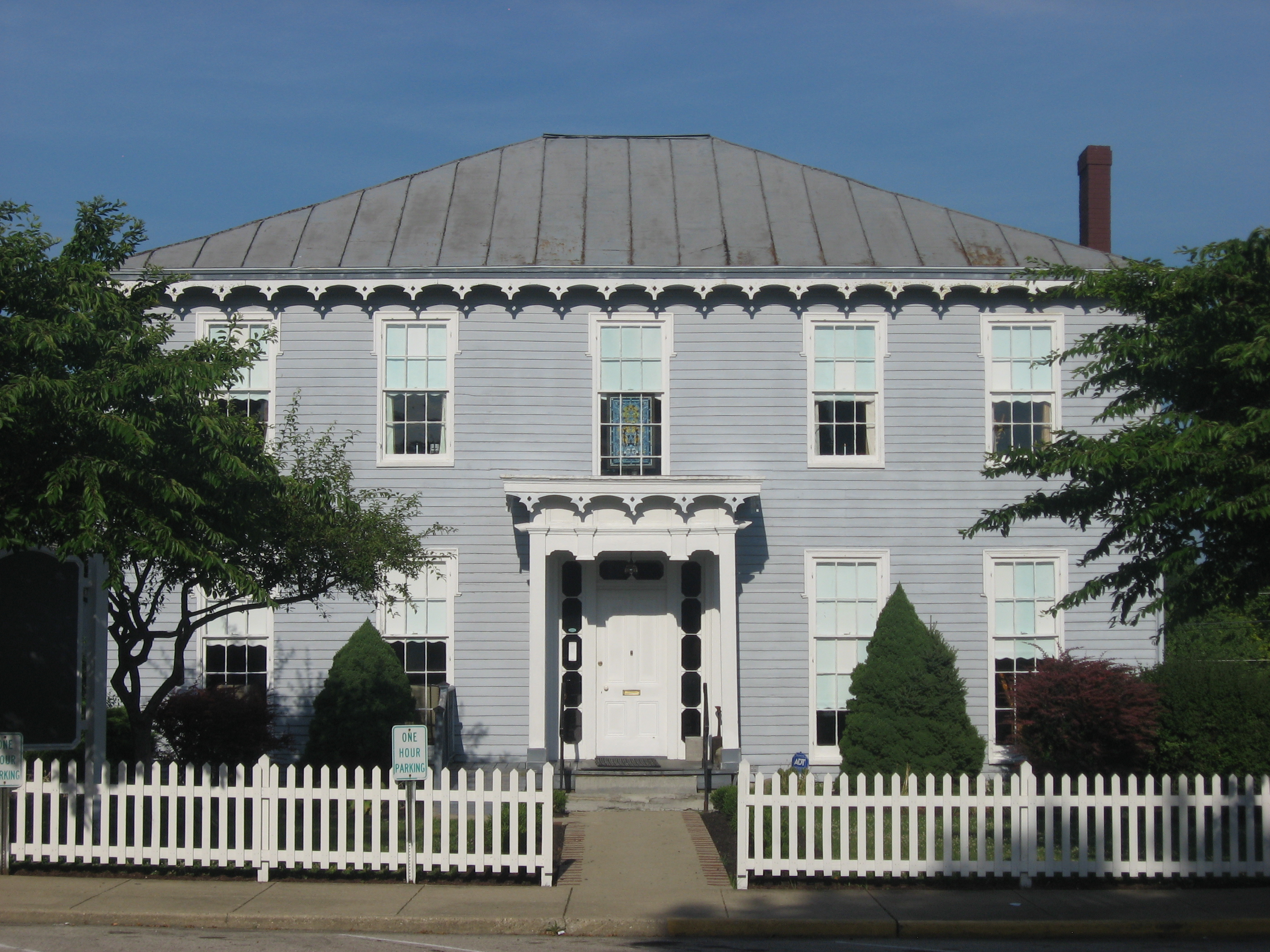
- Fernando G. Taylor House, June 2012

- Location within Indiana Location within the United States
- Location: NE corner of Main and Tyson Sts., Versailles, Indiana
- Coordinates: 39°4′17″N 85°15′3″W
- Area: less than one acre
- Built: c. 1860
- Architectural style: Gothic Revival
- NRHP reference No.: 86002710
- Added to NRHP: September 22, 1986

Fernando G. Taylor House, also known as the Taylor-Kaiser-Smith House, is a historic home in Versailles, Indiana. It was built about 1860, and is a two-story, rectangular, five bay, vernacular frame dwelling with Gothic Revival style influences. It measures 44 feet wide and 36 feet deep. The house rests on a poured concrete foundation and has a hipped roof. It was moved to its present location in 1983.

It was added to the National Register of Historic Places in 1986.
