= Center Township, Ripley County, Indiana =

Center Township
- Township
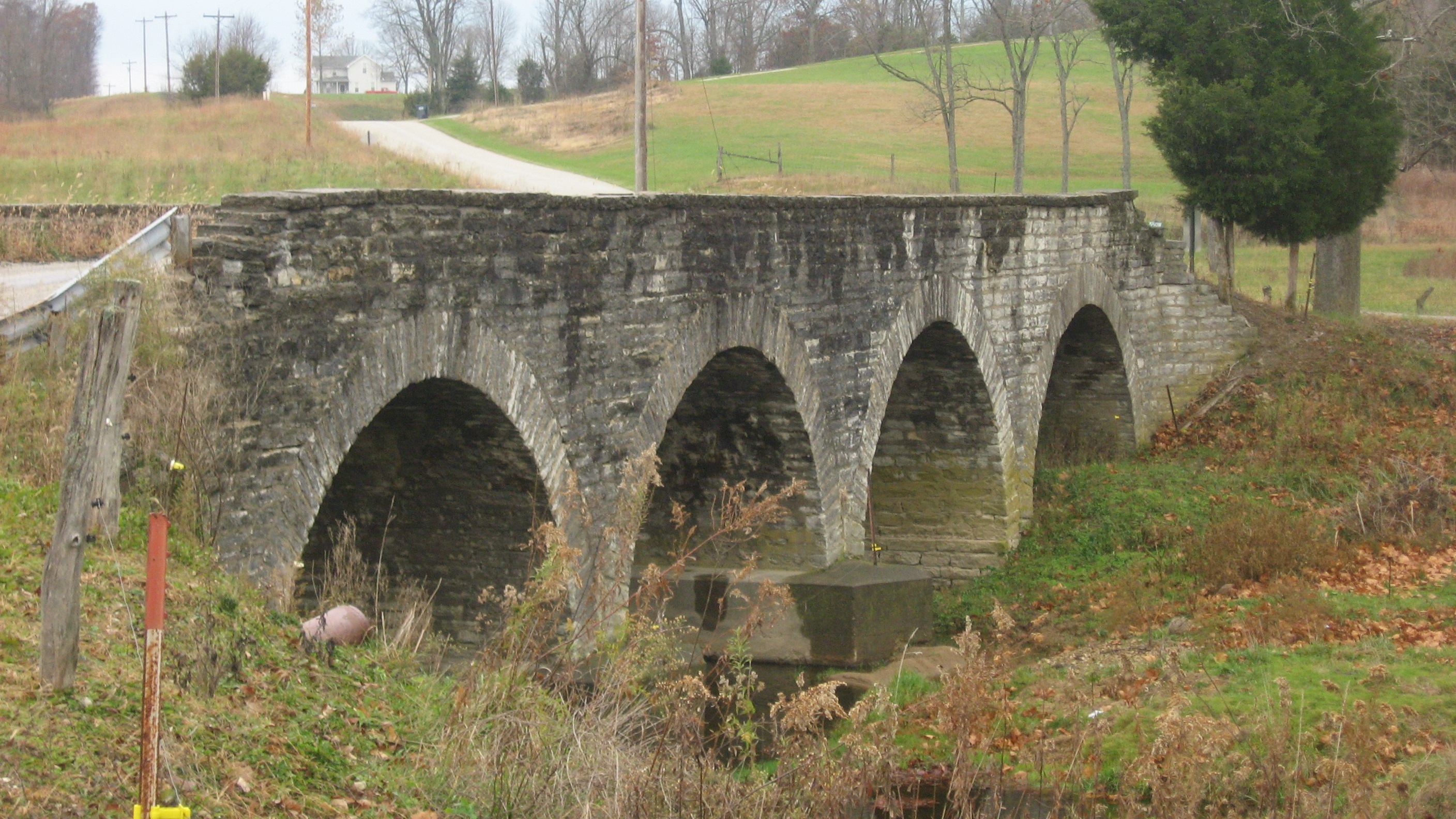
- The Straber Ford Bridge, a local landmark

- Coordinates: 39°08′16″N 85°18′16″W
- Country: United States
- State: Indiana
- County: Ripley

Government
  - Type: Indiana township

Area
  - Total: 29.51 sq mi (76.4 km^{2})
  - Land: 29.43 sq mi (76.2 km^{2})
  - Water: 0.08 sq mi (0.21 km^{2})
- Elevation: 981 ft (299 m)

Population (2020)
  - Total: 2,568
  - Density: 87.26/sq mi (33.69/km^{2})
- Area code: 812
- FIPS code: 18-11602
- GNIS feature ID: 453191

Center Township is one of eleven townships in Ripley County, Indiana. As of the 2020 census, its population was 2,568 (down from 2,657 at 2010) and it contained 1,142 housing units.

Historical population
| Census | Pop. | Note | %± |
|---|---|---|---|
| 1890 | 1,948 | | — |
| 1900 | 2,030 | | 4.2% |
| 1910 | 2,024 | | −0.3% |
| 1920 | 1,813 | | −10.4% |
| 1930 | 1,928 | | 6.3% |
| 1940 | 1,944 | | 0.8% |
| 1950 | 1,966 | | 1.1% |
| 1960 | 2,243 | | 14.1% |
| 1970 | 2,248 | | 0.2% |
| 1980 | 2,498 | | 11.1% |
| 1990 | 2,579 | | 3.2% |
| 2000 | 2,677 | | 3.8% |
| 2010 | 2,657 | | −0.7% |
| 2020 | 2,568 | | −3.3% |
Source: US Decennial Census

== History ==
Straber Ford Bridge was listed on the National Register of Historic Places in 2009.

== Geography ==
According to the 2010 census, the township has a total area of 29.51 square miles (76.4 km^{2}), of which 29.43 square miles (76.2 km^{2}) (or 99.73%) is land and 0.08 square miles (0.21 km^{2}) (or 0.27%) is water.

=== Cities and towns ===
- Osgood

=== Unincorporated towns ===
- Otter Village

== Education ==
Center Township residents may obtain a free library card from the Osgood Public Library Central Library in Osgood, or its branch in Milan.
