= Otter Creek Township, Ripley County, Indiana =

Otter Creek Township
- Township
- Coordinates: 39°05′41″N 85°23′28″W
- Country: United States
- State: Indiana
- County: Ripley

Government
  - Type: Indiana township

Area
  - Total: 41.69 sq mi (108.0 km^{2})
  - Land: 41.66 sq mi (107.9 km^{2})
  - Water: 0.02 sq mi (0.052 km^{2})
- Elevation: 869 ft (265 m)

Population (2020)
  - Total: 1,319
  - Density: 31.66/sq mi (12.22/km^{2})
- Area code: 812
- FIPS code: 18-57276
- GNIS feature ID: 453698

Otter Creek Township is one of eleven townships in Ripley County, Indiana. As of the 2020 census, its population was 1,319 (down from 1,410 at 2010) and it contained 579 housing units.

Historical population
Census	Pop.	Note	%±
1890	1,605		—
1900	1,559		−2.9%
1910	1,645		5.5%
1920	1,405		−14.6%
1930	1,218		−13.3%
1940	1,268		4.1%
1950	1,206		−4.9%
1960	1,326		10.0%
1970	1,337		0.8%
1980	1,377		3.0%
1990	1,334		−3.1%
2000	1,339		0.4%
2010	1,410		5.3%
2020	1,319		−6.5%
Source: US Decennial Census

== Geography ==
According to the 2010 census, the township has a total area of 41.69 square miles (108.0 km^{2}), of which 41.66 square miles (107.9 km^{2}) (or 99.93%) is land and 0.02 square miles (0.052 km^{2}) (or 0.05%) is water.

=== Cities and towns ===
- Holton

=== Unincorporated towns ===
- Allen Crossing
- Dabney
- Lock Springs
