= Tyson United Methodist Church =

Historic church in Indiana, United States

- U.S. National Register of Historic Places
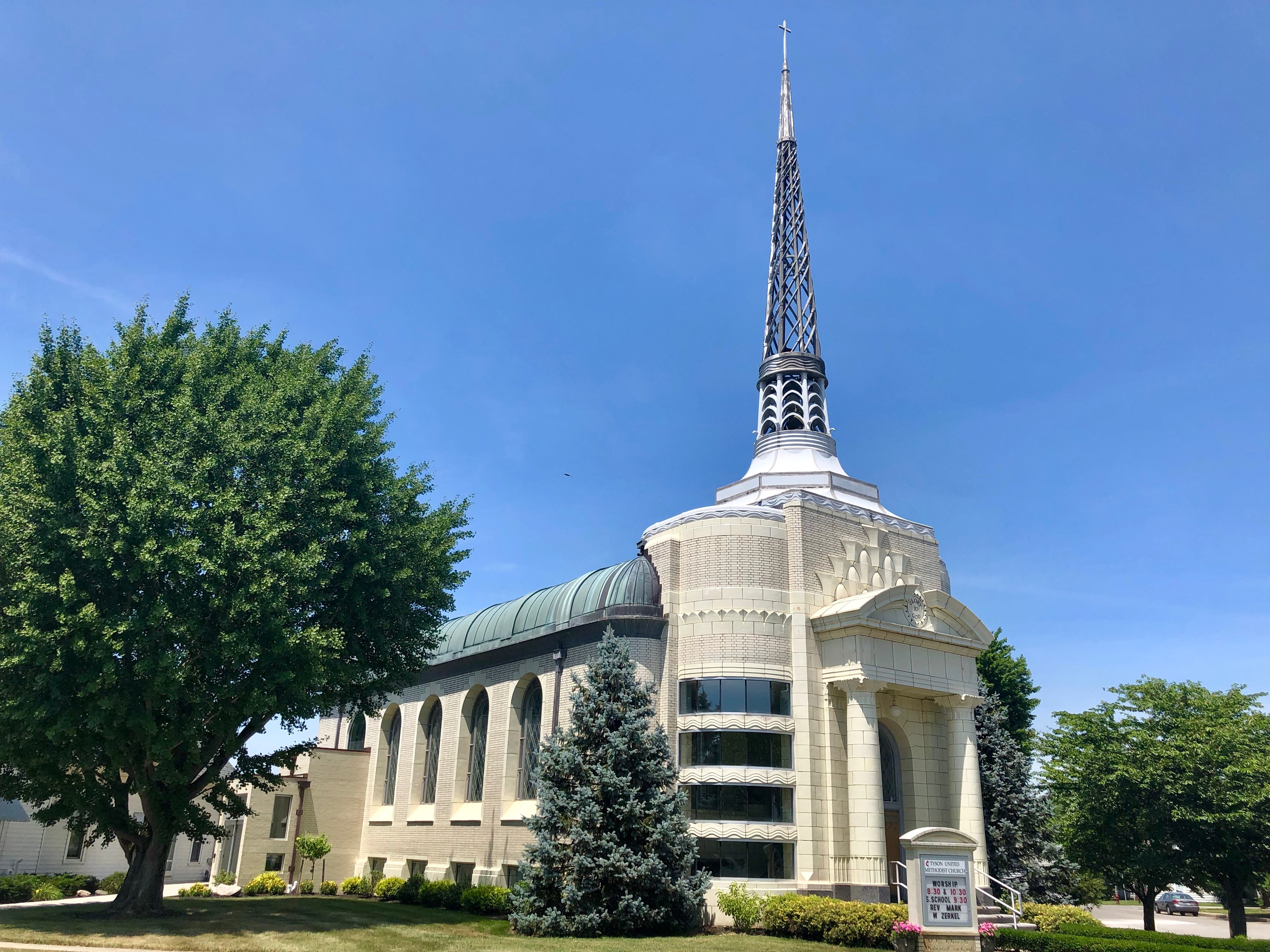
- Tyson United Methodist Church, July 2019

- Location within Indiana Location within the United States
- Location: 324 W. Tyson St., Versailles, Indiana
- Coordinates: 39°4′19″N 85°15′14″W
- Area: less than one acre
- Built: 1937
- Built by: Miles & Elliot
- Architect: McGuire, William; Shook, Wilbur
- Architectural style: Art Deco, Moderne
- NRHP reference No.: 94001106
- Added to NRHP: September 8, 1994

Tyson United Methodist Church, also known as Versailles United Methodist Church, is a historic Methodist church located at Versailles, Indiana. It was built in 1937, and is a two-story, Art Deco style church building sheathed in white glazed brick and terra cotta. It features a stylized Corinthian order front portico, round arched entry with bronze doors, and curved bays and ribbon windows. The church is topped by a tall, open lattice work spire of cast aluminum.

It was added to the National Register of Historic Places in 1994.
