= New Marion, Indiana =

- Unincorporated community and Census-designated place
- Location within Indiana Location within the United States
- Coordinates: 39°00′29″N 85°21′30″W
- Country: United States
- State: Indiana
- County: Ripley
- Township: Shelby
- Elevation: 919 ft (280 m)
- Time zone: UTC-5 (Eastern (EST))
  - Summer (DST): UTC-4 (EDT)
- ZIP code: 47023
- Area codes: 812, 930
- FIPS code: 18-53226
- GNIS feature ID: 2830515

New Marion is an unincorporated community in Shelby Township, Ripley County, in the U.S. state of Indiana.

== History ==
New Marion was laid out in 1832. The community's name most likely honors Francis Marion. A post office was established at New Marion in 1833, and remained in operation until it was discontinued in 1949.

== Demographics ==
The United States Census Bureau defined New Marion as a census designated place in the 2022 American Community Survey.
