= Delaware Township, Ripley County, Indiana =

Delaware Township
- Township
- Coordinates: 39°10′50″N 85°14′52″W
- Country: United States
- State: Indiana
- County: Ripley

Government
  - Type: Indiana township

Area
  - Total: 33.27 sq mi (86.2 km^{2})
  - Land: 33.21 sq mi (86.0 km^{2})
  - Water: 0.06 sq mi (0.16 km^{2})
- Elevation: 928 ft (283 m)

Population (2020)
  - Total: 1,513
  - Density: 45.56/sq mi (17.59/km^{2})
- Area code: 812
- FIPS code: 18-17524
- GNIS feature ID: 453262

Delaware Township is one of eleven townships in Ripley County, Indiana. As of the 2020 census, its population was 1,513 (up from 1,437 at 2010) and it contained 606 housing units.

Historical population
Census	Pop.	Note	%±
1890	1,214		—
1900	1,214		0.0%
1910	1,095		−9.8%
1920	1,001		−8.6%
1930	925		−7.6%
1940	959		3.7%
1950	1,057		10.2%
1960	1,009		−4.5%
1970	1,027		1.8%
1980	1,181		15.0%
1990	1,250		5.8%
2000	1,298		3.8%
2010	1,437		10.7%
2020	1,513		5.3%
Source: US Decennial Census

== Geography ==
According to the 2010 census, the township has a total area of 33.27 square miles (86.2 km^{2}), of which 33.21 square miles (86.0 km^{2}) (or 99.82%) is land and 0.06 square miles (0.16 km^{2}) (or 0.18%) is water.

=== Unincorporated towns ===
- Delaware
- Lookout
- Prattsburg

== Education ==
Delaware Township residents may obtain a free library card from the Osgood Public Library Central Library in Osgood, or its branch in Milan.
