= Versailles School and Tyson Auditorium =

- U.S. National Register of Historic Places
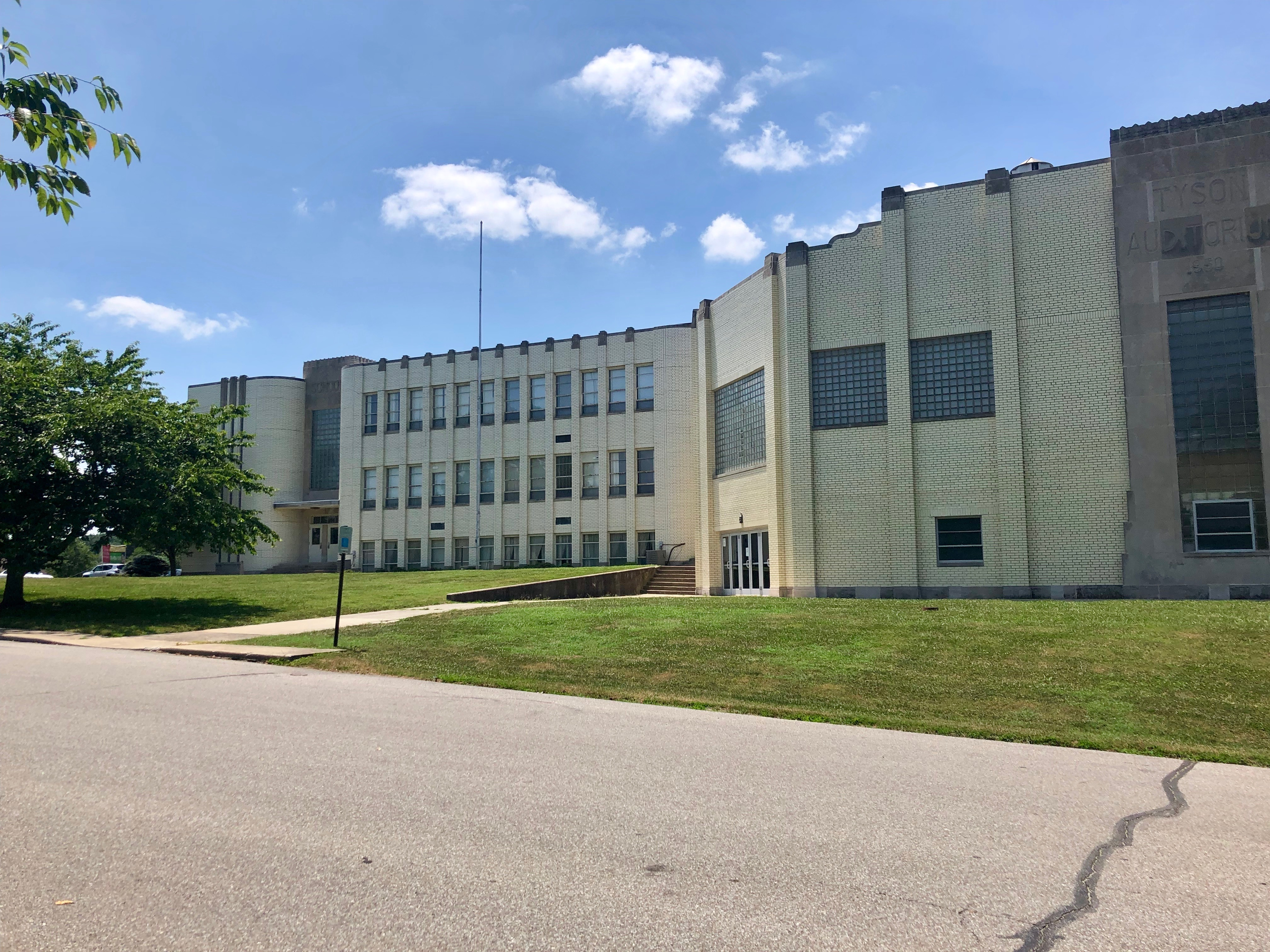
- View From East

- Location within Indiana Location within the United States
- Location: 100 South High St., Versailles, Indiana
- Coordinates: 39°4′18″N 85°15′19″W
- Area: 3.8 acres (1.5 ha)
- Built by: Gutzwiller, William A., et al.
- Architect: Hankel & Hanson
- Architectural style: Art Deco
- MPS: Indiana's Public Common and High Schools MPS
- NRHP reference No.: 06000309
- Added to NRHP: April 19, 2006

The Versailles School and Tyson Auditorium is a historic school and auditorium located at Versailles, Indiana. The school was built in 1938, and is a two-story, flat roofed Art Deco style building. The auditorium was added in 1950. James H. Tyson, a founder of Walgreens, funded the buildings. The famous Milan basketball team often played its games in the building, as their home court was often too small for all the spectators.

It was added to the National Register of Historic Places in 2006.

In 2011 it was listed on Indiana Landmarks 10 Most Endangered Landmarks list. In 2011, the school was transformed into apartments and the auditorium has now been reopened and renamed Tyson Activity Center.
