= Rexville, Indiana =

- Unincorporated community
- Location within Indiana Location within the United States
- Coordinates: 38°57′09″N 85°20′12″W
- Country: United States
- State: Indiana
- County: Ripley
- Township: Shelby
- Elevation: 919 ft (280 m)
- Time zone: UTC-5 (Eastern (EST))
  - Summer (DST): UTC-4 (EDT)
- ZIP code: 47250
- Area codes: 812, 930
- GNIS feature ID: 441921

Rexville is an unincorporated community in Shelby Township, Ripley County, in the U.S. state of Indiana.

== History ==
A post office was established at Rexville in 1870, and remained in operation until 1907. The community's name honors the Rex family of settlers.
