= Osgood, Indiana =

- Town
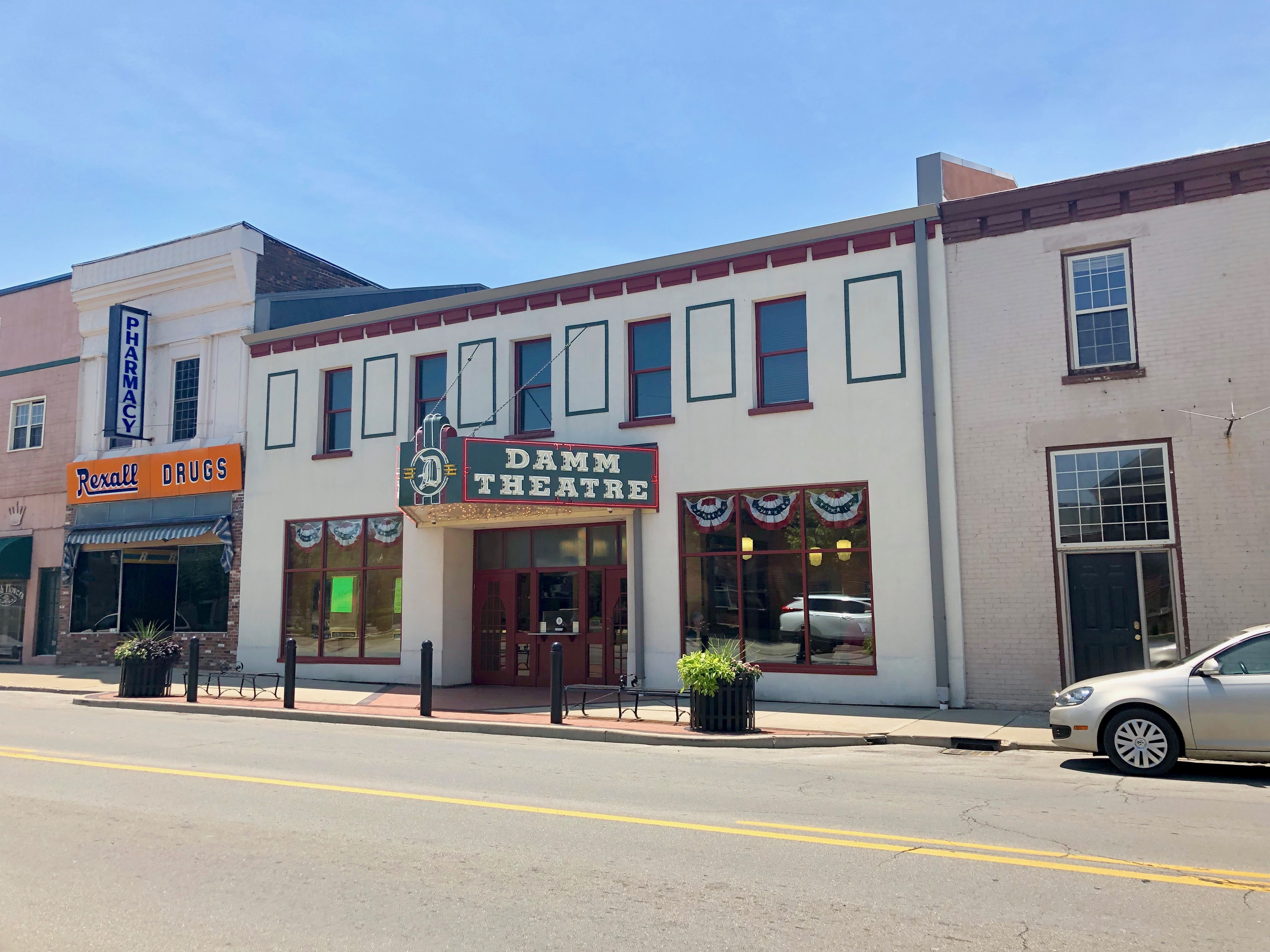
- The Damm Theatre in Downtown Osgood

- Seal

- Location of Osgood in Ripley County, Indiana.
- Coordinates: 39°07′32″N 85°17′36″W
- Country: United States
- State: Indiana
- County: Ripley
- Township: Center

Area
  - Total: 1.59 sq mi (4.11 km^{2})
  - Land: 1.55 sq mi (4.01 km^{2})
  - Water: 0.035 sq mi (0.09 km^{2})
- Elevation: 984 ft (300 m)

Population (2020)
  - Total: 1,587
  - Density: 1,024.4/sq mi (395.52/km^{2})
- Time zone: UTC-5 (Eastern (EST))
  - Summer (DST): UTC-4 (EDT)
- ZIP code: 47037
- Area code: 812
- FIPS code: 18-57132
- GNIS feature ID: 2396839
- Website: www.osgoodindiana.org

Osgood is a town in Center Township, Ripley County, in the U.S. state of Indiana. As of the 2020 census, Osgood had a population of 1,587.

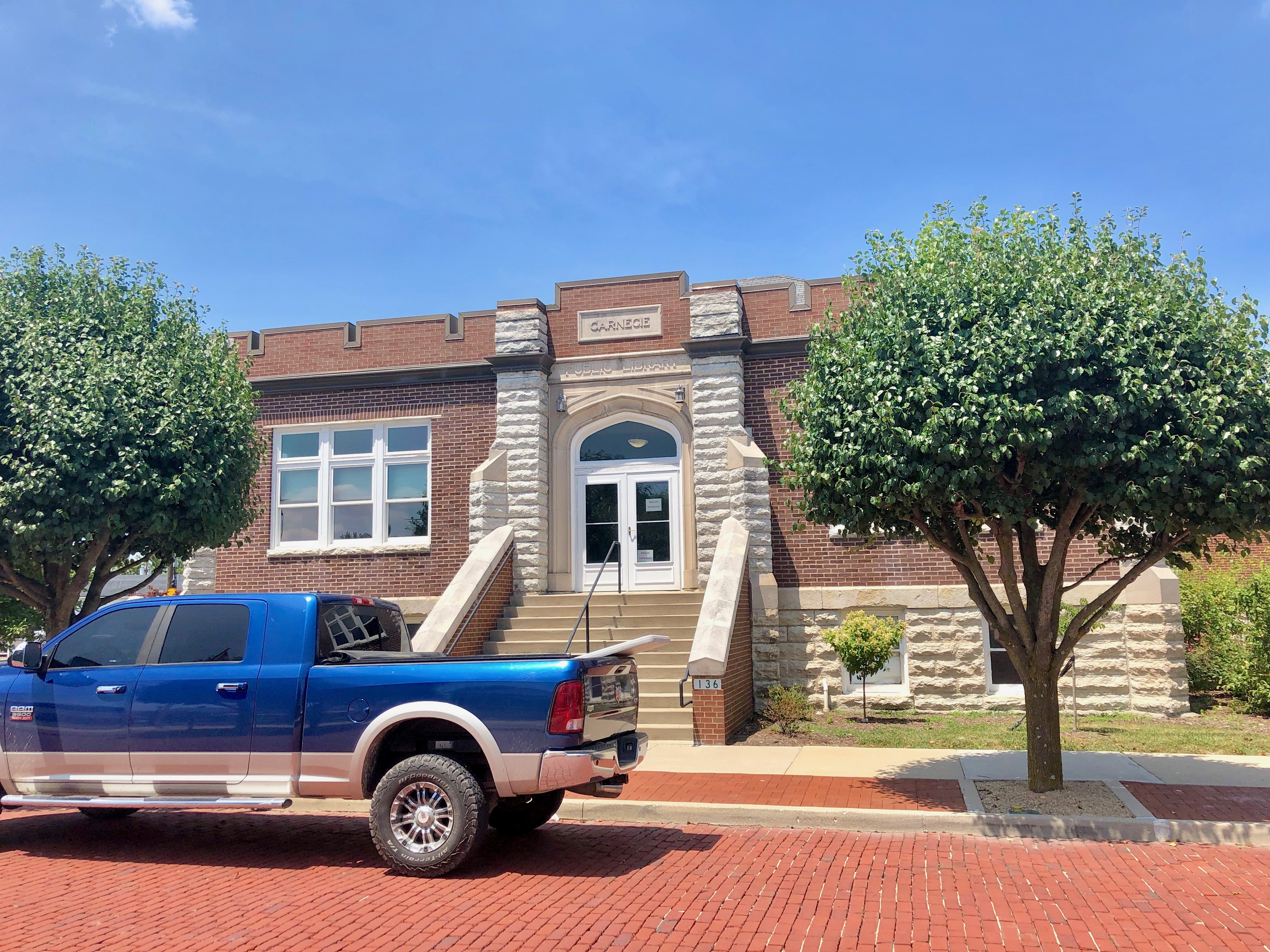
Osgood's Carnegie library

== History ==
Osgood was platted in 1854 when the railroad was extended to that point. The town was named for A. L. Osgood, a railroad official. A post office called Osgood has been in operation since 1855. In the 1890s, Osgood was a sundown town, where African Americans were not allowed to reside. By then, Osgood was still much more closely connected to Cincinnati than Indianapolis in terms of trade.

In 1999, the community received a $23 million bequest from the Gilmore and Golda Reynolds Foundation, which was established by two lifelong Osgood residents to assist the town government as well as local non-profit organizations.

== Geography ==
According to the 2010 census, Osgood has a total area of 1.48 square miles (3.83 km^{2}), of which 1.45 square miles (3.76 km^{2}) (or 97.97%) is land and 0.03 square miles (0.08 km^{2}) (or 2.03%) is water.

== Demographics ==
Historical population
Census	Pop.	Note	%±
1880	758		—
1890	841		10.9%
1900	1,035		23.1%
1910	1,169		12.9%
1920	1,093		−6.5%
1930	1,173		7.3%
1940	1,198		2.1%
1950	1,228		2.5%
1960	1,434		16.8%
1970	1,346		−6.1%
1980	1,554		15.5%
1990	1,688		8.6%
2000	1,669		−1.1%
2010	1,624		−2.7%
2020	1,587		−2.3%
U.S. Decennial Census

=== 2020 census ===
As of the 2020 census, Osgood had a population of 1,587. The median age was 38.0 years. 24.1% of residents were under the age of 18 and 18.9% of residents were 65 years of age or older. For every 100 females there were 102.4 males, and for every 100 females age 18 and over there were 98.4 males age 18 and over.

0.0% of residents lived in urban areas, while 100.0% lived in rural areas.

There were 643 households in Osgood, of which 29.4% had children under the age of 18 living in them. Of all households, 38.6% were married-couple households, 20.2% were households with a male householder and no spouse or partner present, and 29.2% were households with a female householder and no spouse or partner present. About 33.2% of all households were made up of individuals and 15.6% had someone living alone who was 65 years of age or older.

There were 728 housing units, of which 11.7% were vacant. The homeowner vacancy rate was 1.3% and the rental vacancy rate was 13.0%.

Racial composition as of the 2020 census
Race	Number	Percent
White	1,514	95.4%
Black or African American	6	0.4%
American Indian and Alaska Native	0	0.0%
Asian	6	0.4%
Native Hawaiian and Other Pacific Islander	0	0.0%
Some other race	7	0.4%
Two or more races	54	3.4%
Hispanic or Latino (of any race)	14	0.9%

=== 2010 census ===
As of the census of 2010, there were 1,624 people, 638 households, and 417 families living in the town. The population density was 1,120.0 inhabitants per square mile (432.4/km^{2}). There were 728 housing units at an average density of 502.1 per square mile (193.9/km^{2}). The racial makeup of the town was 98.2% White, 0.1% African American, 0.2% Native American, 0.1% from other races, and 1.5% from two or more races. Hispanic or Latino of any race were 1.3% of the population.

There were 638 households, of which 36.2% had children under the age of 18 living with them, 44.7% were married couples living together, 15.2% had a female householder with no husband present, 5.5% had a male householder with no wife present, and 34.6% were non-families. 31.2% of all households were made up of individuals, and 14% had someone living alone who was 65 years of age or older. The average household size was 2.45 and the average family size was 3.06.

The median age in the town was 36 years. 26.9% of residents were under the age of 18; 8.5% were between the ages of 18 and 24; 26% were from 25 to 44; 22.3% were from 45 to 64; and 16.4% were 65 years of age or older. The gender makeup of the town was 47.5% male and 52.5% female.

=== 2000 census ===
As of the census of 2000, there were 1,669 people, 668 households, and 424 families living in the town. The population density was 1,285.0 inhabitants per square mile (496.1/km^{2}). There were 731 housing units at an average density of 562.8 per square mile (217.3/km^{2}). The racial makeup of the town was 98.98% White, 0.12% African American, 0.54% Native American, 0.12% Asian, 0.06% from other races, and 0.18% from two or more races. Hispanic or Latino of any race were 0.96% of the population.

There were 668 households, out of which 34.0% had children under the age of 18 living with them, 47.2% were married couples living together, 12.3% had a female householder with no husband present, and 36.4% were non-families. 31.3% of all households were made up of individuals, and 16.5% had someone living alone who was 65 years of age or older. The average household size was 2.41 and the average family size was 3.03.

In the town, the population was spread out, with 27.4% under the age of 18, 8.0% from 18 to 24, 26.4% from 25 to 44, 19.7% from 45 to 64, and 18.6% who were 65 years of age or older. The median age was 36 years. For every 100 females, there were 89.7 males. For every 100 females age 18 and over, there were 83.4 males.

The median income for a household in the town was $29,659, and the median income for a family was $35,750. Males had a median income of $29,375 versus $20,938 for females. The per capita income for the town was $13,842. About 9.2% of families and 11.0% of the population were below the poverty line, including 10.4% of those under age 18 and 17.2% of those age 65 or over.

== Education ==
It is in the Jac-Cen-Del Community School Corporation.

The town has a lending library, the Osgood Public Library.

== Notable people ==
- Mary Aikins Currie, Indiana State Auditor from 1970 to 1978.
- Jasper S. Bilby, surveyor
- Grover Hartley, baseball player and umpire

== See also ==
- List of sundown towns in the United States
