= Versailles, Indiana =

- Town
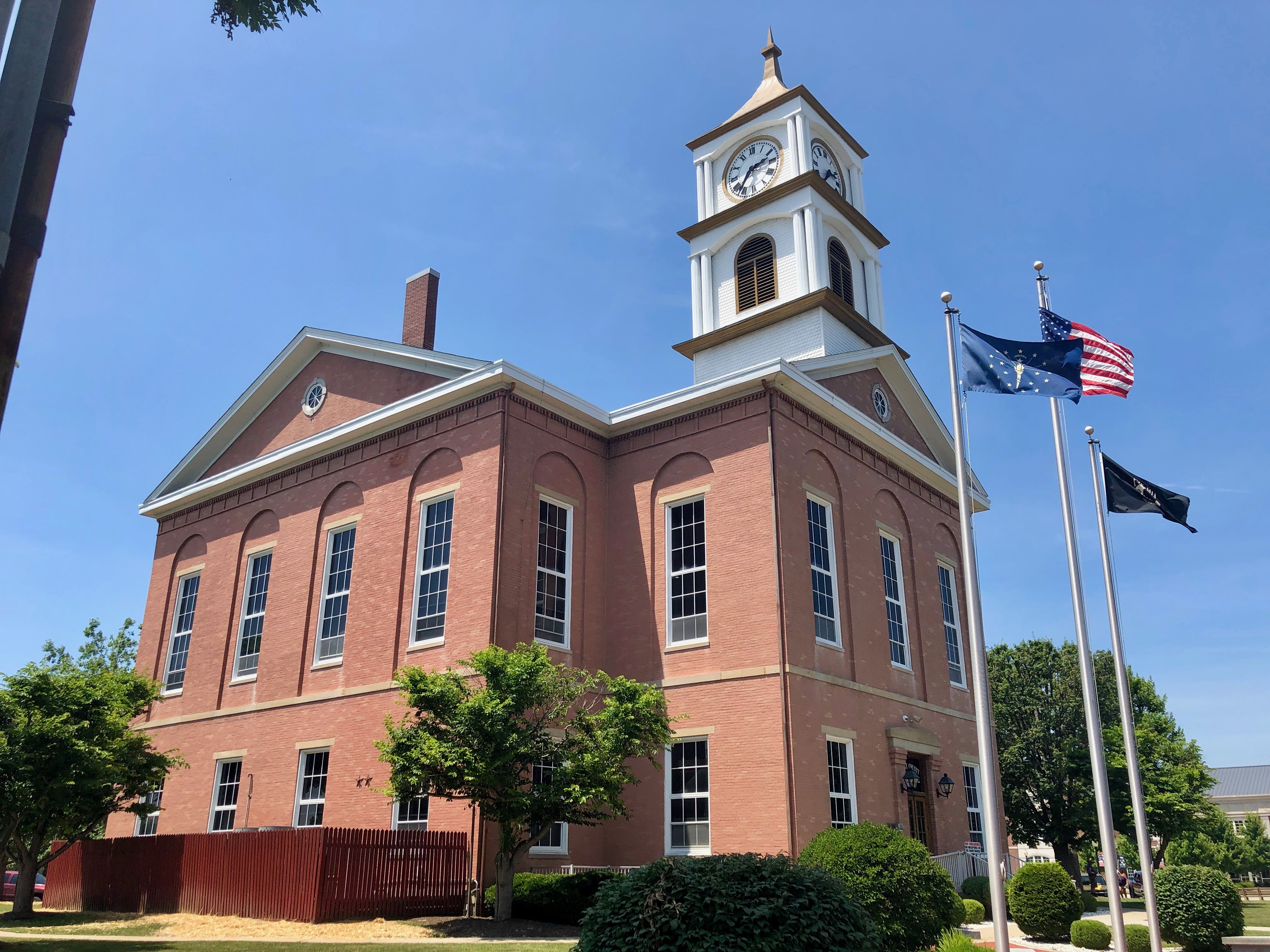
- Ripley County Courthouse in Versailles is listed on the National Register of Historic Places

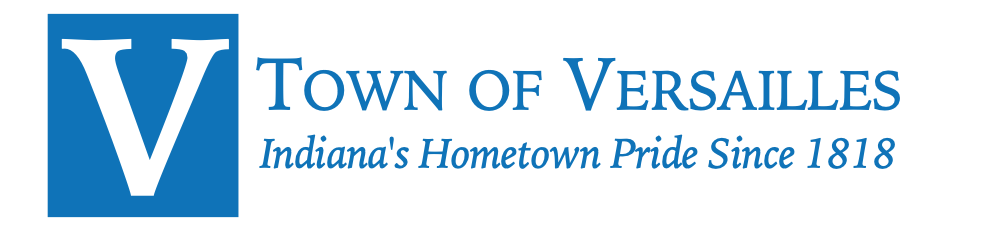
- Logo

- Location of Versailles in Ripley County, Indiana.
- Coordinates: 39°03′48″N 85°15′12″W
- Country: United States
- State: Indiana
- County: Ripley
- Township: Johnson

Area
  - Total: 1.57 sq mi (4.06 km^{2})
  - Land: 1.57 sq mi (4.06 km^{2})
  - Water: 0 sq mi (0.00 km^{2})
- Elevation: 984 ft (300 m)

Population (2020)
  - Total: 2,184
  - Density: 1,392.0/sq mi (537.44/km^{2})
- Time zone: UTC-5 (Eastern (EST))
  - Summer (DST): UTC-4 (EDT)
- ZIP code: 47042
- Area code: 812
- FIPS code: 18-78974
- GNIS feature ID: 2397715
- Website: Town of Versailles

Versailles /vərˈseɪlz/ is a town in Johnson Township, Ripley County, in the U.S. state of Indiana. As of the 2020 census, Versailles had a population of 2,184. The town is the county seat of Ripley County.

== History ==
It was decided in 1818 a county seat should be located at Versailles. The town of Versailles was laid out in 1819. It was named after the Palace of Versailles.

A post office has been in operation at Versailles since 1823.

The Ripley County Courthouse, Fernando G. Taylor House, Tyson United Methodist Church, and Versailles School and Tyson Auditorium are listed on the National Register of Historic Places.

== Geography ==
According to the 2010 census, Versailles has a total area of 1.51 square miles (3.91 km^{2}), all land. Laughery Creek is the major stream in the area, and was dammed in 1954 to form 230-acre Versailles Lake, within the Versailles State Park.

== Demographics ==
Historical population
Census	Pop.	Note	%±
1850	412		—
1870	495		—
1880	455		−8.1%
1890	421		−7.5%
1900	501		19.0%
1910	486		−3.0%
1920	413		−15.0%
1930	523		26.6%
1940	582		11.3%
1950	886		52.2%
1960	1,158		30.7%
1970	1,080		−6.7%
1980	1,560		44.4%
1990	1,791		14.8%
2000	1,784		−0.4%
2010	2,113		18.4%
2020	2,184		3.4%
U.S. Decennial Census

=== 2020 census ===
As of the 2020 census, Versailles had a population of 2,184. The median age was 39.5 years. 20.8% of residents were under the age of 18 and 19.5% of residents were 65 years of age or older. For every 100 females there were 90.6 males, and for every 100 females age 18 and over there were 90.5 males age 18 and over.

0.0% of residents lived in urban areas, while 100.0% lived in rural areas.

There were 928 households in Versailles, of which 27.2% had children under the age of 18 living in them. Of all households, 36.5% were married-couple households, 17.5% were households with a male householder and no spouse or partner present, and 37.6% were households with a female householder and no spouse or partner present. About 37.1% of all households were made up of individuals and 17.1% had someone living alone who was 65 years of age or older.

There were 1,044 housing units, of which 11.1% were vacant. The homeowner vacancy rate was 1.9% and the rental vacancy rate was 13.1%.

Racial composition as of the 2020 census
Race	Number	Percent
White	2,054	94.0%
Black or African American	11	0.5%
American Indian and Alaska Native	8	0.4%
Asian	5	0.2%
Native Hawaiian and Other Pacific Islander	0	0.0%
Some other race	6	0.3%
Two or more races	100	4.6%
Hispanic or Latino (of any race)	30	1.4%

=== 2010 census ===
As of the census of 2010, there were 2,113 people, 874 households, and 538 families living in the town. The population density was 1,399.3 inhabitants per square mile (540.3/km^{2}). There were 999 housing units at an average density of 661.6 per square mile (255.4/km^{2}). The racial makeup of the town was 98.2% White, 0.2% African American, 0.3% Asian, 0.1% from other races, and 1.2% from two or more races. Hispanic or Latino of any race were 0.4% of the population.

There were 874 households, of which 31.0% had children under the age of 18 living with them, 42.6% were married couples living together, 14.4% had a female householder with no husband present, 4.6% had a male householder with no wife present, and 38.4% were non-families. 33.3% of all households were made up of individuals, and 17.3% had someone living alone who was 65 years of age or older. The average household size was 2.32 and the average family size was 2.95.

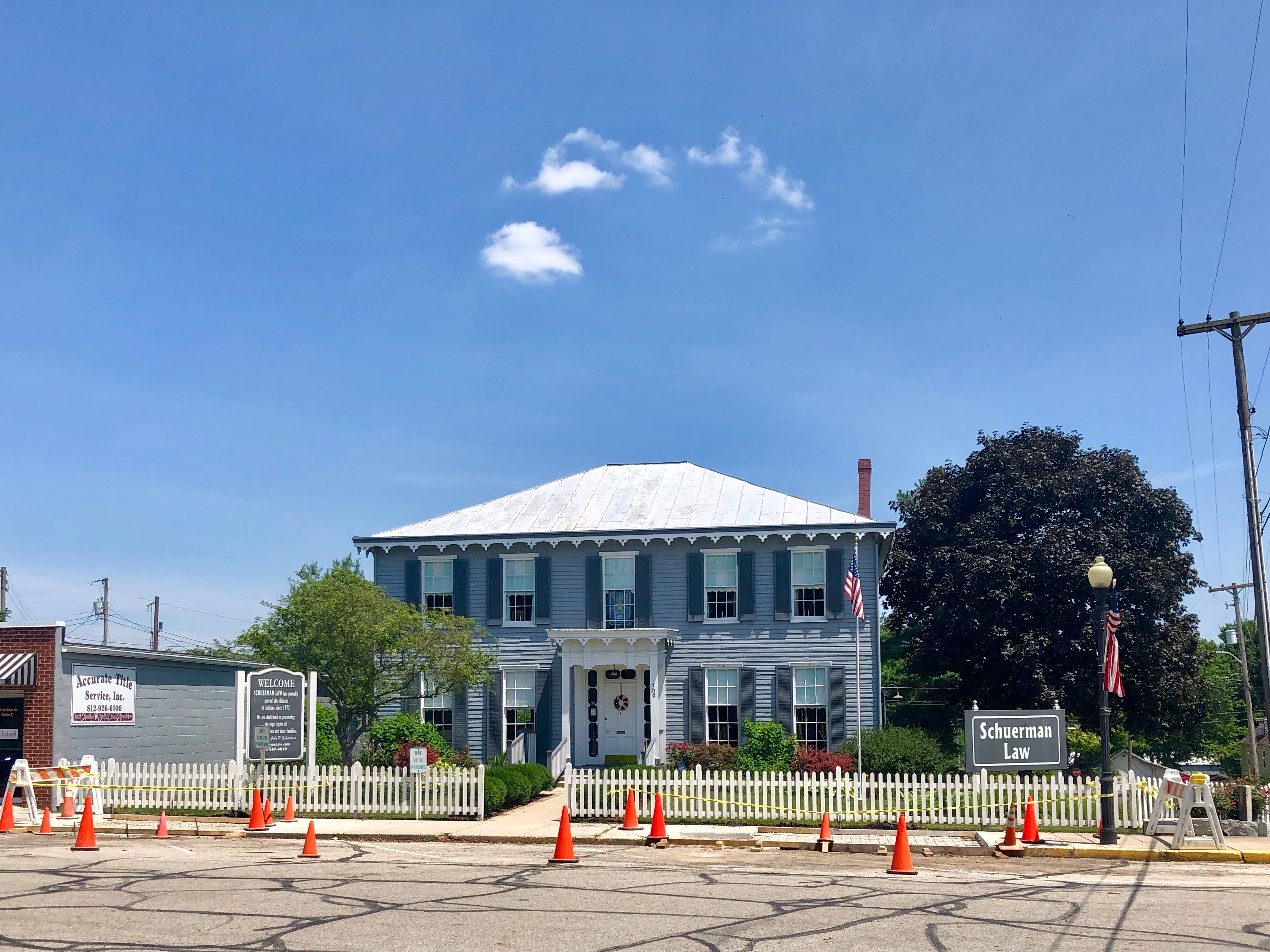
Fernando G. Taylor House in Versailles

The median age in the town was 37.9 years. 23.6% of residents were under the age of 18; 10.6% were between the ages of 18 and 24; 24.5% were from 25 to 44; 25.4% were from 45 to 64; and 15.9% were 65 years of age or older. The gender makeup of the town was 47.5% male and 52.5% female.

=== 2000 census ===
As of the census of 2000, there were 1,784 people, 746 households, and 492 families living in the town. The population density was 1,168.9 inhabitants per square mile (451.3/km^{2}). There were 803 housing units at an average density of 526.1 per square mile (203.1/km^{2}). The racial makeup of the town was 98.82% White, 0.06% African American, 0.45% Native American, 0.17% Asian, 0.11% from other races, and 0.39% from two or more races. Hispanic or Latino of any race were 0.50% of the population.

There were 746 households, out of which 31.6% had children under the age of 18 living with them, 50.4% were married couples living together, 12.5% had a female householder with no husband present, and 34.0% were non-families. 31.5% of all households were made up of individuals, and 16.1% had someone living alone who was 65 years of age or older. The average household size was 2.36 and the average family size was 2.93.

In the town, the population was spread out, with 25.7% under the age of 18, 10.1% from 18 to 24, 26.2% from 25 to 44, 22.2% from 45 to 64, and 15.8% who were 65 years of age or older. The median age was 36 years. For every 100 females, there were 83.9 males. For every 100 females age 18 and over, there were 84.0 males.

The median income for a household in the town was $35,144, and the median income for a family was $41,442. Males had a median income of $31,607 versus $22,237 for females. The per capita income for the town was $17,352. About 8.3% of families and 8.7% of the population were below the poverty line, including 9.3% of those under age 18 and 6.8% of those age 65 or over.

== Education ==
It is in the South Ripley Community School Corporation. Most students in Versailles attend South Ripley Elementary School for grades K through 6 and South Ripley Junior/Senior High School for grades 7 through 12.

The town has a lending library, the Tyson Public Library.

== Notable people ==
- Amos W. Jackson (1904–1972), judge and resident of Versailles
- Rowland H. Jackson (1872–1957), politician and resident of Versailles
- Harry Wheeler, 19th Century baseball player
