= Holton, Indiana =

- Town
- Town of Holton
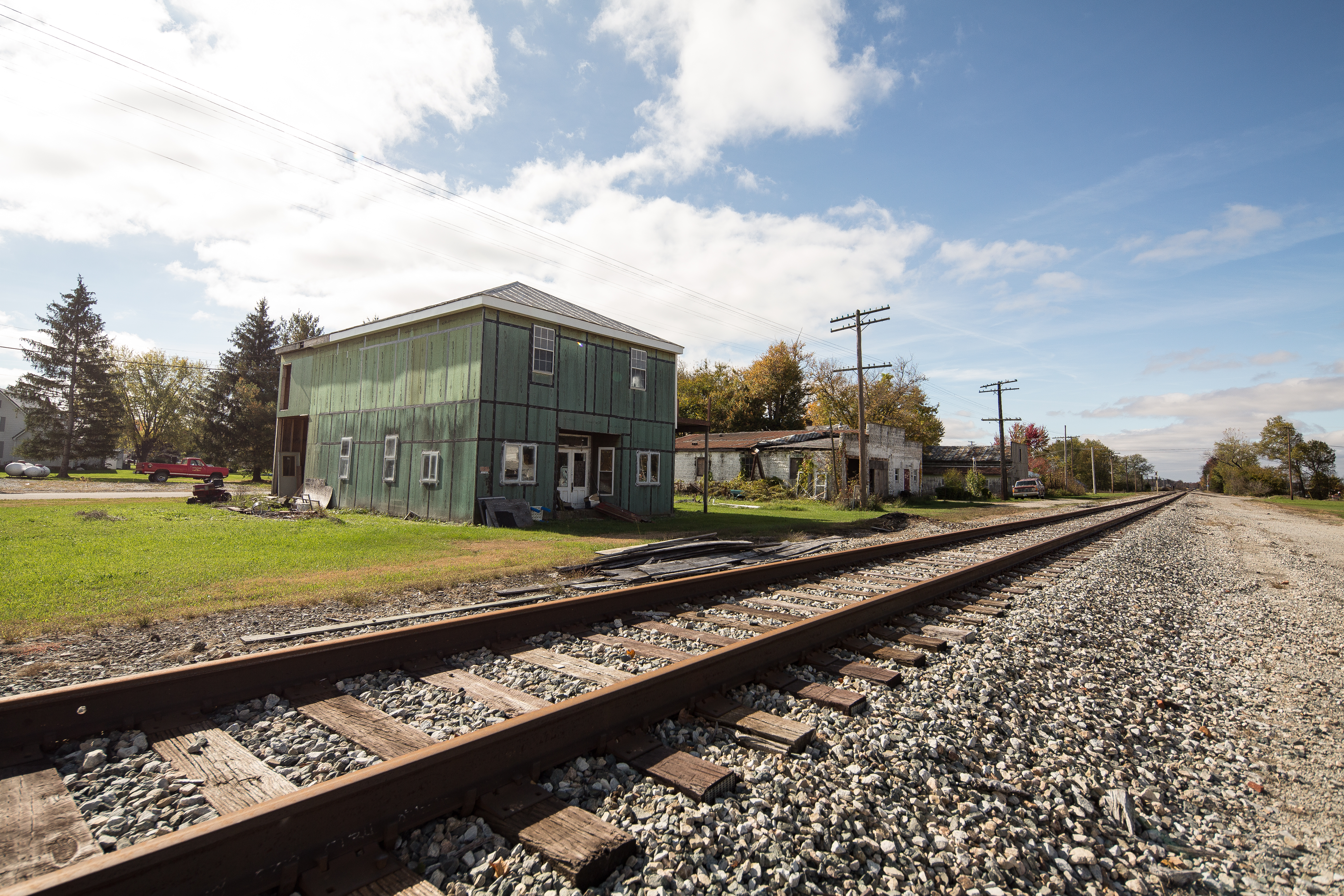

- Location of Holton in Ripley County, Indiana.
- Coordinates: 39°04′29″N 85°22′47″W
- Country: United States
- State: Indiana
- County: Ripley
- Township: Otter Creek

Area
  - Total: 1.81 sq mi (4.69 km^{2})
  - Land: 1.81 sq mi (4.69 km^{2})
  - Water: 0 sq mi (0.00 km^{2})
- Elevation: 909 ft (277 m)

Population (2020)
  - Total: 417
  - Density: 230.0/sq mi (88.82/km^{2})
- Time zone: UTC-5 (EST)
  - Summer (DST): UTC-5 (EST)
- ZIP code: 47023
- Area code: 812
- FIPS code: 18-34366
- GNIS feature ID: 2396998

Holton is a town in Otter Creek Township, Ripley County, in the U.S. state of Indiana. As of the 2020 census, Holton had a population of 417.

== History ==
Holton was platted in 1854, when the Ohio and Mississippi Railway was extended to that point. The town derived its name from Jesse Holman, the original owner of the town site. A post office has been in operation at Holton since 1854.

On March 2, 2012, an EF3 tornado severely damaged the town of Holton and killed three people.

== Geography ==
According to the 2010 census, Holton has a total area of 1.81 square miles (4.69 km^{2}), all land.

== Demographics ==
Historical population
Census	Pop.	Note	%±
1880	366		—
1980	487		—
1990	451		−7.4%
2000	407		−9.8%
2010	480		17.9%
2020	417		−13.1%
U.S. Decennial Census

=== 2010 census ===
As of the census of 2010, there were 480 people, 171 households, and 119 families living in the town. The population density was 265.2 inhabitants per square mile (102.4/km^{2}). There were 199 housing units at an average density of 109.9 per square mile (42.4/km^{2}). The racial makeup of the town was 96.3% White, 1.5% African American, 0.2% Native American, 0.4% from other races, and 1.7% from two or more races. Hispanic or Latino of any race were 0.4% of the population.

There were 171 households, of which 39.8% had children under the age of 18 living with them, 49.7% were married couples living together, 14.6% had a female householder with no husband present, 5.3% had a male householder with no wife present, and 30.4% were non-families. 23.4% of all households were made up of individuals, and 9.3% had someone living alone who was 65 years of age or older. The average household size was 2.81 and the average family size was 3.33.

The median age in the town was 32.5 years. 30.4% of residents were under the age of 18; 8% were between the ages of 18 and 24; 27.3% were from 25 to 44; 22.8% were from 45 to 64; and 11.7% were 65 years of age or older. The gender makeup of the town was 49.8% male and 50.2% female.

=== 2000 census ===
As of the census of 2000, there were 407 people, 148 households, and 107 families living in the town. The population density was 226.9 inhabitants per square mile (87.6/km^{2}). There were 158 housing units at an average density of 88.1 per square mile (34.0/km^{2}). The racial makeup of the town was 99.26% White, 0.25% Asian, 0.49% from other races. Hispanic or Latino of any race were 1.47% of the population.

There were 148 households, out of which 38.5% had children under the age of 18 living with them, 54.1% were married couples living together, 12.8% had a female householder with no husband present, and 27.7% were non-families. 25.0% of all households were made up of individuals, and 10.8% had someone living alone who was 65 years of age or older. The average household size was 2.75 and the average family size was 3.18.

In the town, the population was spread out, with 31.0% under the age of 18, 9.8% from 18 to 24, 30.0% from 25 to 44, 18.9% from 45 to 64, and 10.3% who were 65 years of age or older. The median age was 33 years. For every 100 females, there were 92.9 males. For every 100 females age 18 and over, there were 91.2 males.

The median income for a household in the town was $28,750, and the median income for a family was $33,438. Males had a median income of $29,219 versus $19,167 for females. The per capita income for the town was $12,357. About 14.5% of families and 22.6% of the population were below the poverty line, including 33.0% of those under age 18 and 10.5% of those age 65 or over.

== Education ==
It is in the South Ripley Community School Corporation.
