= Ripley County Courthouse (Indiana) =

- U.S. National Register of Historic Places
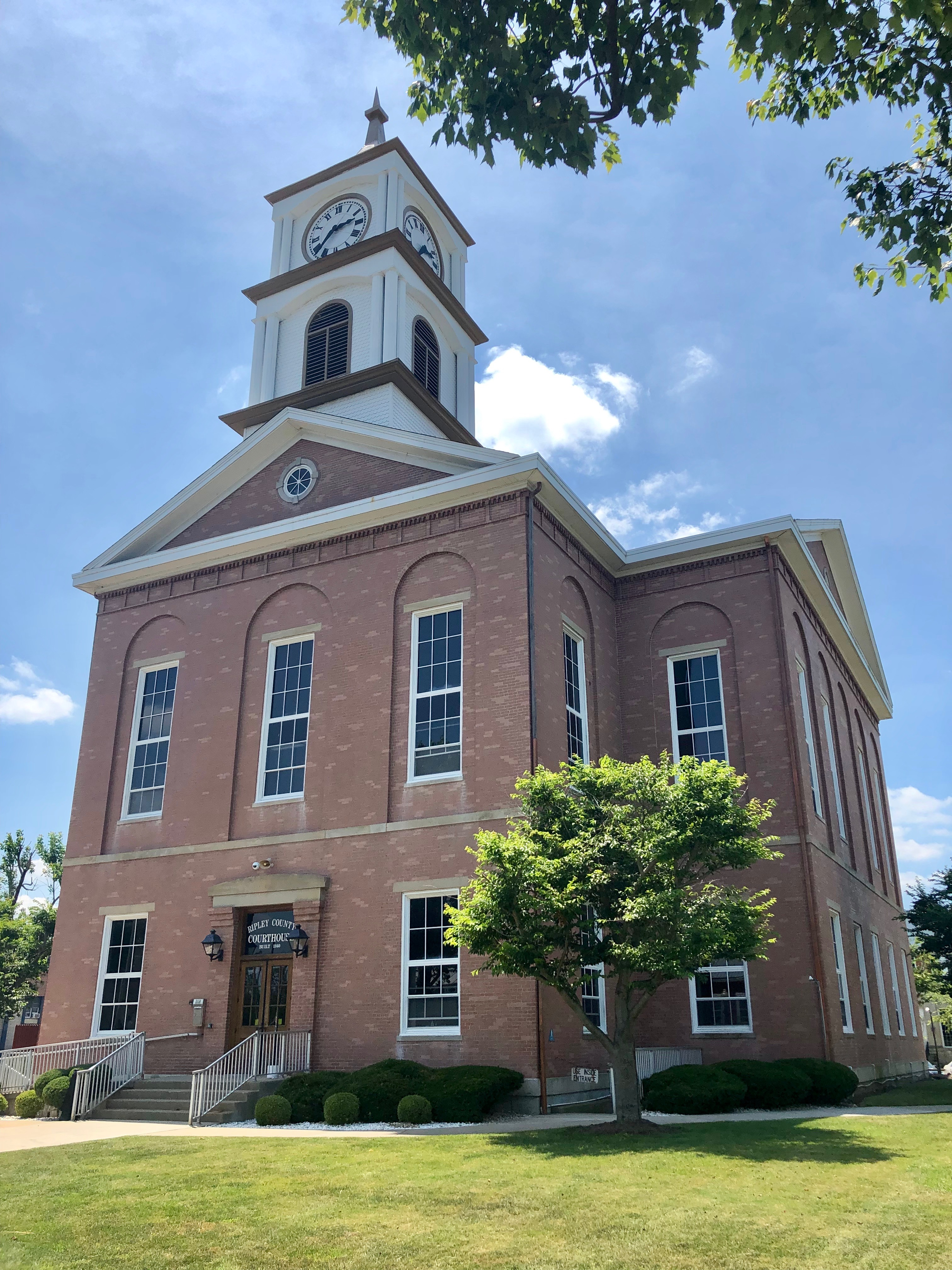
- Ripley County Courthouse, July 2019

- Location within Indiana Location within the United States
- Interactive map showing the location of Ripley County Courthouse
- Location: 115 N. Main St., Versailles, Indiana
- Coordinates: 39°4′19″N 85°15′6″W
- Area: less than one acre
- Built: 1860-1863
- Architect: Pattison, Thomas; Yater, James L.
- Architectural style: Greek Revival
- NRHP reference No.: 09000762
- Added to NRHP: September 24, 2009

Ripley County Courthouse is a historic courthouse located at Versailles, Indiana. It was built between 1860 and 1863, and is a three-story, cross plan, Greek Revival style brick building. It features a bell tower and high pitched gable roof. An addition was constructed in 1971–1972.

It was added to the National Register of Historic Places in 2009.
