= Big Oaks National Wildlife Refuge =

United States National Wildlife Refuge in Indiana

- IUCN category IV (habitat/species management area)
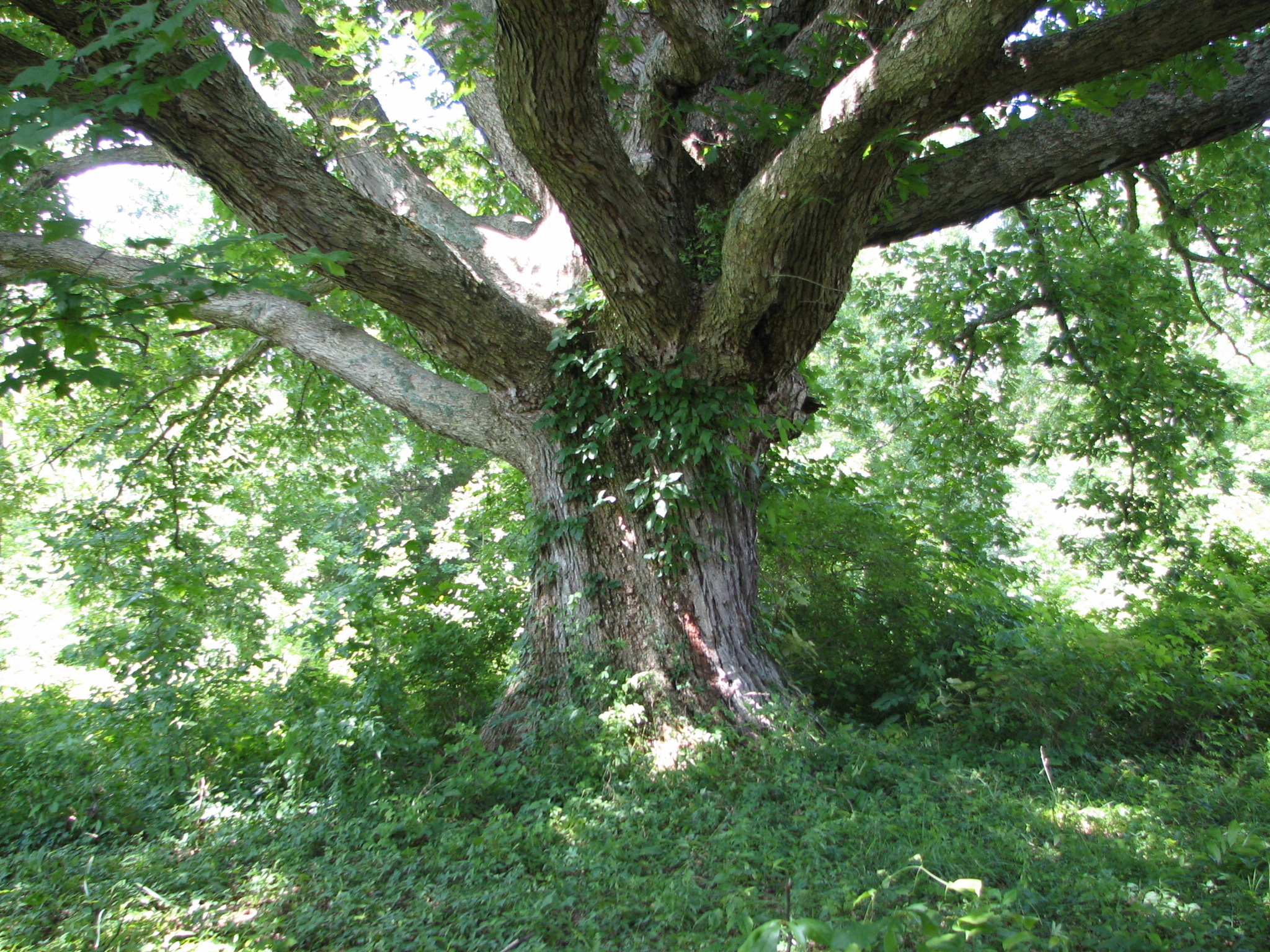

- Location within the United States Location within Indiana
- Location: Ripley County, Jefferson County, Jennings County, Indiana, United States
- Nearest city: Madison, Indiana
- Coordinates: 38°57′00″N 85°24′00″W
- Area: 50,000 acres (200 km^{2})
- Established: 2000
- Governing body: U.S. Fish and Wildlife Service
- Website: Big Oaks National Wildlife Refuge

Big Oaks National Wildlife Refuge is a 50,000-acre (202 km^{2}) wildlife refuge operated by the United States Fish and Wildlife Service in southeast Indiana, United States, near Madison, Indiana. The refuge is the largest of Indiana's three National Wildlife Refuges (Muscatatuck National Wildlife Refuge near Seymour, IN and Patoka River National Wildlife Refuge and Management Area near Oakland City, IN), and is located in parts of Ripley, Jefferson, and Jennings counties.

Monitoring infrastructure spanning a wooded stream at Big Oaks National Wildlife Refuge, photographed in 2026.

Standing dead trees in Old Timbers Lake at Big Oaks National Wildlife Refuge, photographed in 2026.

The refuge was formed in 2000 after a 1989 order to gradually close the Jefferson Proving Ground, a World War II era munitions testing facility, which was completed by 1995. The refuge is located north of the historic firing line and surrounds a 1,000-acre (4 km^{2}) parcel operated by the Indiana Air National Guard. A zone used for firing tests remains off limit to the public due to the prohibitive cost of cleanup.

Due to the past use of the property as a depleted uranium ordnance testing facility by the United States Army, all visitors must view a safety video and sign an Acknowledgement of Danger form annually prior to entering the refuge. Public use is limited to 4,000 acres on the northeast corner of the refuge surrounding Old Timbers Lake.

Over 200 species of birds and 46 species of mammals are found on the refuge.

Public uses of the refuge include hunting (white-tailed deer and wild turkey), fishing, and bird-watching.

Collin's Ford Bridge, Marble Creek Bridge, Oakdale School, also known as Building 401, and Old Timbers are listed on the National Register of Historic Places.
