= Ripley County, Indiana =

County in Indiana, United States

- County
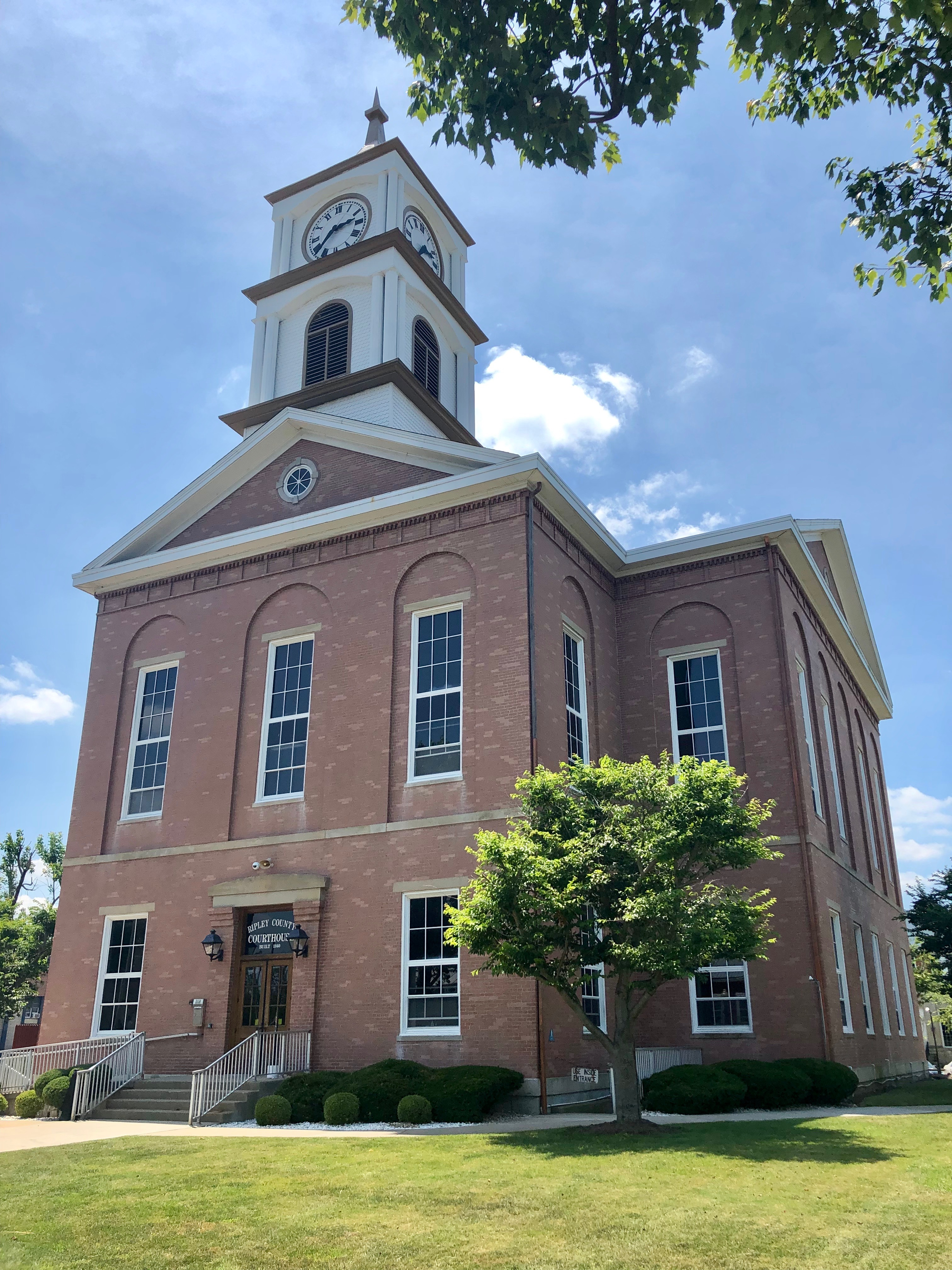
- Ripley County Courthouse in Versailles

- Location within the U.S. state of Indiana
- Coordinates: 39°06′N 85°16′W
- Country: United States
- State: Indiana
- Founded: December 27, 1816
- Named for: Eleazer Wheelock Ripley
- Seat: Versailles
- Largest city: Batesville

Area
  - Total: 448.06 sq mi (1,160.5 km^{2})
  - Land: 446.43 sq mi (1,156.2 km^{2})
  - Water: 1.64 sq mi (4.2 km^{2}) 0.37%

Population (2020)
  - Total: 28,995
  - Estimate (2025): 29,434 ▲
  - Density: 64.949/sq mi (25.077/km^{2})
- Time zone: UTC−5 (Eastern)
  - Summer (DST): UTC−4 (EDT)
- Congressional district: 6th
- Website: http://www.ripleycounty.com/
- Indiana county number 69; FIPS Code 137

Ripley County is a county located at the southeastern corner of the U.S. state of Indiana. According to the 2020 Census, the population was 28,995. The county seat is Versailles.

== History ==
Ripley County was formed on December 27, 1816, in the same legislative act that created Jennings County. It was named for Gen. Eleazer Wheelock Ripley, an officer in the War of 1812, who figured in the Battle of Lundy's Lane and the Siege of Fort Erie during 1814.

== Geography ==
The county seat of Ripley County is Versailles, Indiana. It was selected as the county seat in 1818, and was laid out in 1819.

According to the 2010 census, the county has a total area of 448.06 square miles (1,160.5 km^{2}), of which 446.43 square miles (1,156.2 km^{2}) (or 99.64%) is land and 1.64 square miles (4.2 km^{2}) (or 0.37%) is water.

Overview of townships
Township	Established Year	Area mi^{2}	Area km^{2}	Population	Incorporated Towns
Adams	1858	43.79	113.42	5119	Batesville (part), Sunman
Brown	1823	53.67	139	1597	
Center	1858	29.51	76.43	2657	Osgood
Delaware	1823	33.27	86.17	1437	
Franklin	1823	36.6	94.79	3773	Milan (part)
Jackson	1823	29.87	77.36	965	Napoleon
Johnson	1823	54.98	142.4	3685	Versailles
Laughery	1819	25.97	67.26	4736	Batesville (part)
Otter Creek	1858	41.69	107.98	1410	Holton
Shelby	1823	69.39	179.72	999	
Washington	1823	29.33	75.96	2440	Milan (part)
Ripley County	1816	448.06	1160.471	28,181	

=== Unincorporated communities ===
- Allen Crossing
- Ballstown
- Behlmer Corner
- Benham
- Clinton
- Correct
- Cross Plains
- Cross Roads
- Dabney
- Delaware
- Dewberry
- Elrod
- Friendship
- Haney Corner
- Lookout
- Morris
- Negangards Corner
- New Marion
- Old Milan
- Olean
- Otter Village
- Penntown
- Pierceville
- Prattsburg
- Rexville
- Spades
- Stringtown

=== Ghost towns ===
- Saint Magdalen

=== Adjacent counties ===
- Dearborn County (east)
- Decatur County (northwest)
- Franklin County (north)
- Jefferson County (south)
- Jennings County (west)
- Ohio County (east–southeast)
- Switzerland County (at southeast tip)

=== Major highways ===
- State Road 350 – begins at intersection with US 421 at Osgood, runs east through Delaware and Pierceville into Dearborn County.
- Interstate 74 – runs east–west across northern tip of county.
- State Road 46 – runs east–west across northern tip of county, paralleling Interstate 74 on its south side.
- State Road 48 – runs east–west across upper portion of county, through Napoleon.
- State Road 62 – begins at intersection with State Road 129, north of Cross Plains. Runs east through Friendship to Dearborn County.
- State Road 101 – begins at intersection with US Route 50 near east county line. Runs north to Penntown.
- State Road 129 – begins at intersection with State Road 46 east of Batesville, runs south to Versailles, then SSE through Cross Plains into Switzerland County.
- State Road 229 – enters from Franklin County at Batesville, runs SSW to Ballstown then south and west to Napoleon. Runs west to Decatur County.
- US Route 50 – runs east–west across middle of county, through Holton and Versailles.
- US Route 421 - enters from Decatur County near northwest tip of Ripley County. Runs SSE to Versailles, then SSW into Jefferson County.

=== National protected area ===
- Big Oaks National Wildlife Refuge (part)

== Climate and weather ==
Versailles, Indiana

Climate chart (precipitation, max. and min. temperature)
J	F	M	A	M	J	J	A	S	O	N	D
3.1 35 18	2.7 40 21	3.8 51 30	4.1 62 38	5.3 71 47	4 79 57	3.9 84 61	4.6 82 59	2.9 76 51	3 65 40	3.1 52 32	3.5 40 23
- █ Average max. and min. temperatures in °F
- █ Precipitation totals in inches
- Source: The Weather Channel
Metric conversion
J	F	M	A	M	J	J	A	S	O	N	D
79 2 −8	69 4 −6	96 11 −1	104 17 3	134 22 8	102 26 14	100 29 16	116 28 15	74 24 11	76 18 4	78 11 0	88 4 −5
- █ Average max. and min. temperatures in °C
- █ Precipitation totals in mm

In recent years, average temperatures in Versailles have ranged from a low of 18 °F (−8 °C) in January to a high of 84 °F (29 °C) in July, although a record low of −28 °F (−33 °C) was recorded in January 1994 and a record high of 100 °F (38 °C) was recorded in July 1999. Average monthly precipitation ranged from 2.71 inches (69 mm) in February to 5.27 inches (134 mm) in May.

== Government ==
The county government is a constitutional body, and is granted specific powers by the Constitution of Indiana, and by the Indiana Code.

County Council: The county council is the legislative branch of the county government and controls all the spending and revenue collection in the county. Representatives are elected from county districts, serving four-year terms. They are responsible for setting salaries, the annual budget, and special spending. The council also has limited authority to impose local taxes, in the form of an income and property tax that is subject to state level approval, excise taxes, and service taxes.

Board of Commissioners: The Board of Commissioners is the executive body of the county. Commissioners are elected county–wide in staggered four–year terms. One commissioner serves as board president. They are charged with executing the acts legislated by the council, collecting revenue, and managing the day-to-day functions of the county government.

County Officials: The county has several other elected offices, including sheriff, coroner, auditor, treasurer, recorder, surveyor and circuit court clerk. Each of these elected officers serves a term of four years and oversees a different part of county government. Members elected to county government positions are required to declare party affiliations and to be residents of the county.

State Government: At the State level, Ripley County is divided in its representation. Adams and Laughery Townships are located in the 55th House District which is represented by Rep. Cindy Ziemke. The rest of Ripley County is located in the 67th district represented by Rep. Randy Frye. Adams and Laughery Townships are in the 42nd Senate District represented by State Senator Jean Leising. The rest of Ripley County is in Senate District 43 represented by Senator Chip Perfect.

Federal Government: Ripley County is part of Indiana's 6th congressional district and is represented in Congress by Republican Greg Pence. Along with the rest of Indiana, its senators are Mike Braun and Todd Young.

== Politics ==
Ripley County has been a Republican stronghold for much of its history. In only 3 elections since 1912 has the county supported a Democratic presidential candidate (the most recent case being the 1964 landslide election). The Republican trend in the county has increased greatly since 2016, and in 2024 it was the third most Republican county in the state.

United States presidential election results for Ripley County, Indiana
Year	Republican		Democratic		Third party(ies)	
Year	No.	%	No.	%	No.	%
1888	2,404	49.77%	2,381	49.30%	45	0.93%
1892	2,250	45.17%	2,442	49.03%	289	5.80%
1896	2,690	49.60%	2,714	50.05%	19	0.35%
1900	2,737	49.20%	2,732	49.11%	94	1.69%
1904	2,850	52.29%	2,457	45.08%	143	2.62%
1908	2,660	47.65%	2,749	49.25%	173	3.10%
1912	1,492	29.43%	2,431	47.95%	1,147	22.62%
1916	2,686	49.88%	2,549	47.34%	150	2.79%
1920	5,372	56.83%	3,976	42.07%	104	1.10%
1924	4,694	49.02%	4,257	44.45%	625	6.53%
1928	5,059	53.39%	4,387	46.30%	30	0.32%
1932	4,240	40.97%	5,987	57.86%	121	1.17%
1936	4,919	45.98%	5,546	51.84%	233	2.18%
1940	6,061	55.44%	4,834	44.21%	38	0.35%
1944	5,642	59.12%	3,835	40.18%	67	0.70%
1948	5,313	53.34%	4,574	45.92%	74	0.74%
1952	6,650	62.00%	4,031	37.59%	44	0.41%
1956	6,577	61.85%	4,026	37.86%	30	0.28%
1960	6,053	55.95%	4,730	43.72%	35	0.32%
1964	4,587	43.47%	5,933	56.23%	32	0.30%
1968	5,389	51.82%	3,787	36.42%	1,223	11.76%
1972	6,594	64.45%	3,601	35.20%	36	0.35%
1976	5,293	52.11%	4,792	47.18%	72	0.71%
1980	5,770	56.39%	4,022	39.30%	441	4.31%
1984	7,143	67.99%	3,336	31.75%	27	0.26%
1988	6,414	63.81%	3,605	35.87%	32	0.32%
1992	5,033	46.02%	3,480	31.82%	2,424	22.16%
1996	5,303	49.67%	4,097	38.38%	1,276	11.95%
2000	6,988	65.46%	3,498	32.77%	189	1.77%
2004	8,224	69.49%	3,510	29.66%	100	0.85%
2008	7,794	63.71%	4,187	34.22%	253	2.07%
2012	7,484	67.94%	3,241	29.42%	290	2.63%
2016	9,806	75.81%	2,471	19.10%	658	5.09%
2020	11,261	78.79%	2,774	19.41%	257	1.80%
2024	11,526	80.01%	2,682	18.62%	197	1.37%

== Demographics ==
Historical population
Census	Pop.	Note	%±
1820	1,822		—
1830	3,989		118.9%
1840	10,392		160.5%
1850	14,820		42.6%
1860	19,054		28.6%
1870	20,977		10.1%
1880	21,627		3.1%
1890	19,350		−10.5%
1900	19,881		2.7%
1910	19,452		−2.2%
1920	18,694		−3.9%
1930	18,078		−3.3%
1940	18,898		4.5%
1950	18,763		−0.7%
1960	20,641		10.0%
1970	21,138		2.4%
1980	24,398		15.4%
1990	24,616		0.9%
2000	26,523		7.7%
2010	28,818		8.7%
2020	28,995		0.6%
2025 (est.)	29,434	▲	1.5%
U.S. Decennial Census; 1790-1960 1900-1990; 1990-2000 2010

=== Racial and ethnic composition ===
Ripley County, Indiana – Racial and ethnic composition Note: the US Census treats Hispanic/Latino as an ethnic category. This table excludes Latinos from the racial categories and assigns them to a separate category. Hispanics/Latinos may be of any race.
Race / Ethnicity (NH = Non-Hispanic)	Pop 1980	Pop 1990	Pop 2000	Pop 2010	Pop 2020	% 1980	% 1990	% 2000	% 2010	% 2020
Mixed race or Multiracial (NH)	x	x	105	222	887	x	x	0.40%	0.77%	3.06%
Native Hawaiian or Pacific Islander alone (NH)	x	x	0	3	0	x	x	0.00%	0.01%	0.00%
Asian alone (NH)	46	37	95	146	183	0.19%	0.15%	0.36%	0.51%	0.63%
Black or African American alone (NH)	7	16	13	67	73	0.03%	0.06%	0.05%	0.23%	0.25%
Hispanic or Latino (any race)	113	62	247	445	541	0.46%	0.25%	0.93%	1.54%	1.87%
Native American or Alaska Native alone (NH)	17	44	90	37	45	0.07%	0.18%	0.34%	0.13%	0.16%
Other race alone (NH)	13	4	2	19	53	0.05%	0.02%	0.01%	0.07%	0.18%
Total	24,398	24,616	26,523	28,818	28,995	100.00%	100.00%	100.00%	100.00%	100.00%
White alone (NH)	24,202	24,453	25,971	27,879	27,213	99.20%	99.34%	97.92%	96.74%	93.85%

=== 2020 Census ===
As of the 2020 census, the county had a population of 28,995. The median age was 42.0 years. 23.1% of residents were under the age of 18 and 19.6% of residents were 65 years of age or older. For every 100 females there were 98.7 males, and for every 100 females age 18 and over there were 95.3 males age 18 and over.

The racial makeup of the county was 94.3% White, 0.3% Black or African American, 0.2% American Indian and Alaska Native, 0.6% Asian, <0.1% Native Hawaiian and Pacific Islander, 0.8% from some other race, and 3.7% from two or more races. Hispanic or Latino residents of any race comprised 1.9% of the population.

18.6% of residents lived in urban areas, while 81.4% lived in rural areas.

There were 11,374 households in the county, of which 30.4% had children under the age of 18 living in them. Of all households, 52.5% were married-couple households, 16.6% were households with a male householder and no spouse or partner present, and 23.0% were households with a female householder and no spouse or partner present. About 26.3% of all households were made up of individuals and 13.0% had someone living alone who was 65 years of age or older.

There were 12,259 housing units, of which 7.2% were vacant. Among occupied housing units, 74.8% were owner-occupied and 25.2% were renter-occupied. The homeowner vacancy rate was 0.9% and the rental vacancy rate was 7.8%.

=== 2010 Census ===
As of the 2010 United States census, there were 28,818 people, 10,789 households, and 7,910 families residing in the county. The population density was 64.6 inhabitants per square mile (24.9/km^{2}). There were 11,952 housing units at an average density of 26.8 per square mile (10.3/km^{2}). The racial makeup of the county was 97.6% white, 0.5% Asian, 0.2% American Indian, 0.2% black or African American, 0.5% from other races, and 0.9% from two or more races. Those of Hispanic or Latino origin made up 1.5% of the population. In terms of ancestry, 43.4% were German, 14.2% were American, 13.9% were Irish, and 8.7% were English.

Of the 10,789 households, 36.2% had children under the age of 18 living with them, 58.1% were married couples living together, 10.2% had a female householder with no husband present, 26.7% were non-families, and 22.8% of all households were made up of individuals. The average household size was 2.63 and the average family size was 3.08. The median age was 39.2 years.

The median income for a household in the county was $47,697 and the median income for a family was $57,305. Males had a median income of $41,711 versus $31,927 for females. The per capita income for the county was $22,025. About 7.5% of families and 9.8% of the population were below the poverty line, including 14.3% of those under age 18 and 8.6% of those age 65 or over.

== Education ==
School districts include:

- Batesville Community School Corporation
- Jac-Cen-Del Community School Corporation
- Milan Community Schools
- South Ripley Community School Corporation
- Sunman-Dearborn Community School Corporation

== See also ==
- Ripley County website
- Ripley County in Indiana portal
- List of counties in Indiana
- National Register of Historic Places listings in Ripley County, Indiana
