= Belen =

Belen, Belén or Beleń may refer to:

== Places ==
- Belén, the Spanish name for Bethlehem

=== Argentina ===
- Belén, Catamarca

=== Bolivia ===
- Belén (Aroma), La Paz Department, Bolivia
- Belén (Potosí), Bolivia

=== Colombia ===
- Belén, Boyacá
- Belén, Nariño
- Belén, Medellín, Antioquia.

=== Peru ===
- Belén District, Maynas
- Belén District, Sucre

=== Turkey ===
- Belen, Çanakkale
- Belen, Ezine
- Belen, Hani
- Belen, Hatay, a town and district of Hatay Province
- Belen, Kumluca, Antalya Province
- Belen, Kıbrıscık, Bolu Province
- Belen, Tarsus, Mersin Province
- Belen Pass

=== United States ===
- Belen, Mississippi
- Belen, New Mexico
  - Belen (Rail Runner station)

=== Elsewhere ===
- Belén, Chile
- Belén (canton), Heredia, Costa Rica
- Belén, Honduras
- Belén, Rivas, Nicaragua
- Belén River, Panama
- Belén, Paraguay
- Beleń, Poland
- Belén, Uruguay

== People ==
- Belen (given name), a list of people
- Ana Belén (born 1951), Spanish singer
- Marta Belen (1942–2005), American opera singer
- Mhicaela Belen (born 2002), Filipino volleyball player

== Schools ==
- Belen High School (Belen, New Mexico), United States
- Belen Jesuit Preparatory School, Miami, Florida, United States
- Instituto Técnico Militar, formerly Colegio de Belén, Havana, Cuba

== Other uses ==
- Belén (film), a 2025 Argentine drama film
- Belén, a traditional Christmas nativity scene common in the Philippines
- Belén Fraga, a fictional character in the Argentine telenovela Chiquititas
- A.D. Belén, a Costa Rican football club
- Belen point, a type of projectile point

== See also ==
- Belem (disambiguation)
- Bilen (disambiguation)
