= Bethlehem (disambiguation) =

Bethlehem is a Palestinian city in the central West Bank, identified as the birthplace of King David of Israel and Jesus of Nazareth.

Bethlehem may also refer to:

== Places ==
=== Ireland ===
- Bethlehem, County Westmeath, a townland in Kilkenny West civil parish

=== Israel ===
- Bethlehem of Galilee

=== Netherlands ===
- Bethlehem, Groningen

=== New Zealand ===
- Bethlehem, New Zealand, an area within the city of Tauranga

=== Palestine ===
- Bethlehem Governorate

=== South Africa ===
- Bethlehem, Free State

=== Switzerland ===
- Bethlehem, a quarter in the Bümpliz-Oberbottigen district of Berne

=== United Kingdom ===
- Bethlehem, Carmarthenshire
- Bethlehem, Pembrokeshire

=== United States ===
- Bethlehem, Connecticut
- Bethlehem, Florida
- Bethlehem, Georgia
- Bethlehem, Indiana
- Bethlehem, Kentucky
- Bethlehem, Louisiana
- Bethlehem, Maryland
- Bethlehem, Massachusetts, formerly a constituent part of Otis, Massachusetts
- Bethlehem, Mississippi
- Bethlehem, New Hampshire, a town
  - Bethlehem (CDP), New Hampshire, a census-designated place within the town
- Bethlehem, New York
- Bethlehem, Alexander County, North Carolina
- Bethlehem, Ohio, an unincorporated community in Richland County
- Bethlehem, Marion County, Ohio, a ghost town
- Bethlehem, Pennsylvania
  - Episcopal Diocese of Bethlehem (former jurisdiction of the Episcopal Church)
- Bethlehem, Tennessee
- Bethlehem, West Virginia, in Ohio County
- Bethlehem, Harrison County, West Virginia

== Music ==
- Bethlehem (German band), a German extreme metal band, or their 1992 demo album
- Bethlehem (Christian band), a 1970s American band
- Bethlehem Records, a defunct American jazz record label
- Bethlehem (Brian McKnight album), 1998
- Bethlehem (The Original Sins album) or the title song, 1996
- Bethlehem, an album by Kari Jobe, 2007
- "Bethlehem", a song by Declan McKenna from What Do You Think About the Car?, 2017
- "Bethlehem", a song from the 1996 musical Martin Guerre by Claude-Michel Schönberg
- "Bethlehem", a song from the 2021 EP Preacher's Kid by Semler

== Other uses ==
- Bethlehem (2013 film), an Israeli film
- Bethlehem, Mountain Ash a demolished Calvinistic Methodist chapel in Mountain Ash, Glamorgan, Wales
- Bethlehem Chapel, a chapel in Prague
- Bethlehem Steel, an American steel-producer
- Bethlehem Shipbuilding Corporation, former subsidiary of Bethlehem Steel
- Bethlehem, a meteorite fall of 1859 in Bethlehem, New York, United States
- Bethlehem, another name for nativity scene

== See also ==
- Belem (disambiguation)
- Belen (disambiguation)
- Bethlehem Old Work, U.S. Virgin Islands
- Bethlehem Township (disambiguation), various townships in the United States
- Bethlem Royal Hospital, a mental institution near London that became the source of the English word bedlam
