= Potosí =

City in Bolivia

- City & Municipality
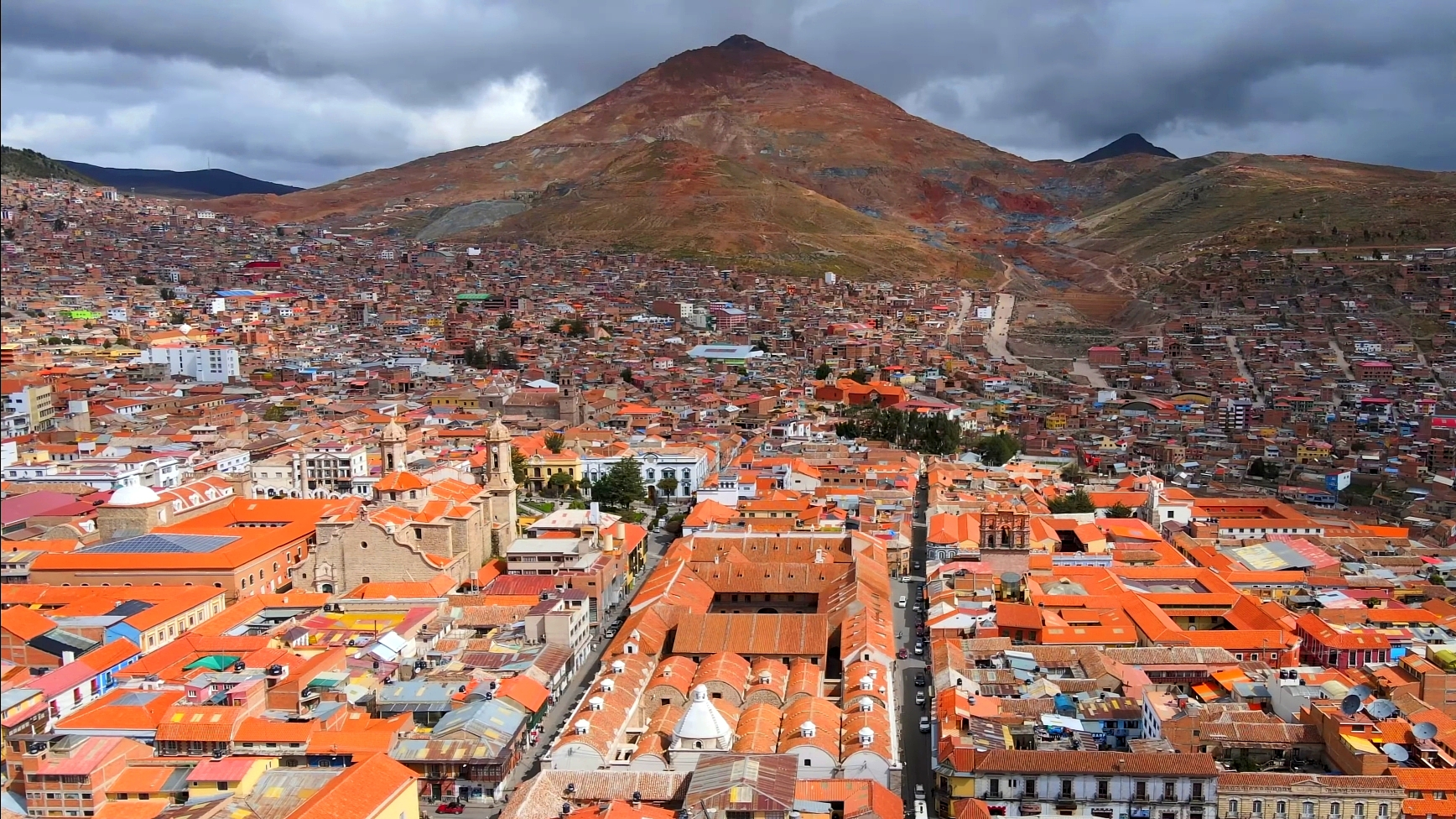
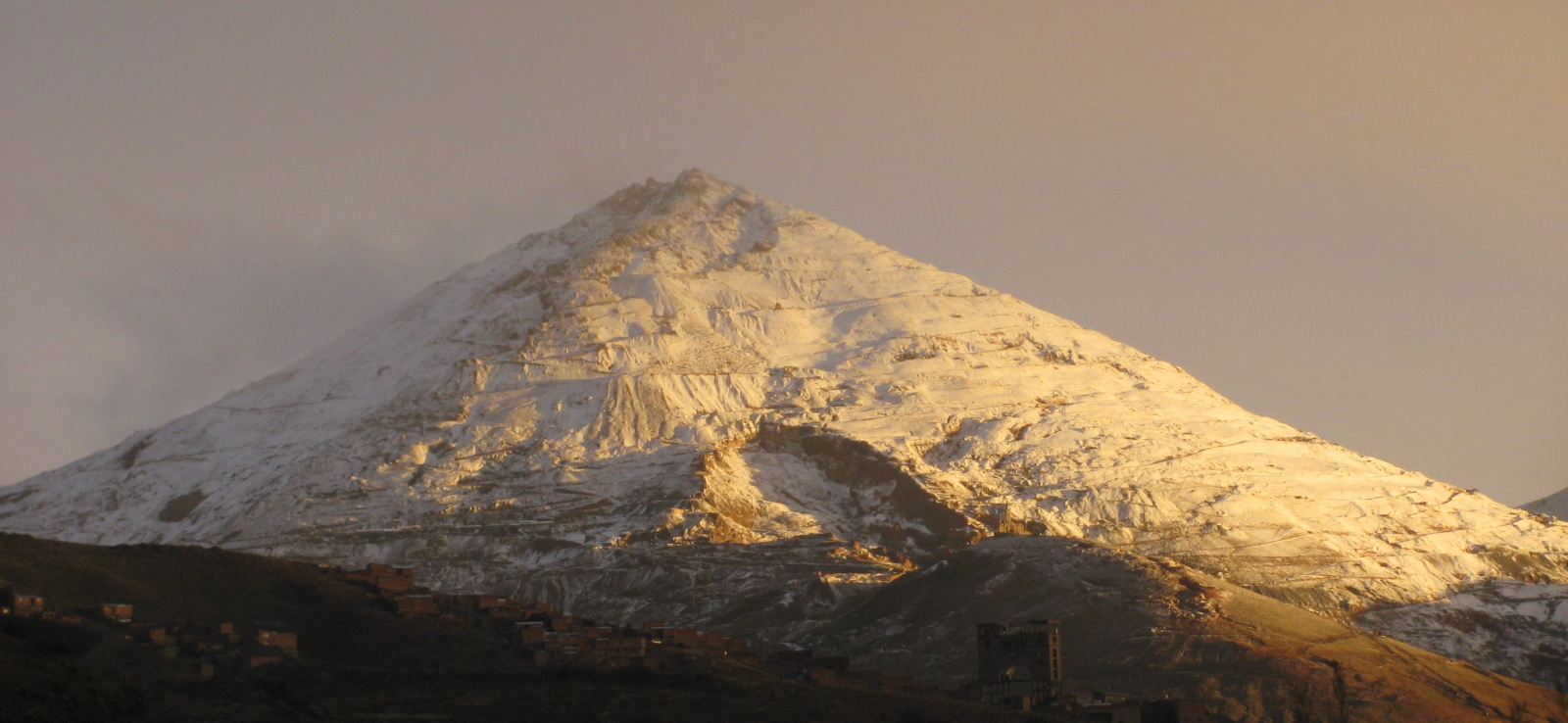
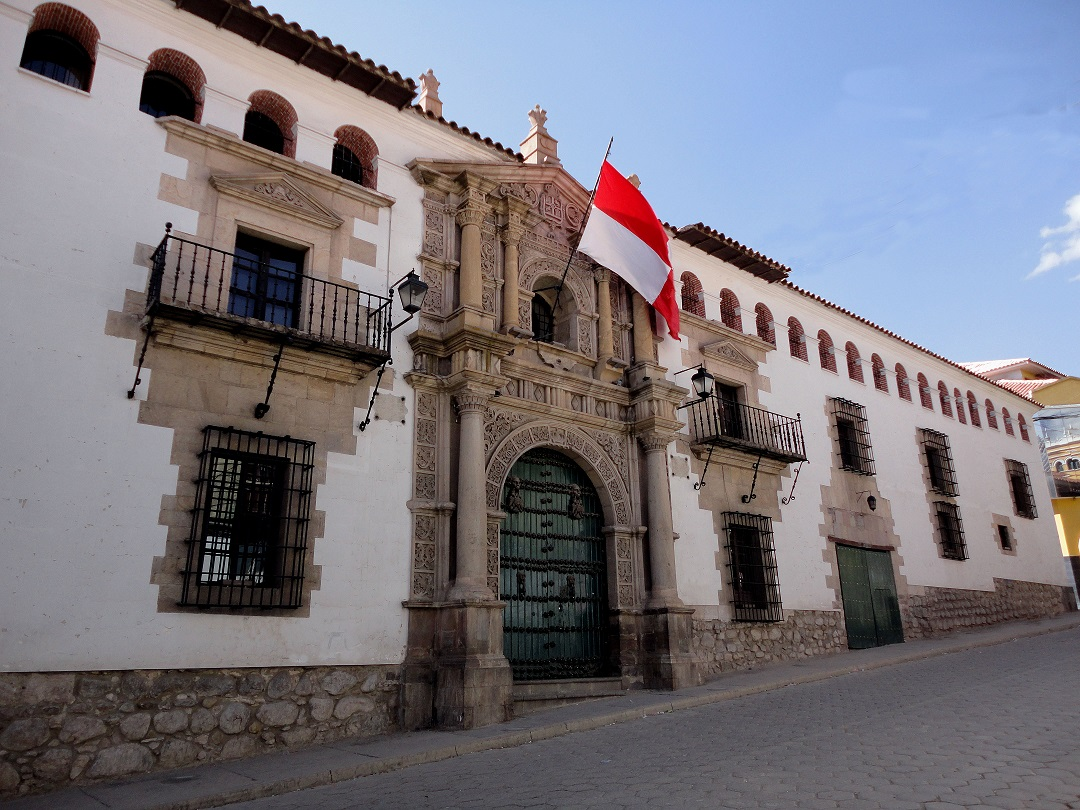
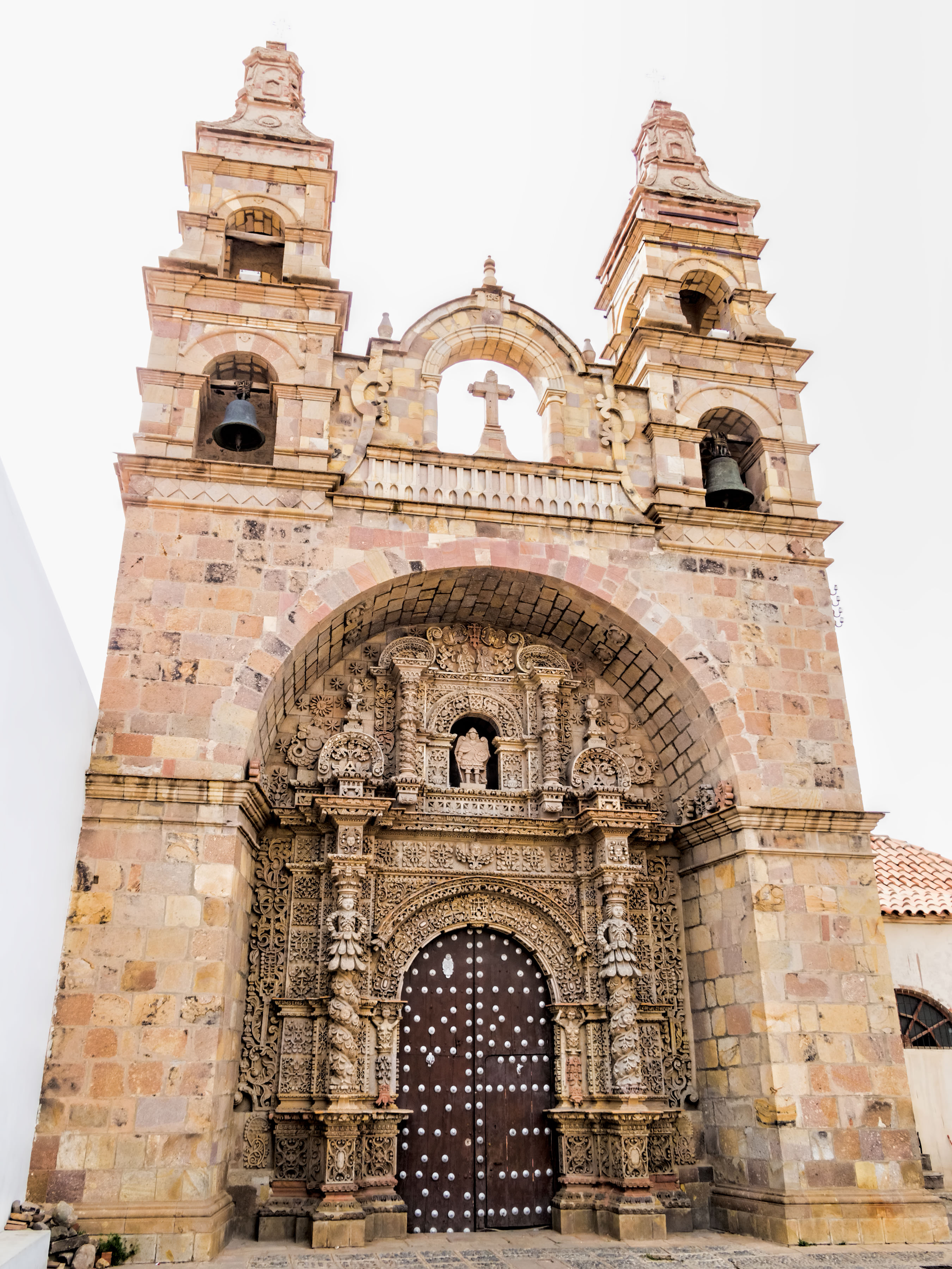
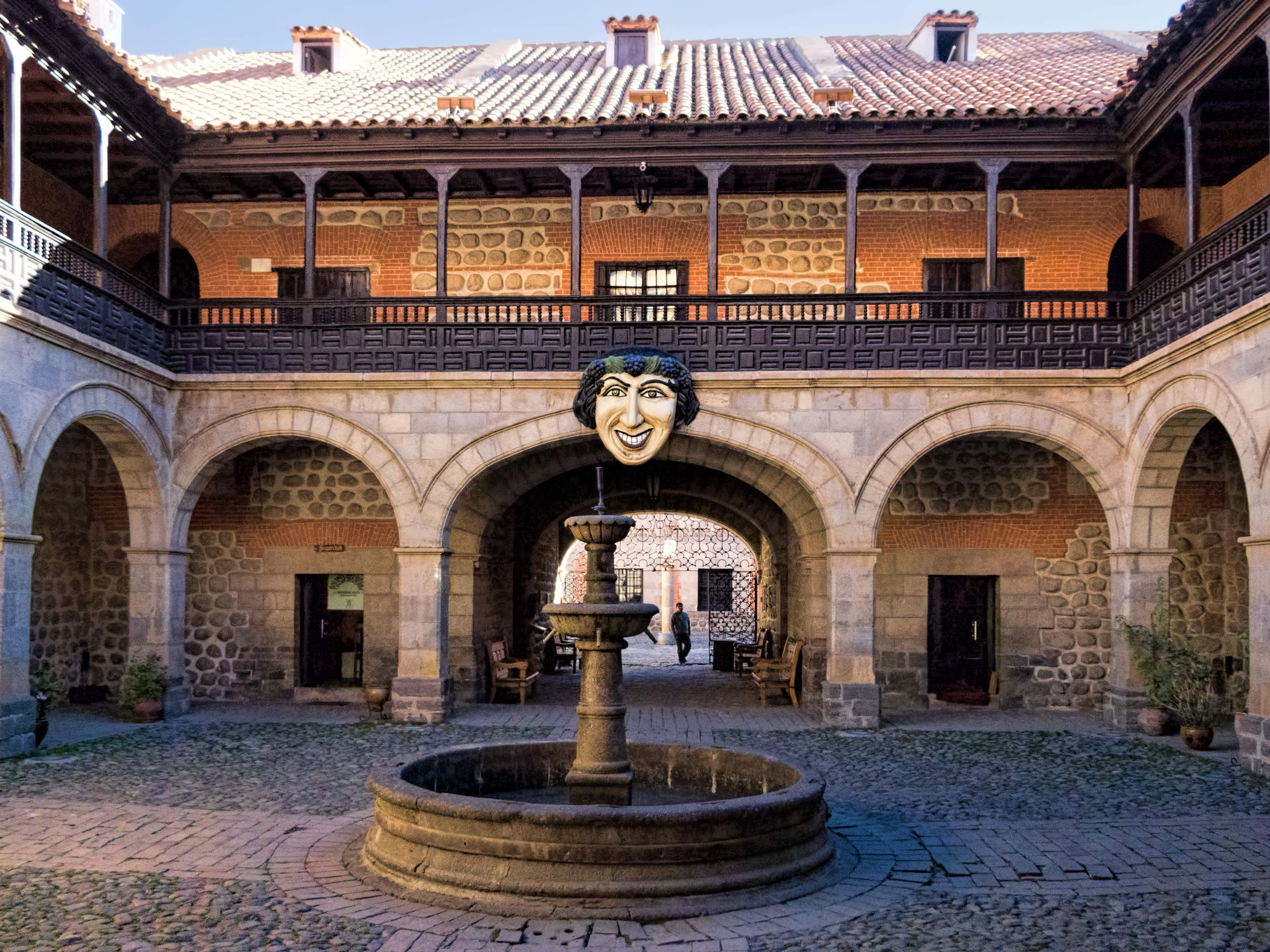
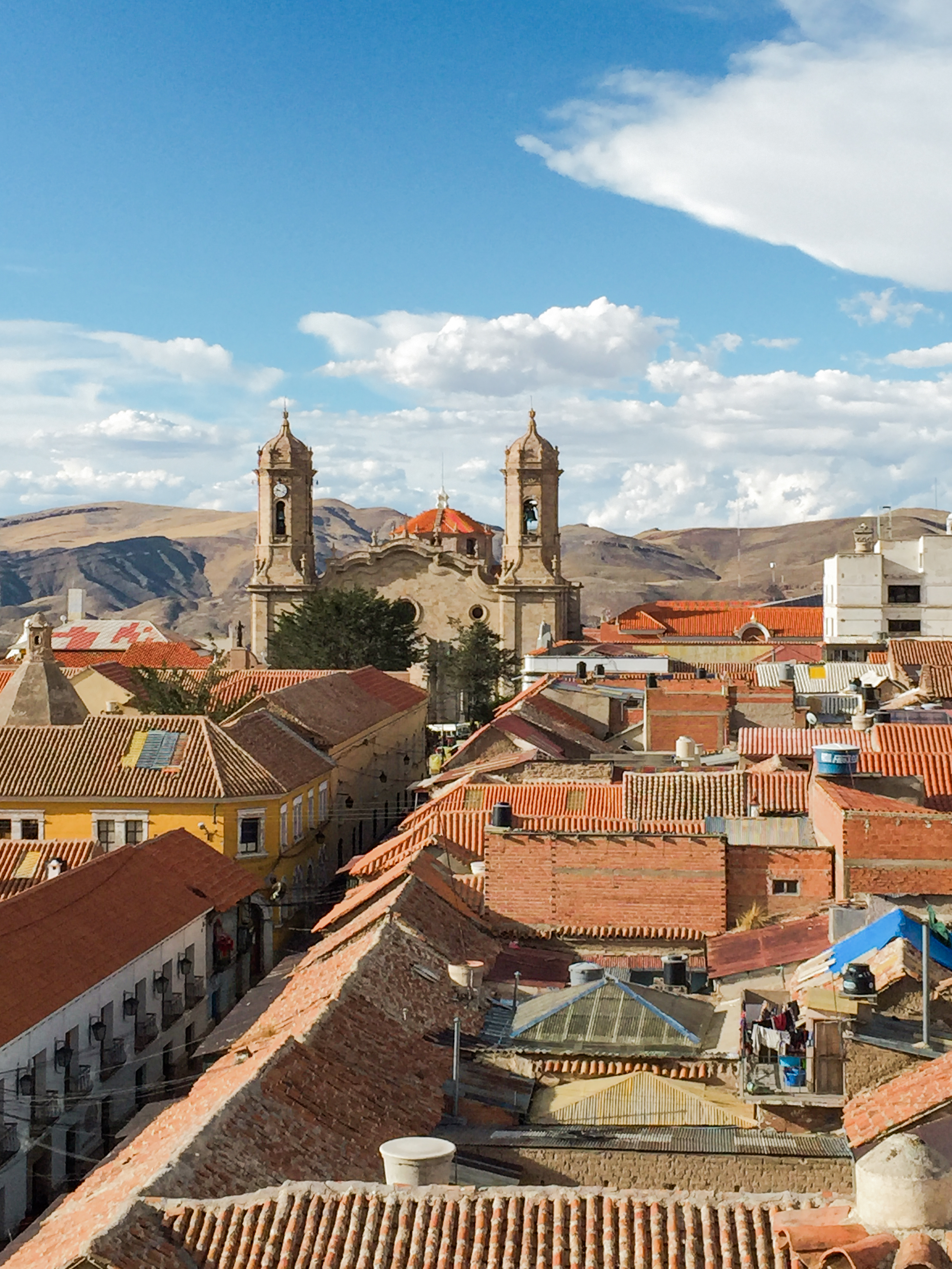
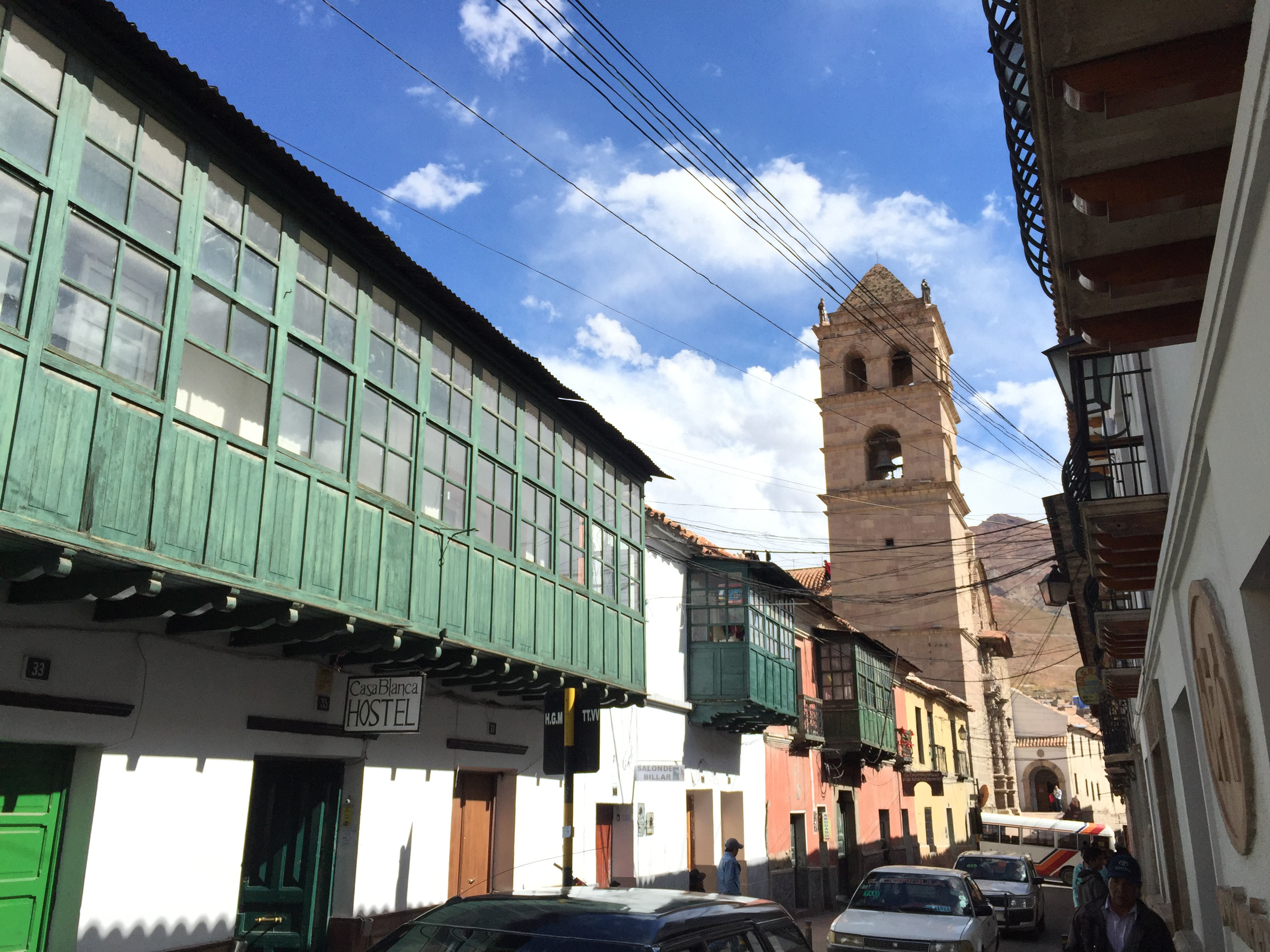
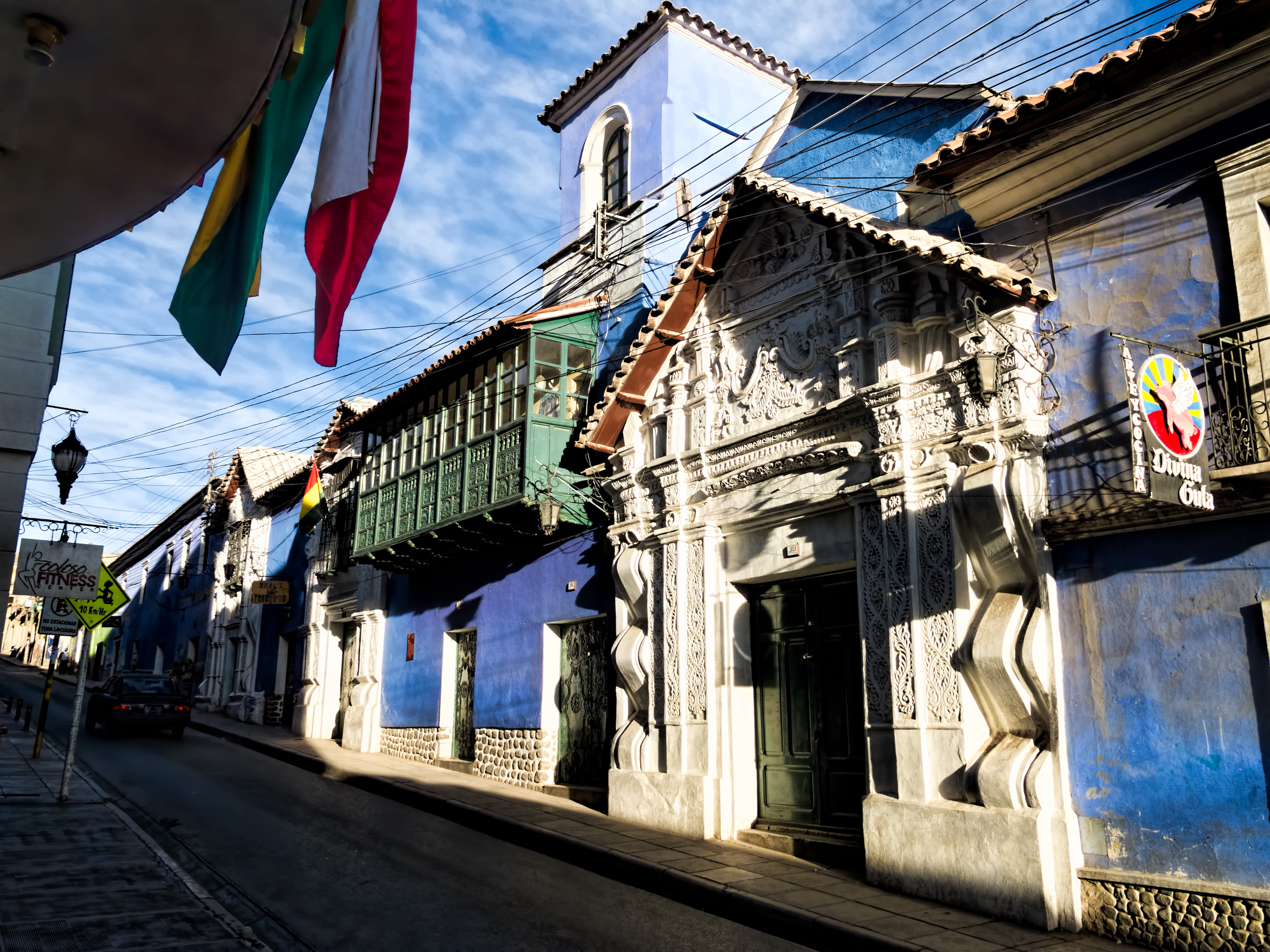
- Aerial view of Potosí Cerro Rico of Potosí House of the Coin Church of San Lorenzo National Mint of Bolivia View of the Cathedral Main street of Potosí Spanish colonial architecture

- Flag Coat of arms
- Nickname: Villa Imperial
- Location in Bolivia Potosí (South America)
- Coordinates: 19°35′21″S 65°45′12″W
- Country: Bolivia
- Department: Potosí
- Province: Tomás Frías
- Municipality: Potosí Municipality
- Founded: April 1, 1545
- Founder: Diego de Huallpa

Government
  - Mayor: Jhonny Llally (MPC)

Area
  - City & Municipality: 118.218 km^{2} (45.644 sq mi)
- Elevation: 4,067 m (13,343 ft)

Population (2021 estimate)
  - Urban: 267,907
  - Urban density: 6,000/km^{2} (16,000/sq mi)
  - Metro: 354,771
- Time zone: UTC−4
- Website: www.potosi.bo

UNESCO World Heritage Site
- Official name: City of Potosí
- Type: Cultural
- Criteria: ii, iv, vi
- Designated: 1987 (11th session)
- Reference no.: 420
- Region: Latin America and the Caribbean
- Endangered: 2014–present

Potosí, known as Villa Imperial de Potosí in the colonial period, is the capital city and a municipality of the Department of Potosí in Bolivia. It is one of the highest cities in the world at a nominal 4,067 m (13,343 ft). Diego Huallpa, an indigenous prospector, is traditionally credited with the discovery of the Cerro Rico in 1545, which led to the founding and rapid growth of Potosí due to its extraordinary silver wealth.

For centuries, it was the location of the Spanish colonial silver mint. A considerable amount of the city's colonial architecture has been preserved in the historic center of the city, which—along with the globally important Cerro Rico de Potosí—are part of a designated UNESCO World Heritage Site.

Potosí lies at the foot of the Cerro de Potosí—sometimes referred to as the Cerro Rico ("rich mountain")—a mountain popularly conceived of as being "made of" silver ore that dominates the city. The Cerro Rico is the reason for Potosí's historical importance since it was the major supply of silver for the Spanish Empire until Guanajuato in Mexico surpassed it in the 18th century. At the turn of the 16th/17th centuries, it was the second largest city in the world, after London.

The silver was taken by llama and mule train to the Pacific coast, shipped north to Panama City, and carried by mule train across the isthmus of Panama to Nombre de Dios or Portobelo, whence it was taken to Spain on the Spanish treasure fleets. Some of the silver also made its way east to Buenos Aires, via the Rio de la Plata, or to Acapulco, Mexico, where it was sent via the Manila Galleons to buy Asian products. Cerro de Potosí's peak is 4,824 m (15,827 ft) above sea level.

Today, Potosí continues to be an important mining center, and is the largest urban center in the Department of Potosí. A growing city, Potosí is now famous for its well-preserved colonial architecture, and unusual geographic setting as one of the highest cities in the world. It features a rare cold highland climate, and is marked by its long dry period, and short but strong wet season. While famous for its dominance as a mining center in early Spanish colonial history, Potosí still sits at one of the largest silver deposit systems in the world.

== Etymology ==
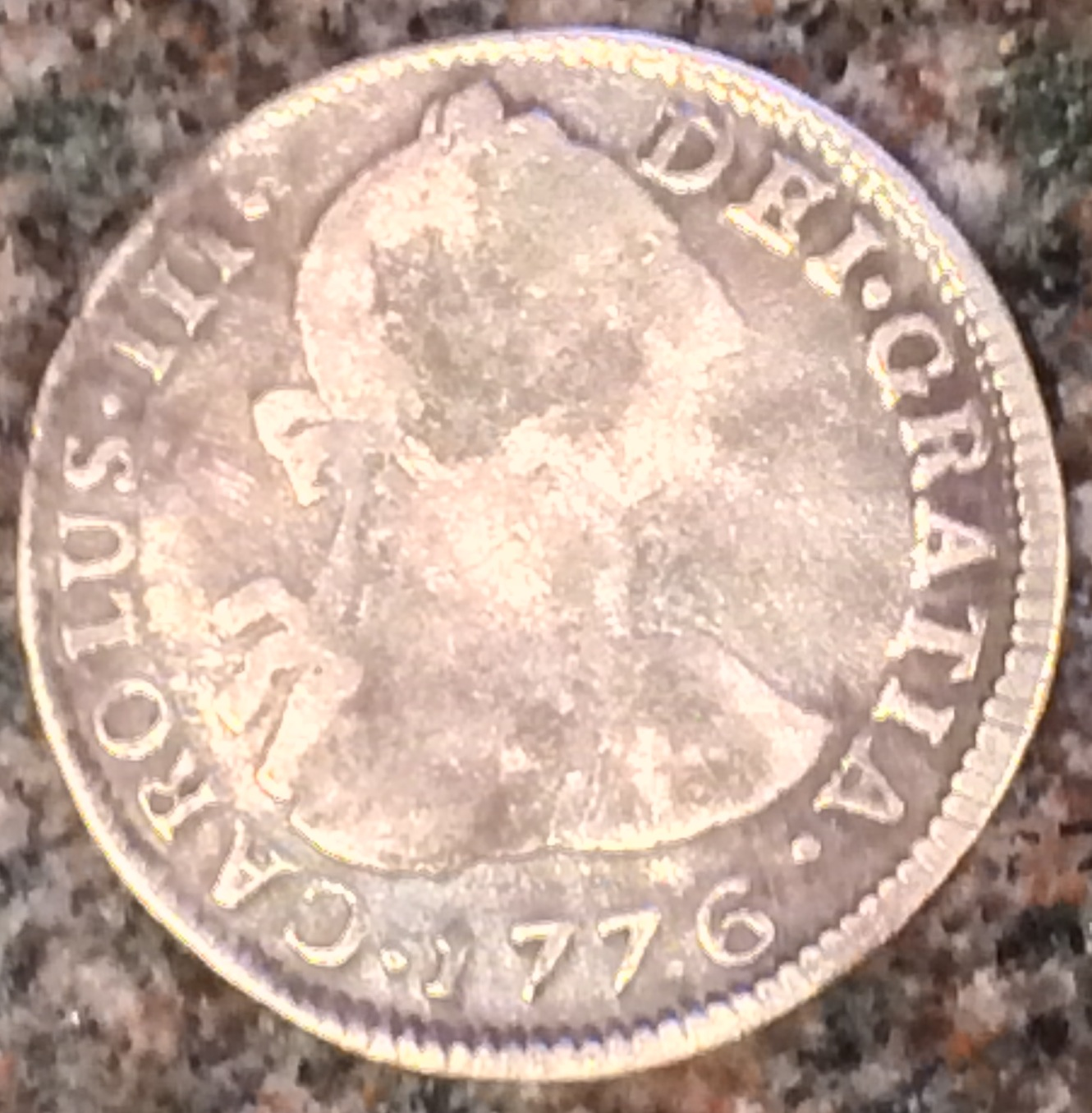
A Spanish colonial two-reales piece ("two bits") from the Potosí Mint

There is no authoritative etymology for the word Potosí. According to legend, in about 1462, Huayna Capac, the eleventh Sapa Inca of what by then was known as the Inca Empire "set out for Ccolque Porco and Andaccaua, the location of his mines from which were taken innumerable arrobas of silver" (an arroba is a Spanish unit of weight equivalent to approximately 25 lb (11 kg)). Before leaving there, he saw Potosí, and admiring its beauty and grandeur, he said (speaking to those of his Court):

"This doubtless must have much silver in its heart"; whereby he subsequently ordered his vassals to go to Ccolque Porco ... and work the mines and remove from them all the rich metal. They did so, and having brought their tools of flint and reinforced wood, they climbed the hill; and after having probed for its veins, they were about to open those veins when they heard a frightening thunderous noise which shook the whole hill, and after this, they heard a voice which said: "Do not take the silver from this hill, because it is destined for other masters." Amazed at hearing this reasoning, the Incan vassals desisted in their purpose and returned to Porco and told the king what had happened; relating the occurrence in their own language, on coming to the word noise, they said "Potocsí" which means there was a great thunderous noise, and from that later was derived (corrupting a letter) the name of Potosí.

It is believed that Potosí is a Quechua word. However, in Quechua the root p'otoj does not refer to a thunderous noise, whereas it does in Aymara. Thus, if Potosí encompasses the idea of a thunderous noise, the location would have an Aymaran root rather than a Quechuan.

The actual sharp structure of the term is contrary to the nature of both Aymara and Quechua. Another explanation, given by several Quechua speakers, is that potoq is an onomatopoeic word that reproduces the sound of the hammer against the ore, and oral tradition has it that the town derived its name from this word.

== History ==
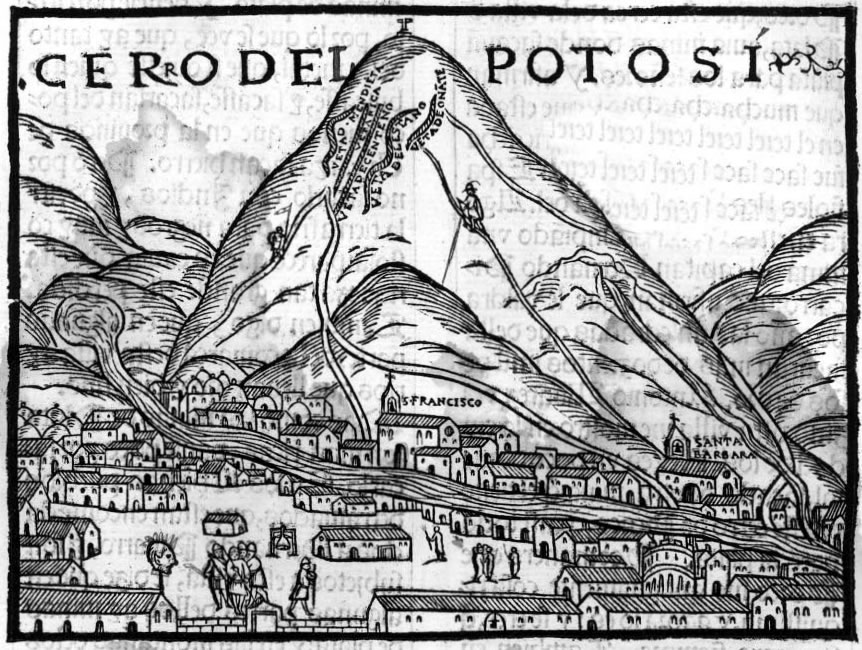
Cerro Rico del Potosí, the first image of Potosi in Europe. Pedro Cieza de León, 1553

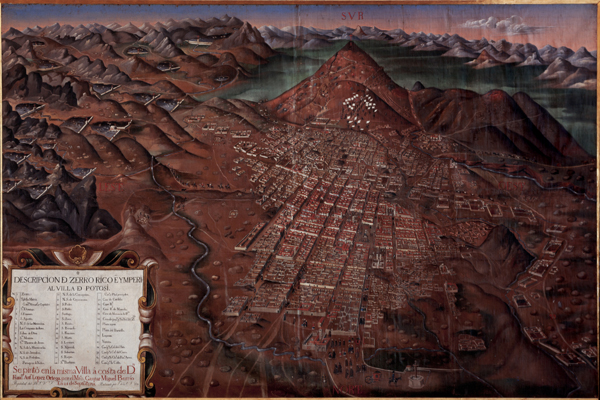
Description of the Rich and Imperial Villa of Potosí in 1758 by Gaspar Miguel de Berrío. Museum of Charcas.

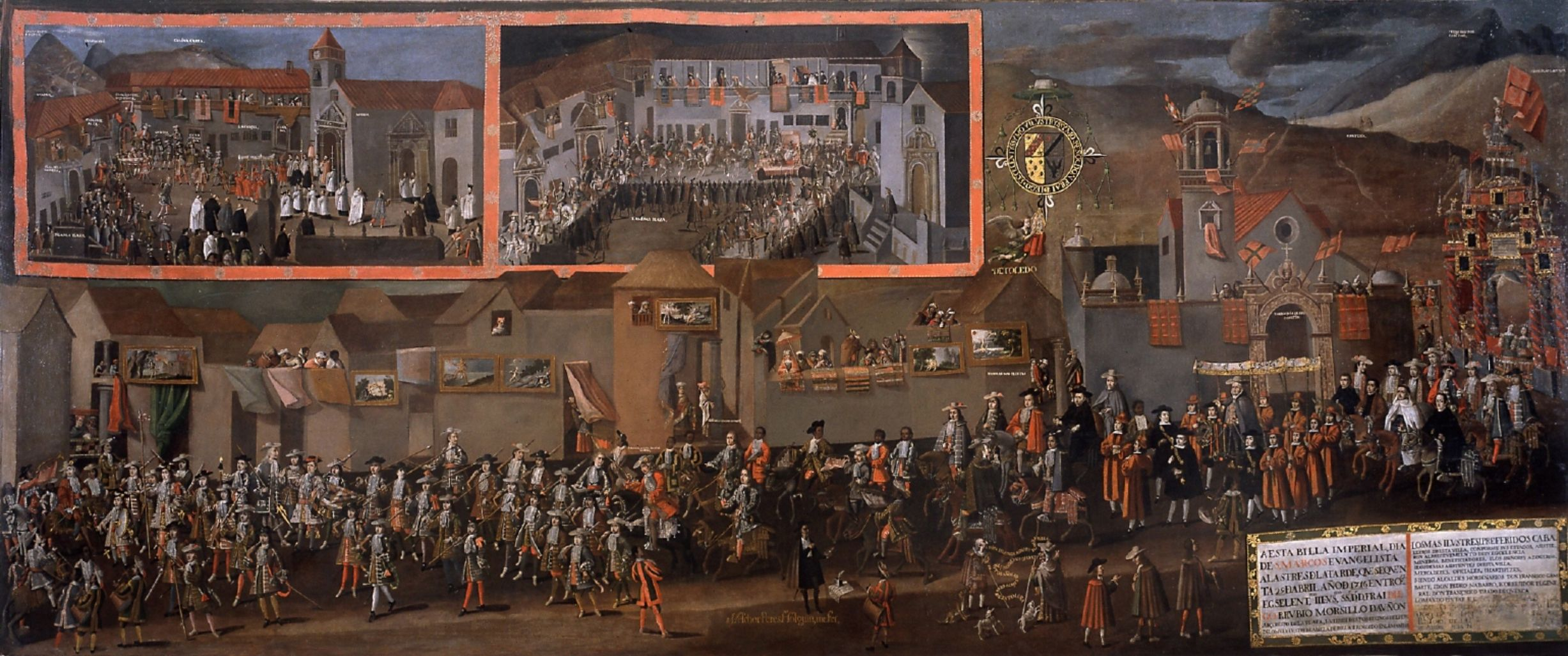
Entrance of Archbishop Viceroy Morcillo in Potosí by Melchor Pérez de Holguín, 1716. Painting located at Museo of the Americas (Spain).

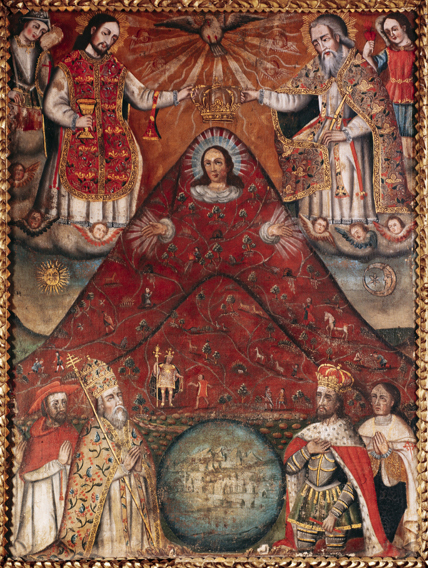
'The Virgin of the Cerro of Potosí, 18th century painting, in the National Mint of Bolivia.

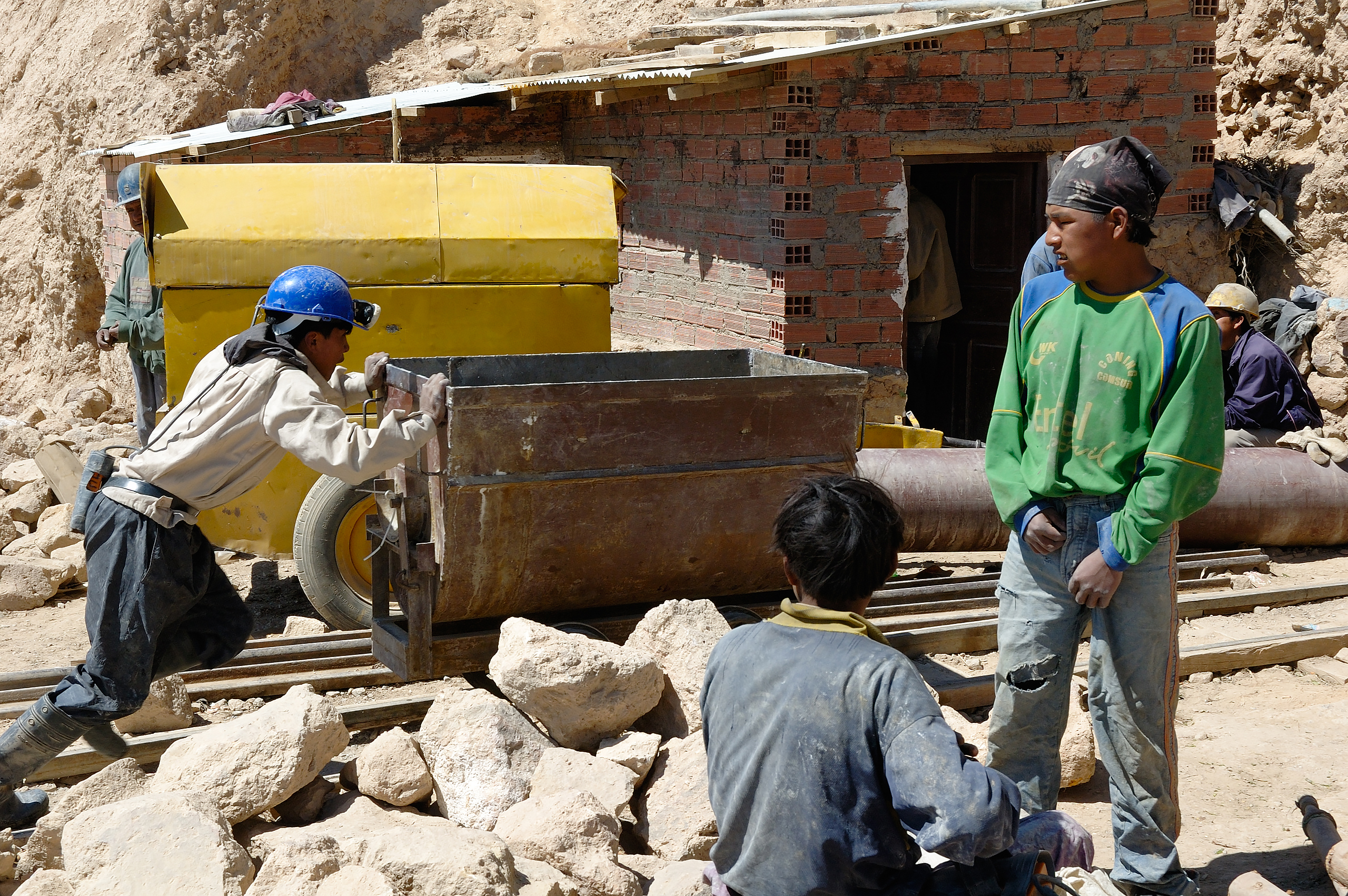
Miners at work

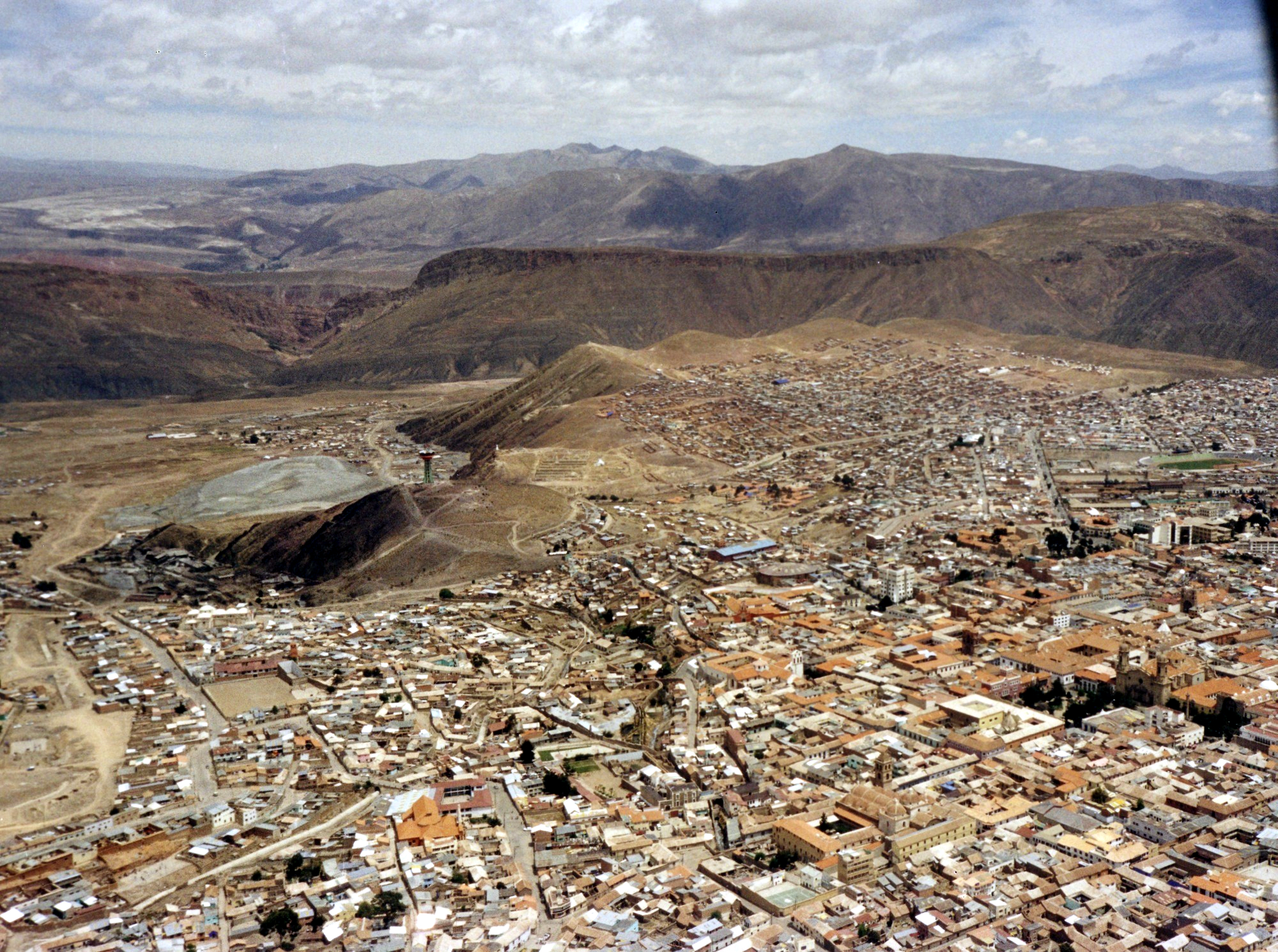
Potosí, aerial photo

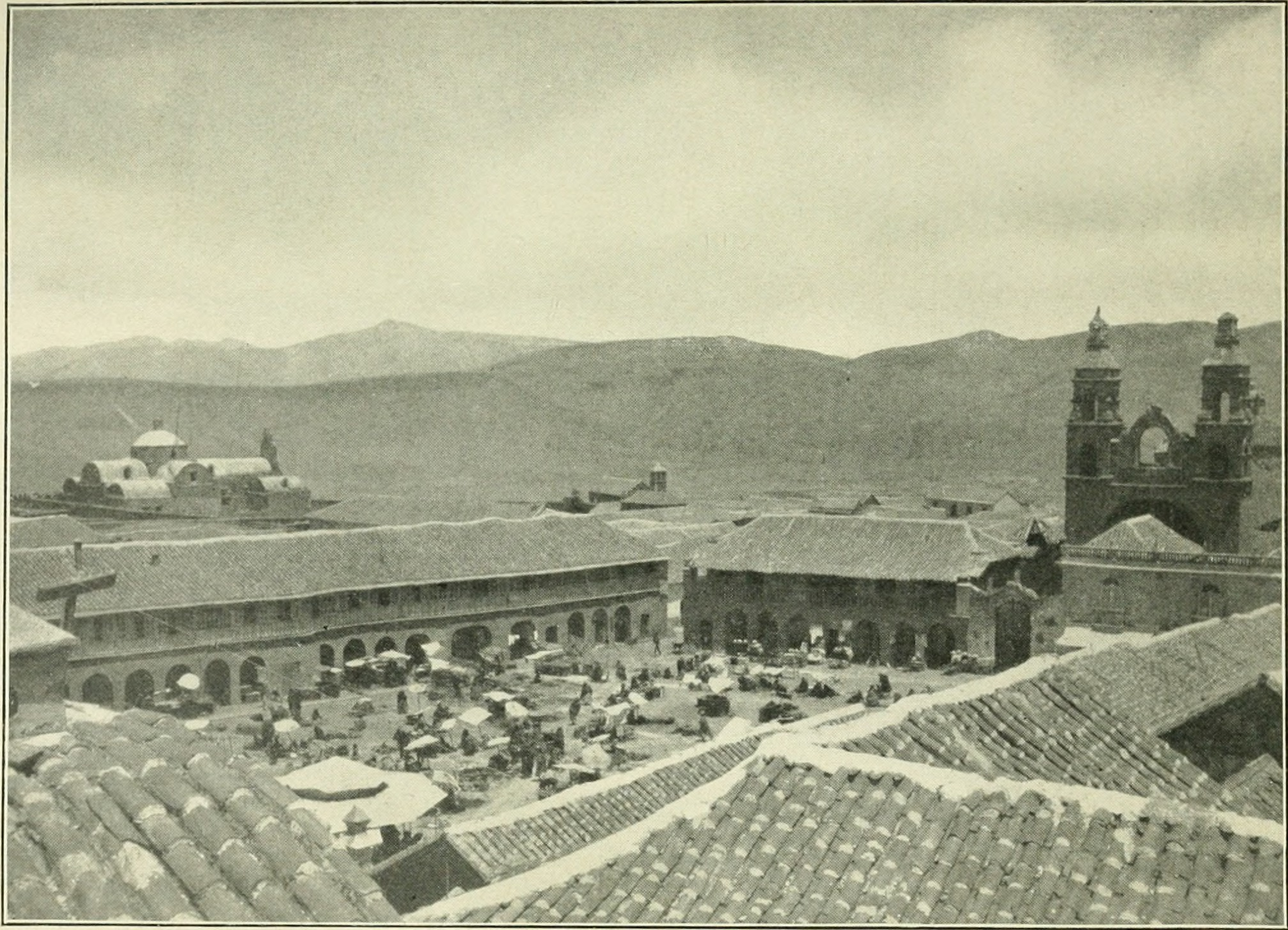
City of Potosí and the Church of San Lorenzo de Carangas at background, 1911, by U.S. Senator Hiram Bingham III.

=== Colonial silver boom ===
Founded in 1545 as a mining town, it soon produced fabulous wealth, and the population eventually exceeded 200,000 people. The city gave rise to a Spanish expression, still in use: valer un Potosí ("to be worth a Potosí"), meaning "to be of great value". The rich mountain, Cerro Rico, produced an estimated 60% of all silver mined in the world during the second half of the 16th century.

Potosí miners at first mined the rich oxidized ores with native silver and silver chloride (cerargyrite) that could be fed directly into smelting furnaces. Especially successful were the small clay "flower pot" furnaces called guayras, which had been used by the Incas. By 1565, the miners had exhausted the direct-smelting ore, and silver production plummeted. Silver production was revived by the introduction of the patio process, invented by Spanish merchant Bartolomé de Medina in 1554. The patio process used mercury amalgamation to extract silver from lower-grade ores, and those containing silver sulfide (argentite), as was typical of the unoxidized ores found deeper in the mountain. In 1609, another mercury amalgamation method, the pan amalgamation process was invented in Potosí, and proved better-adapted to the conditions at Potosí.

Spanish American mines were the world's most abundant sources of silver during this time period. Spanish America's ability to supply a great amount of silver and China's strong demand for this commodity which the Spanish supplied via Latin American trade with the Philippines using the Manila Galleons, resulted in a spectacular mining boom. The true champion of this boom in the silver industry was indeed the Spanish crown. By allowing private-sector entrepreneurs to operate mines under license and placing high taxes on mining profits, the Spanish empire was able to extract the greatest benefits. An example of a tax that was levied includes the quinto, a 20% severance tax on gross value. From the raw materials extracted from the mines, coins called pieces of eight were fashioned at the Potosí mint.

For Europeans, Peru–Bolivia was located in the Viceroyalty of Peru and was known as "Upper Peru" before becoming independent as part of Bolivia. Potosí was a mythical land of riches, it is mentioned in Miguel de Cervantes' famous novel, Don Quixote (second part, chap. LXXI) as a land of "extraordinary richness". One theory holds that the mint mark of Potosí (the letters "PTSI" superimposed on one another) is the origin of the dollar sign.

The urban complex in the remote Andes was important enough to be designated a Villa Imperial in the hierarchy of Spanish urban settlements. Although in mountainous terrain, the core of Potosí was laid out in the standard Spanish grid pattern, while the rancherias (Indigenous settlements on the northern flank of the Cerro Rico) were more haphazard. According to an anonymous description of the city, by 1603 some 6,000 Spaniards and other Europeans, 5,000 Africans, an unspecified number of people of mixed heritage and at least 120,000 native Andeans were resident in Potosi. The villa was governed by a Spanish corregidor, 2 Alcaldes and a town council of 19 men. At this time, it was the second largest city in the world, after London.

In addition to five publicly employed scribes, some forty independent notaries documented and recorded commercial transactions as well as last wills and testaments. Since Potosí was of such economic importance to the Spanish Empire, the crown bureaucracy was a significant presence. Large churches, lavishly decorated inside, were built, and friars from the Dominican, Franciscans, Augustinians, Mercederians, and Jesuits were present, but no convent for women existed until 1650. There was an ecclesiastical court for legal issues regarding the clergy. The Inquisition had no tribunal in the city, but relied on a commissioner.

=== Labor ===
Indigenous laborers were required to work in Potosí's silver mines through the Spanish mita system of forced labor, based on an analogous mit'a system traditional to pre-Hispanic Andean society (though the mit'a directed labor for public works and collective agricultural projects). Laborers were drawn from the native population of an area that encompassed almost 200,000 square miles. Thirteen thousand men were conscripted each year, constituting about one out of every seven adult males in the indigenous population. These mitayos faced harsh conditions in the mines, where they were often given the least desirable jobs. While more skilled laborers extracted the ore, mitayos were tasked with carrying it back to the surface in baskets, leather bags, or cloth sacks.

These loads often weighed between 100 and 300 lbs, and the workers had to carry them up rickety ladders in steep, narrow shafts lit only by a candle tied to their foreheads. Many of them died or were seriously injured due to falls, accidents, and the harsh conditions of the mine life. Illness was another danger: at such a high altitude, pneumonia was always a concern, especially given the extreme and rapid changes of temperature experienced by workers climbing from the heat of the deep shafts to the freezing elements of the surface at 16,000 feet, and mercury poisoning took the lives of many involved in the refining process.

The Potosí mita caused dramatic demographic shifts in the local indigenous population as wives and children moved with workers to Potosí while thousands more fled their traditional villages, forfeiting their ayllu land rights in order to escape the labor draft. In rough terms the area affected by these displacements went from Quito to Buenos Aires. By the late 17th century, upper Peru had lost nearly 50% of its indigenous population compared to a little over a century earlier. This only increased the burden on the remaining natives, and at some point in the 1600s, up to half of the eligible male population might find themselves working at Potosí. Nevertheless, the number of mitayos dropped to about 4,000 by 1689, prompting the Viceroy Duke of Palata to raise the number again through a new census and inclusion of new populations not subject to the mita (forasteros). It is suspected that Spanish authorities in Arica, Chuquisaca and Oruro may not have responded to calls by Potosí authorities to locate escapees since many of these had proved useful workforce in agricultural haciendas of influential Spaniards.

The reform failed, and the Duke's successor set the official number to 4,108 mitayos (1,367 active each week). In reality, the number of mitayos was even lower due to the increasing practice of buying oneself out of the obligation. For the remaining mita workforce, however, conditions remained harsh. Mine and mill owners notoriously ignored official regulations on provisions and especially withheld the money the Indians should receive as recompensation for their travel. Just the cost of traveling to Potosí and back could be more than a mitayo was paid in a year, and so many of them chose to remain in Potosí as wage workers when their mita was finished. Former mitayos living in Potosí were not only exempt from the draft, but usually earned considerably more due to the valuable skills they had gained in permanent services.

According to historian Noble David Cook, "A key factor in understanding the impact of the Potosi mita on the Indians is that mita labor was only one form of work at the mines. A 1603 report stated that of 58,800 Indians working at Potosi, 5100 were mitayos, or fewer than one in ten. In addition to the mitayos there were 10,500 mingas (contractual workers) and 43,200 free wage earners." However, historian Peter Bakewell emphasizes the role of mita labor in Potosí to a greater extent. According to his research, though as few as 4500 mitayos were actively laboring in the mines at any given time, this was due to the mita ordinaria system, in which the up to 13,500 men conscripted per year were divided into three parts, each working one out of every three weeks. In addition, many of the remaining mingas and wage workers were either mita ordinaria workers on their off weeks or former mitayos who remained in Potosí.

Within the mines, a figure called el Tío acts as a deity of the land itself. El Tío serves as a figure of the mountain itself. Laborers within the mines offer coca leaves and alcohol to statues constructed within the mines of the deity to protect themselves from the dangerous conditions.

=== Colonial-era society ===
Potosí was a multiracial society, with native Andeans, Spanish settlers, and black slaves. The largest sector of the population were native men, forced to labor underground mining the silver ore, but there were considerable opportunities for merchants and native traders, who became wealthy. Suppliers of food as well as holders of urban and rural real estate prospered in Potosí. Women, particularly widows, held property, since they were guaranteed a portion of their husband's estate under Spanish law. Small-scale female vendors dominated street markets and stalls, selling food, coca leaves, and chicha (maize beer). A portion of the female population were sex workers, who worked in brothels, many of which were annexed to gambling dens.

In the early 17th century, Basques were well established in the city and made up for a substantial number of the inhabitants in Potosí. They gathered in a confederation opposed to another one, the Vicuñas, a melting pot of natives and non-Basque Spanish and Portuguese colonists, fighting for control over ore extraction from the mines and its management. Eventually, tension among both factions came to a head, resulting in the eruption of overt armed conflict starting 1622 up to 1625. The Spanish Crown intervened, siding at one point with the Basques. Both factions reached a settlement sealed with a wedding between the son and daughter of the leaders in either side, the Basque Francisco Oyanume and the Vicuña general Castillo. One of the most famous Basque residents in Potosí (1617–19) was Catalina de Erauso, a nun who escaped her convent and dressed as a man, becoming a driver of llamas and a soldier.

=== Independence era ===
During the Bolivian War of Independence (1809–1825), Potosí frequently passed between the control of Royalist and Patriot forces. Major leadership mistakes came when the First Auxiliary Army arrived from Buenos Aires (under the command of Juan José Castelli), which led to an increased sense that Potosí required its own independent government.

Later, the Second Auxiliary Army (under the command of Manuel Belgrano) was forced to retreat, Belgrano made the decision to blow up the Casa de la Moneda. The natives undid the fuse, as many refused to evacuate and would have lost their lives. Two more expeditions from Buenos Aires would seize Potosí.

=== Modern era ===
Potosí continues to be an important administrative center, mining town, tourist attraction, and population center in modern Bolivia. The Potosí Silversmithing School was established in 2011 as part of an industrialization effort.

== Geography ==
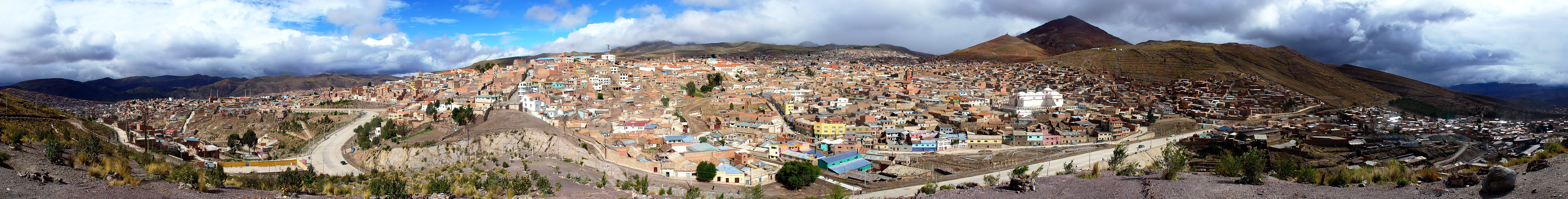
Potosí with Cerro Rico in the background.

=== Geology ===
Located in the Bolivian tin belt, Cerro Rico de Potosí is the world's largest silver deposit and has been mined since the sixteenth century, producing up to 60,000 tonnes by 1996. Estimates are that much silver still remains in the mines. Potosí became the second largest city, and the site of the first mint, in the Americas. By 1891, low silver prices prompted the change to mining tin, which continued until 1985. At peak production in the sixteenth and seventeenth centuries, the ore contained up to 40% silver.

The ore deposits reside in veins present in the dacite volcanic dome. The hill is "honeycombed" with underground workings, reaching from the summit to depths of 1,150 m (3,770 ft). The conical hill has a reddish-brown gossan cap of iron-oxides and quartz, with grayish-blue altered dacite and many mine dumps below.

Basement rocks consist of Ordovician clastic sediments consisting of phyllite with some sandstone interbedding. At about 13.8 Ma, the dome was extruded. During the explosive process, the Venus breccia formed when the ascending dacite magma reacted with groundwater to produce a phreatic eruption. The released pressure allowed the formation of the Caracoles tuff ring on top of the breccia. The magma then extruded outward from a dike to form a volcanic dome over the tuff. The dacite dome is 1,700 m (5,600 ft) by 1,200 m (3,900 ft) at the surface and narrows down to the 100 m (330 ft) wide dike at depth. Hydrothermal circulation and fracturing soon followed, altering the dacite and depositing ore minerals and gangue in the veins.

=== Climate ===
Potosí features a cold subtropical highland climate (Köppen: Cwc, Trewartha: Eolk). Summers are cool and wet, with daily highs rarely rising above 20 °C (68 °F). Winters have cooler days with much colder nights, averaging −4 °C (25 °F). These low temperatures are a result of the extreme precipitation deficit during the winter months, with the resulting aridity leading to an increased diurnal temperature variation.

Climate data for Potosí, elevation 3,950 m (12,960 ft)
Month	Jan	Feb	Mar	Apr	May	Jun	Jul	Aug	Sep	Oct	Nov	Dec	Year
Record high °C (°F)	28.0 (82.4)	25.0 (77.0)	26.8 (80.2)	26.1 (79.0)	26.5 (79.7)	26.0 (78.8)	23.0 (73.4)	23.5 (74.3)	26.1 (79.0)	26.0 (78.8)	28.0 (82.4)	27.0 (80.6)	28.0 (82.4)
Mean daily maximum °C (°F)	17.1 (62.8)	16.9 (62.4)	17.5 (63.5)	17.9 (64.2)	16.8 (62.2)	15.4 (59.7)	14.8 (58.6)	16.2 (61.2)	17.2 (63.0)	18.6 (65.5)	18.9 (66.0)	18.2 (64.8)	17.1 (62.8)
Daily mean °C (°F)	10.8 (51.4)	10.5 (50.9)	10.6 (51.1)	9.7 (49.5)	7.7 (45.9)	6.1 (43.0)	5.8 (42.4)	7.1 (44.8)	8.5 (47.3)	10.3 (50.5)	11.1 (52.0)	11.1 (52.0)	9.1 (48.4)
Mean daily minimum °C (°F)	4.4 (39.9)	4.2 (39.6)	3.7 (38.7)	1.6 (34.9)	−1.4 (29.5)	−3.4 (25.9)	−3.3 (26.1)	−1.9 (28.6)	−0.2 (31.6)	2.0 (35.6)	3.3 (37.9)	4.0 (39.2)	1.1 (34.0)
Record low °C (°F)	−2.3 (27.9)	−3.1 (26.4)	−4.0 (24.8)	−7.1 (19.2)	−9.0 (15.8)	−10.6 (12.9)	−12.0 (10.4)	−9.5 (14.9)	−9.5 (14.9)	−6.0 (21.2)	−5.1 (22.8)	−4.8 (23.4)	−12.0 (10.4)
Average precipitation mm (inches)	105.1 (4.14)	93.0 (3.66)	58.1 (2.29)	14.7 (0.58)	2.8 (0.11)	1.5 (0.06)	1.1 (0.04)	3.5 (0.14)	10.9 (0.43)	22.5 (0.89)	38.8 (1.53)	78.1 (3.07)	430.1 (16.94)
Average precipitation days	18.2	16.0	12.8	4.8	0.8	0.4	0.5	1.1	2.4	5.3	8.6	14.3	85.2
Average relative humidity (%)	68.0	67.8	66.7	57.3	44.8	43.4	43.7	42.9	44.1	48.3	53.2	59.5	53.3
Source: Servicio Nacional de Meteorología e Hidrología de Bolivia

== Subdivisions ==
=== Neighborhoods ===
- Alto Potosí
- Cachi Rancho
- Cantumarca
- Cervecería
- Ciudad Satélite
- Concepción
- El Calvario
- Huachacalla
- La Chacra
- Las Delicias
- Las Lecherías
- Los Pinos-Cordepo
- Mercado Uyuni
- Nacional Potosí
- Nuevo Potosí
- Old Town
- Pailaviri
- Pampa Ingenio
- Plan 40
- San Benito
- San Clemente
- San Cristóbal
- San Gerardo
- San Juan
- San Martín
- San Pedro
- San Roque
- Villa Copacabana
- Villa España
- Villa Mecànicos
- Villa Nazaret
- Villa Venezuela

=== Villages ===
- Belén
- Cuchu Ingenio

== Sports ==
Potosí is home to football teams Real and Nacional, which play their matches at the 32,000-capacity multi-purpose stadium Estadio Víctor Agustín Ugarte, one of the highest stadiums in the world.

== Transportation ==
The city is served by Aeropuerto Capitán Nicolas Rojas, with commercial airline flights by Boliviana de Aviación, Bolivia's flag air carrier. There is also a railroad, the Rio Mulatos-Potosí line.

== Legacy ==
The city of San Luis Potosí in Mexico was named after Potosí in Bolivia. In the United States, the name Potosi was optimistically given to lead-mining towns of Potosi, Wisconsin, and Potosi, Missouri, and also to the silver-mining town of Potosi, Nevada.

== Twin towns – sister cities ==
- Cusco, Peru
- Lhasa, China

== Gallery ==
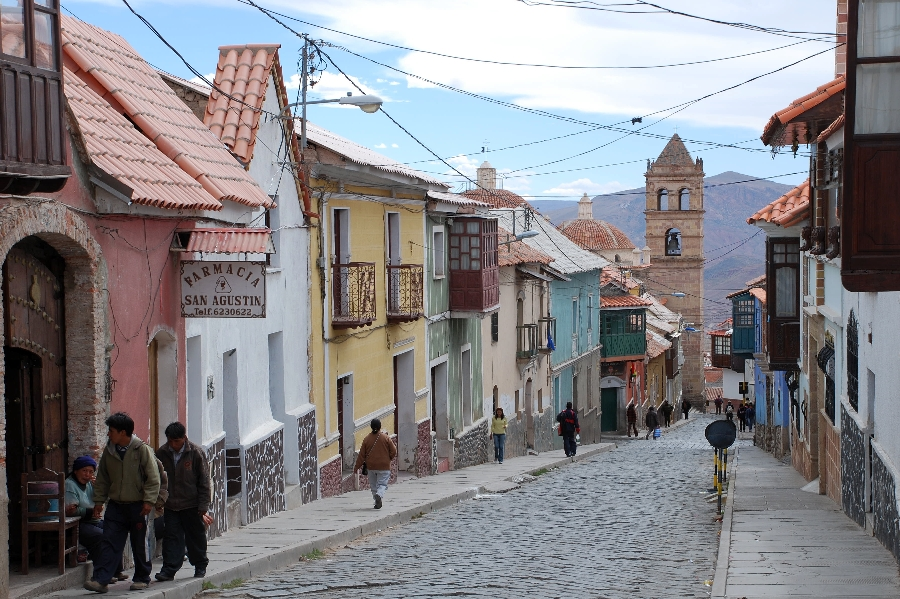
Central Potosí street

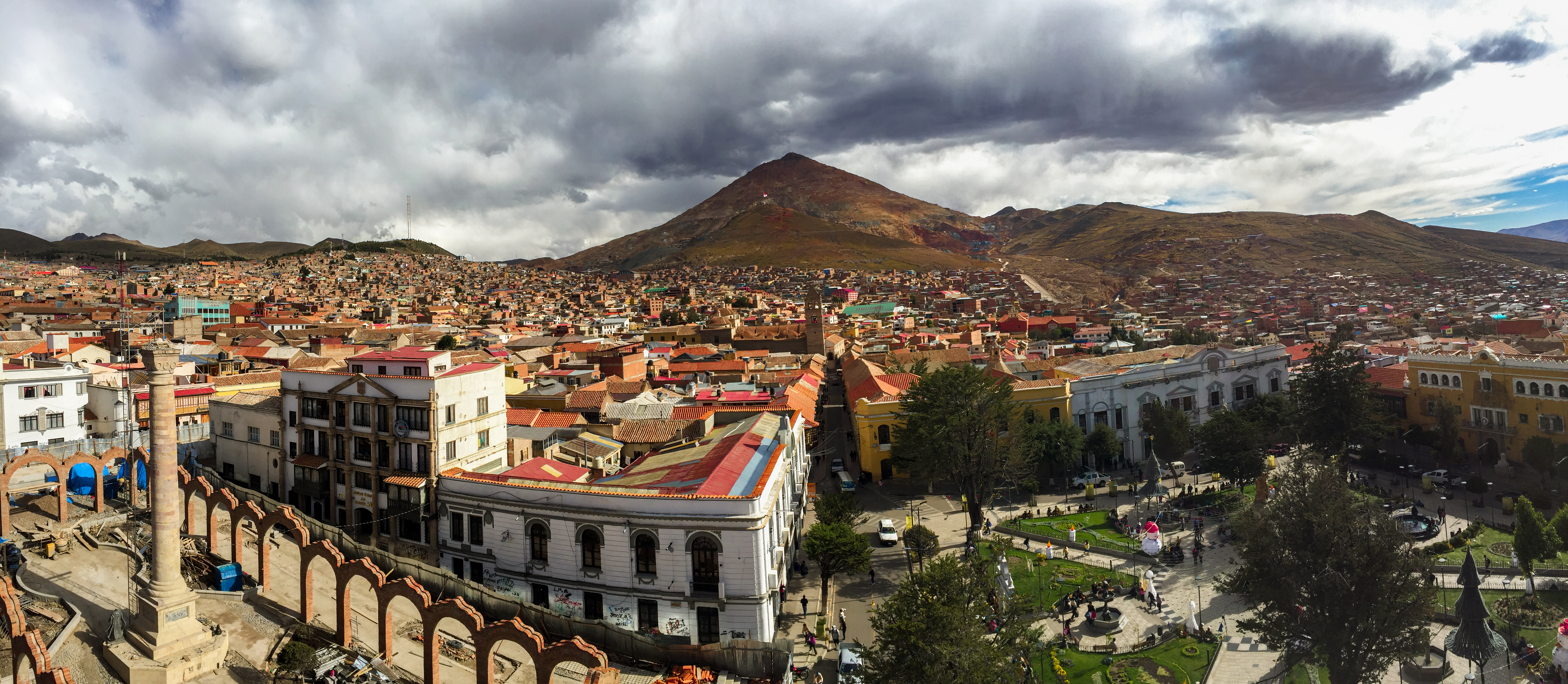
Panoramic of Potosí

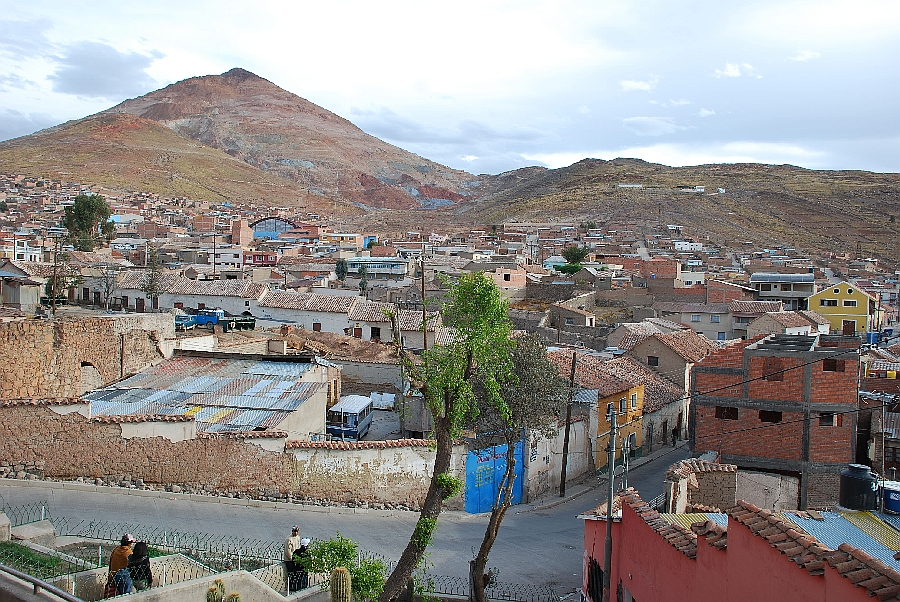
Potosí surface mining

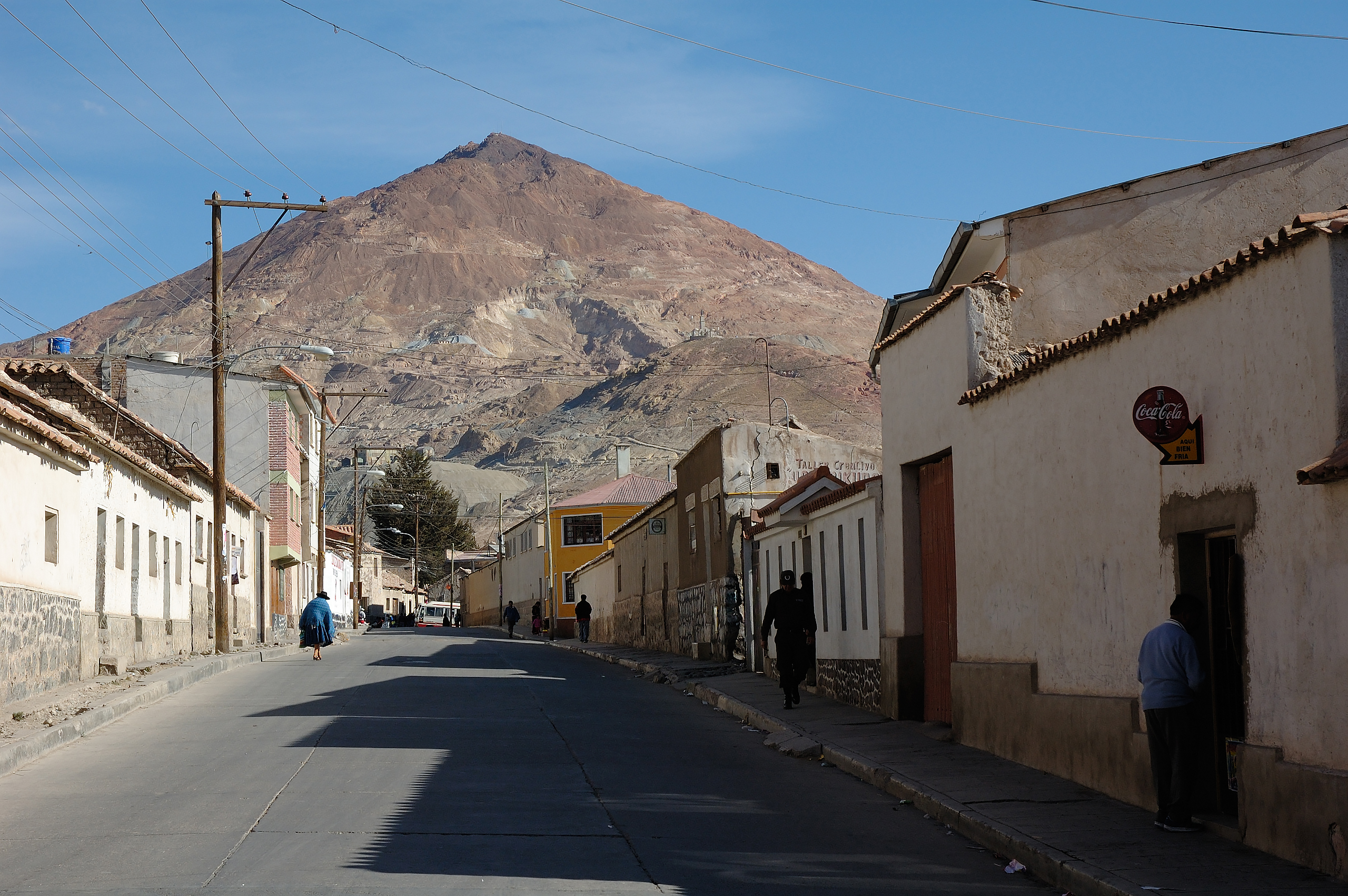
A street in Potosí with Cerro Rico in the background.

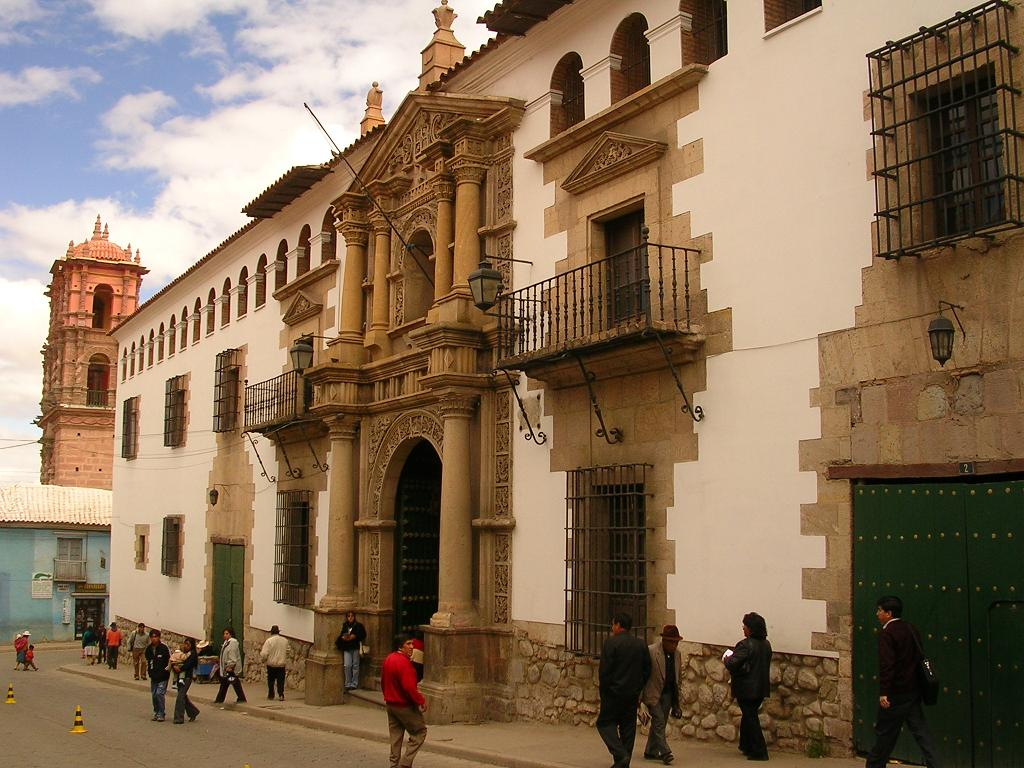
National Mint of Bolivia (former colonial Mint of Potosí)

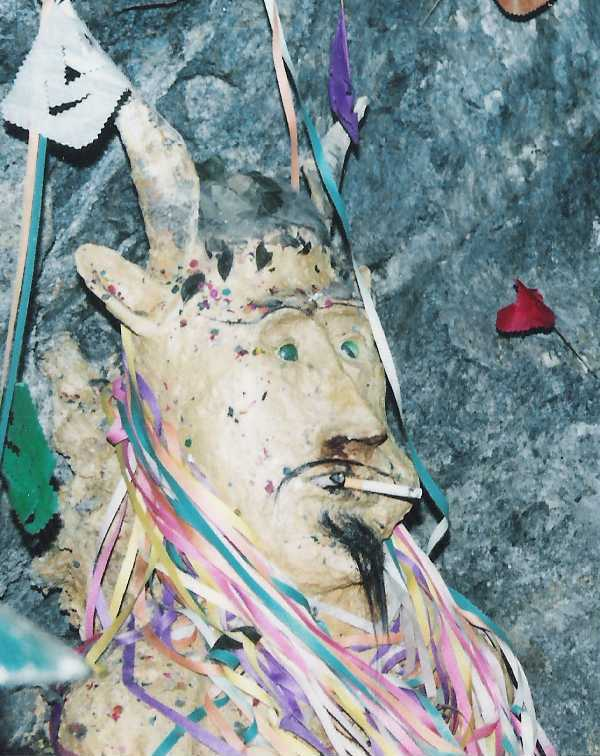
A figure of El Tío in Potosí mines, 1993

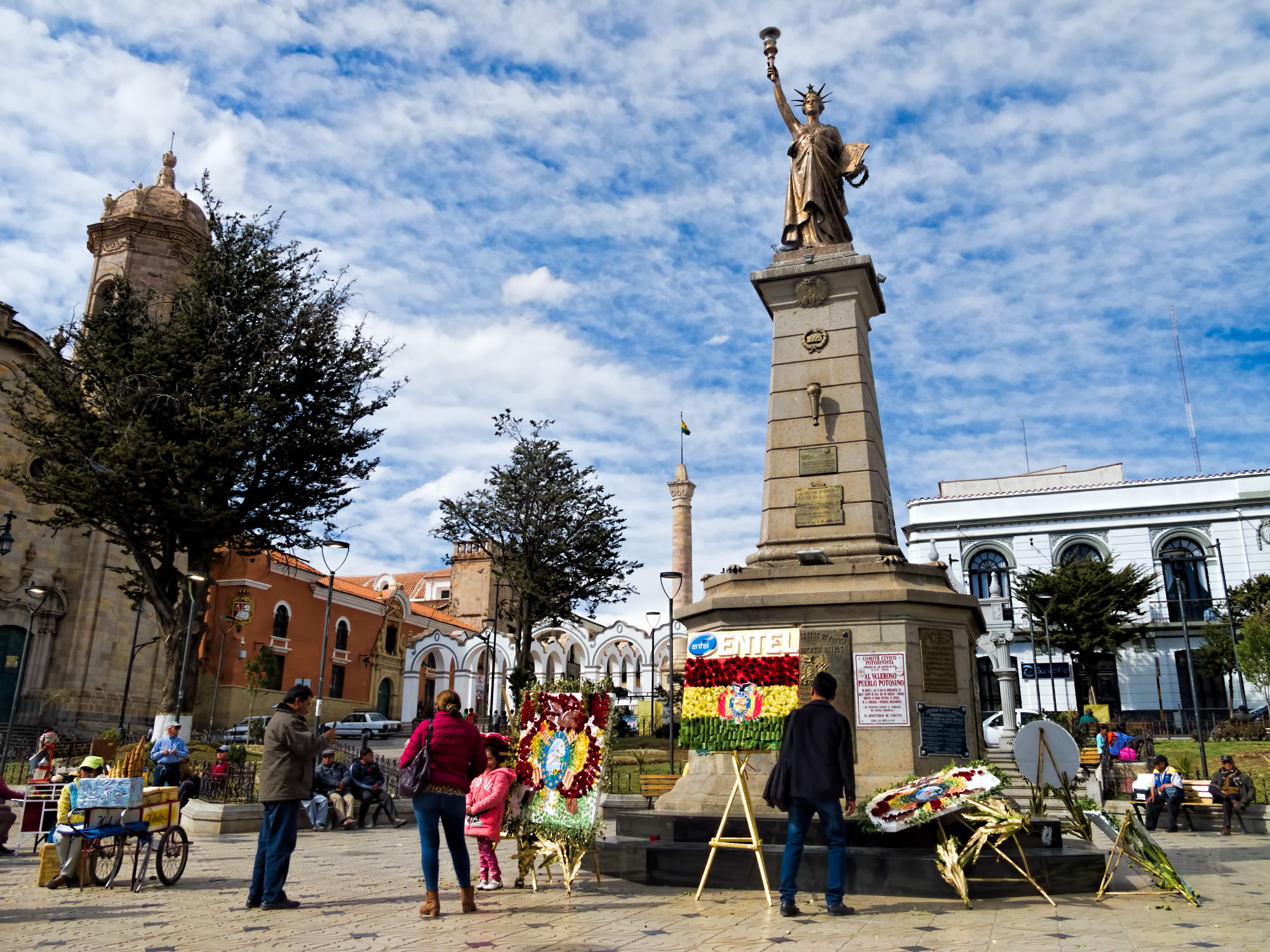
Downtown Potosí, Bolivia

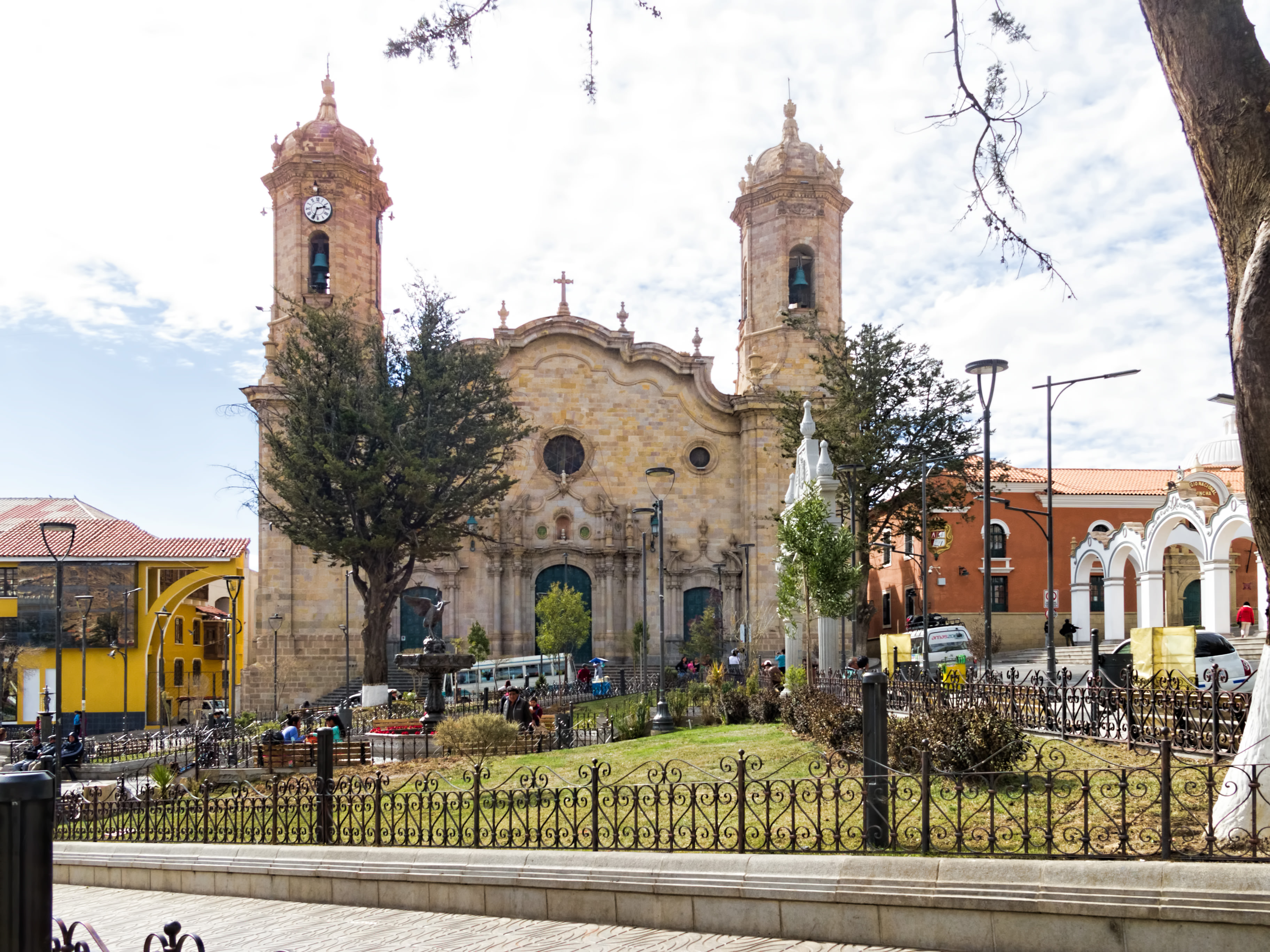
Potosí Cathedral

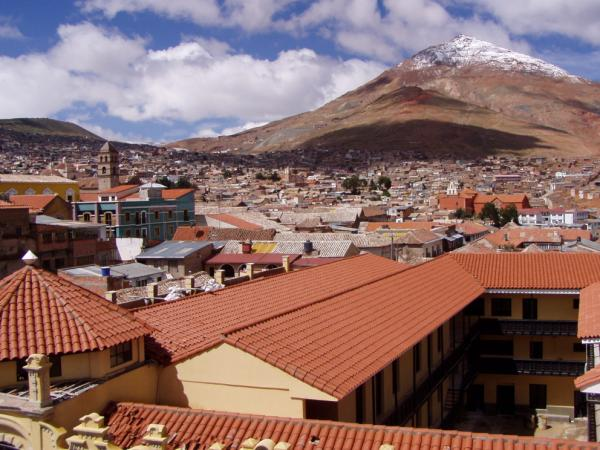
Potosí, Bolivia

== See also ==
- Corregimiento de Potosí
- The Devil's Miner, 2005 documentary film follows a fourteen-year-old boy, who along with his twelve-year-old brother, works in the mines near Potosí.
- Geology of Bolivia
- Great Potosi Mint Fraud of 1649
- Mapuche silver finery
- Pari Urqu
- Potosi (barque)
- Potosí mountain range
- San Cristóbal mine (Bolivia)
- El Tio
- Tinku – A local combat ritual and agricultural fertility rite
