= Bethlehem Township, Indiana =

Bethlehem Township is the name of two townships in the U.S. state of Indiana:

- Bethlehem Township, Cass County, Indiana
- Bethlehem Township, Clark County, Indiana

== See also ==
- Bethlehem Township (disambiguation)
