= Belem (disambiguation) =

Belém is the capital city of the Brazilian state of Pará.

Belem or Belém may also refer to:

Belem(n)ite can refer to fossils of Belemnoidea.

== Places ==
=== Brazil ===
- Belém, Alagoas
- Belém, Paraíba
- Belém (district of São Paulo)

=== Cape Verde ===
- Belém, Santiago
- Belém, São Nicolau

=== Portugal ===
- Belém (Lisbon)
- Giesteira (or Bairro de Belém), a neighbourhood of Póvoa de Varzim

== People ==
- Belém (footballer), Matheus José Belém de Souza, Brazilian football defender

== Other uses ==
- Belem (ship), a French three-masted barque
- Belém Tower, a fortified tower located in the Belém district of Lisbon, Portugal
- Belem Prison, a disused prison in Mexico City

== See also ==
- Belemites
- Belén (disambiguation)
- Bethlehem
