= Bethlehem, North Carolina =

Bethlehem, North Carolina may refer to:

- Bethlehem, Alexander County, North Carolina
- Bethlehem, Hertford County, North Carolina

== See also ==
- Bethlehem (disambiguation)
