= Belen (given name) =

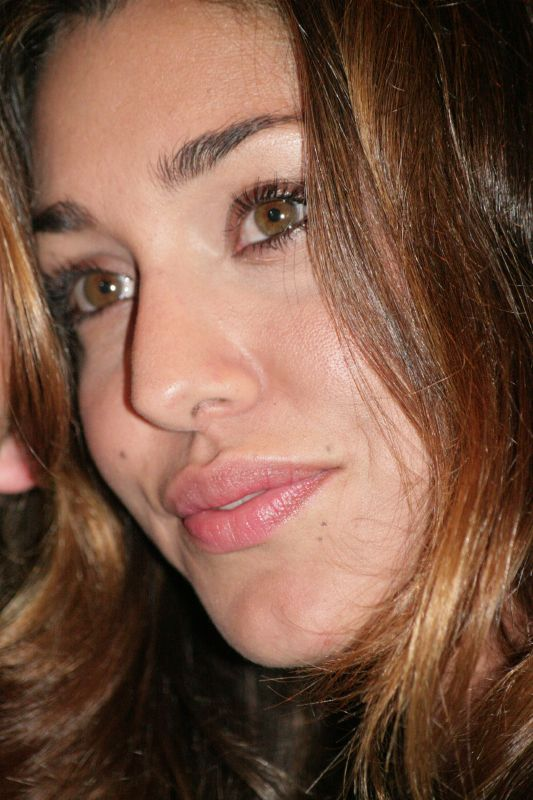
Belen Rodriguez

Belén is a feminine given name. People with the name include:

- Belén Arjona (born 1981), Spanish singer
- Belén Asensio (born 1976), Spanish taekwondo practitioner
- Belén Casetta (born 1994), Argentine runner
- Belén Esteban (born 1973), Spanish television personality
- Belén Estévez (born 1981), Argentine dancer and vedette
- Belén Fabra (born 1977), Spanish actress
- Belén Gache (born 1960), Argentine-born writer
- Belén García (born 1999), Spanish racing driver
- Belén Gopegui (born 1963), Spanish writer
- Belén López (disambiguation)
- Belén López Peiró (born 1992), Argentine writer
- Belén Potassa (born 1988), Argentine footballer
- Belén Rodríguez (born 1984), Argentine showgirl, model, and actress
- Belén Rueda (born 1965), Spanish actress
- Belén Sánchez (born 1972), Spanish sprint canoer
- Belén Scalella (born 1982), Argentine actress and singer
- Belén Succi (born 1985), Argentine field hockey player
- Belén Tavella (born 1990), Argentine sailor
