= Belén López =

Belén López may refer to:

- Belén López (actress) (born 1970), Spanish actress
- Belén López (flamenco dancer) (born 1986), Spanish flamenco and classical dancer
- Belén López (cyclist) (born 1984), Spanish cyclist
- Belén López, a character from Spanish television series Aquí no hay quien viva
- Belén López Peiró (born 1992), Argentine writer
