= Otto, Indiana =

Unincorporated community in Indiana, United States

Otto
- Unincorporated community
- Clark County's location in Indiana

- Location in Clark County
- Coordinates: 38°34′15″N 85°28′01″W
- Country: United States
- State: Indiana
- County: Clark
- Township: Bethlehem
- Elevation: 758 ft (231 m)
- ZIP code: 47162
- FIPS code: 18-57366
- GNIS feature ID: 440759

Otto is an unincorporated community in Bethlehem Township, Clark County, Indiana.

== History ==
A post office was established at Otto in 1864, and remained in operation until it was discontinued in 1950. The community was named after a judge.
