= Bethlehem Township =

Bethlehem Township may refer to:

== Indiana ==
- Bethlehem Township, Cass County, Indiana
- Bethlehem Township, Clark County, Indiana

== Missouri ==
- Bethlehem Township, Henry County, Missouri

== New Jersey ==
- Bethlehem Township, New Jersey

== Ohio ==
- Bethlehem Township, Coshocton County, Ohio
- Bethlehem Township, Stark County, Ohio

== Pennsylvania ==
- Bethlehem Township, Pennsylvania

== See also ==
- Bethlehem (disambiguation)
