= Corregimiento of Potosí =

Intendancy of the Spanish Empire

Corregimiento de Potosí
- Corregimiento of the Spanish Empire
- Coat of arms
- Capital: Potosí
- Historical era: Viceroyalties of Peru and the Río de la Plata
  - Established: 1565

The corregimiento (Spanish: [korexiˈmjento]) de Potosí was a territorial entity of the Spanish Empire in the Viceroyalty of Peru, located in what is now the territory of Bolivia. The position of corregidor was not an accessory of the President of the Real Audiencia of Charcas, it fell to various people. The corregidor resided alternately in La Plata (today Sucre) and in Potosí. In the 18th century, it became the Government of Potosí.

On the 29 of September 1538, the modern day city of Sucre was founded under the name of Ciudad de la Plata de la Nueva Toledo by Pedro of Anzúrez, marquess of Campo Redondo, on the site of an indigenous settlement named Chuquisaca on the orders of Francisco Pizarro.

In 1522 the Roman Catholic Archdiocese of Sucre was created, the first bishop of which was the dominican friar Domingo de Santo Tomás.

On the 18th of September 1559 Philip II of Spain established the Real Audiencia of Charcas over the territory of the corregimiento. On the 29 of August 1563 its territory was expanded to include the Governorate of Tucumán, the province of Santa Cruz de la Sierra y the territories between La Plata y the city of Cusco (these last ones were reintegrated into the Real Audiencia of Lima en 1573). On the first of October 1566 the Governorate of New Andalusia was also included.

In 1565 the Governor of Peru, Lope García de Castro, established the corregimientos in the viceroyalty, among them that of La Plata.

Towards 1629 the indigenous corregimientos de: Paria, Carangas, Cochabamba, Porco, Amparaes, Misque y Pocona, Chichas, Chayanta, Atacama, and los Lipes depended on the corregimiento of La Plata.

In 1624 the University of Saint Francis Xavier was founded.

== See also ==
- Cerro Rico
- Potosí
- National Mint of Bolivia
