= Marta Belen =

American opera singer

Marta Belen (December 1, 1942 – April 5, 2005) was an American opera singer, artist, and music coach. She was the first American to record Rachmaninoff's art songs in Russian.

== Early life and education ==
Marta Belen was born Martha Gradine Pinnell in the small town of Meridian, Texas to Grady Pinnell and Gladys Weehunt. She graduated with a degree in composition from Wichita State University and in 1967 received a degree in music theory from Pittsburg State University in Kansas. Later she studied voice with Igor Gorin at the University of Arizona in Tucson.

== Opera career ==
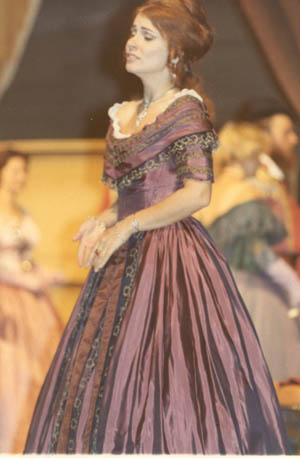
Marta Belen at her first opera performance

Between 1967 and 1977 Belen performed in multiple locations around the United States, Brazil, Portugal, and Spain. She sang for the Tucson Opera (now the Arizona Opera) and the San Francisco Opera. She sang the principal soprano role for La Traviata, Madame Butterfly, and La Boheme, as well as performing in La Sonnambula, Daughter of the Regiment (La fille du régiment), The Magic Flute, and The Abduction from the Seraglio. In the late 1970s she recorded Rachmaninoff's art songs with Paula Fan accompanying.

== Marriages ==
Marta married Roger Irwin in 1962. They later divorced in 1976. She married David Hutchinson in 1983.

== Spiritual life ==
In 1966 she began studying Buddhism, and lived in several spiritual ashrams over the following ten years. She lived briefly in the Millbrook, New York estate at the time that Timothy Leary was in residence. During this time she also met Ram Dass and Allen Ginsberg. In the early 1980s she studied Buddhism at the California Institute for Asian Studies (later the California Institute for Integral Studies).

== Later life and career ==
During the 1980s and 1990s Marta pursued various arts, including woodworking, photography, mosaic tile, writing, accompaniment, coaching, and composition. Along with her husband she wrote A Tale of Two Kitties, a book about her two cats. She was the principal accompanist for the Aurora Music Ensemble, and played frequently with the Sacramento Baroque Soloists, Camerata California, Sacramento Chamber String Quartet, Capitol Chamber Players, and the Music At Noon series. She created the Dilworth K. Simmons music scholarship to assist young music students. In 2004, while undergoing chemotherapy, she composed and directed an original musical, Cats Come Out To Play, based on popular Christmas carols and opera songs.
