= Abbott–Holloway Farm =

- U.S. National Register of Historic Places
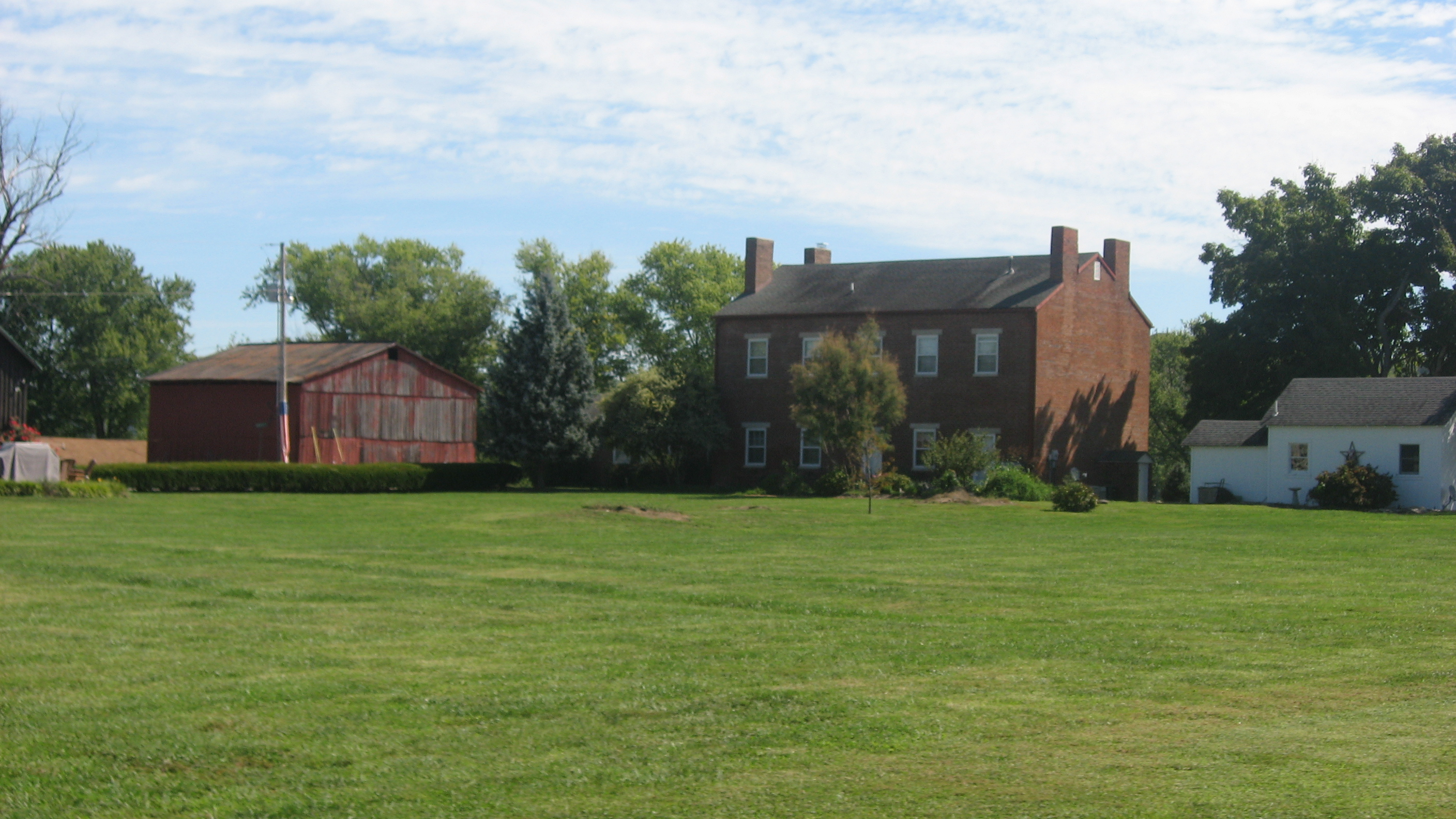
- Roadside view of the farm

- Location within Clark County, Indiana Location within Indiana Location within the United States
- Location: Roughly bounded by Second and Walnut Sts., and the Ohio R., Bethlehem, Indiana
- Coordinates: 38°32′14″N 85°25′16″W
- Built: 1830
- Architectural style: Federal
- NRHP reference No.: 94001129
- Added to NRHP: September 8, 1994

The Abbott–Holloway Farm contains a couple of the few early structures still standing in Bethlehem, Indiana, located in the extreme northeast section of Clark County, Indiana. It overlooks the Ohio River.

The land comprising the Abbott–Holloway Farm was first owned by Jonathan Clark, one of the early founders of Bethlehem in 1812. The primary building on the lot is believed to have been built in 1830 by Asa Abbott; records destroyed by the Ohio River flood of 1937 makes the exact date unknowable. When first built it was used as a store and post office, as Abbott was the postmaster for the town. Abbott is also believed to be the builder of the farm that also still stands. Due to fires and tornados, these buildings are among the few buildings constructed before 1840 still standing in Bethlehem; only two other houses still stand from the time.

After Abbott died in 1873, control of the town went to his widowed daughter Athenatia (Abbott) Ross. With her 1885 marriage to Missouri man Fleming Holloway, they and his children moved to the farm. During their time of ownership several more barns were placed on the property, but most of those structures were destroyed in a tornado during the 20th century. Upon Athenatia's 1899 death, Fleming gave up the house to his son Barnes Holloway, and moved to a smaller house on the property. In 1939 the farm was sold to Ira Church. Its modern owners acquired it in 1988 and turned it into a bed and breakfast.

The structures of the property include a main house, two sheds, and a privy. The main house is Federal two-story double-pile brick house with a one-story extension. It features a central passage, twin end chimneys, and side gable roof. Many of its doors are paneled wood with limestone lintels. The house was named in 1992 by the Historic Landmarks Foundation of Indiana among the ten most significant buildings in Clark County. The barn on the property is of a transverse-frame timber construction that has been converted for guest housing.

It was placed on the National Register of Historic Places in 1994, two years after its HLFI designation and one year after the local historical preservation group, the Historic Bethlehem Inc., was founded.

== Gallery ==
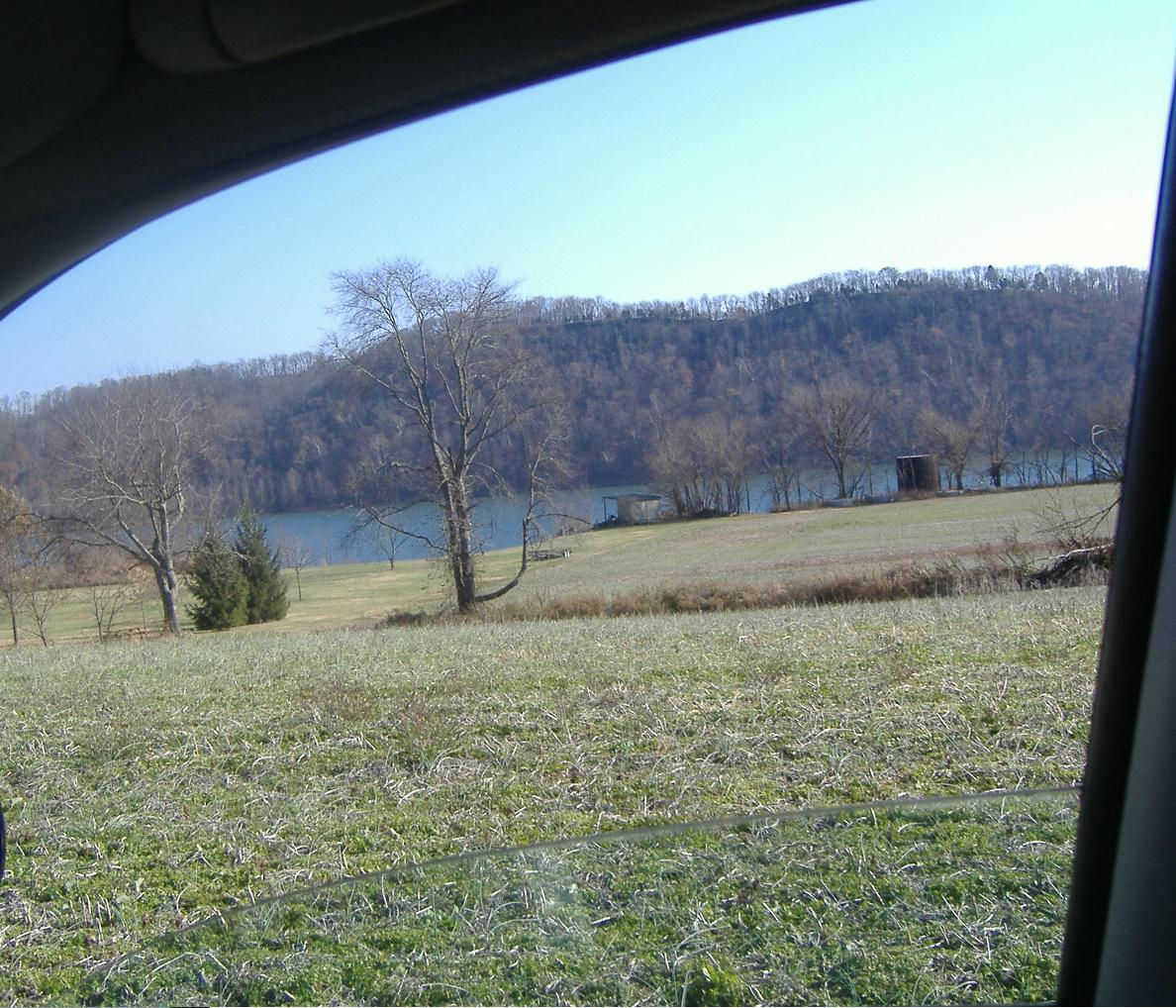
Abbott–Holloway farmland
