= Bethlehem, Indiana =

Unincorporated community in Indiana, United States

Bethlehem
- Unincorporated community
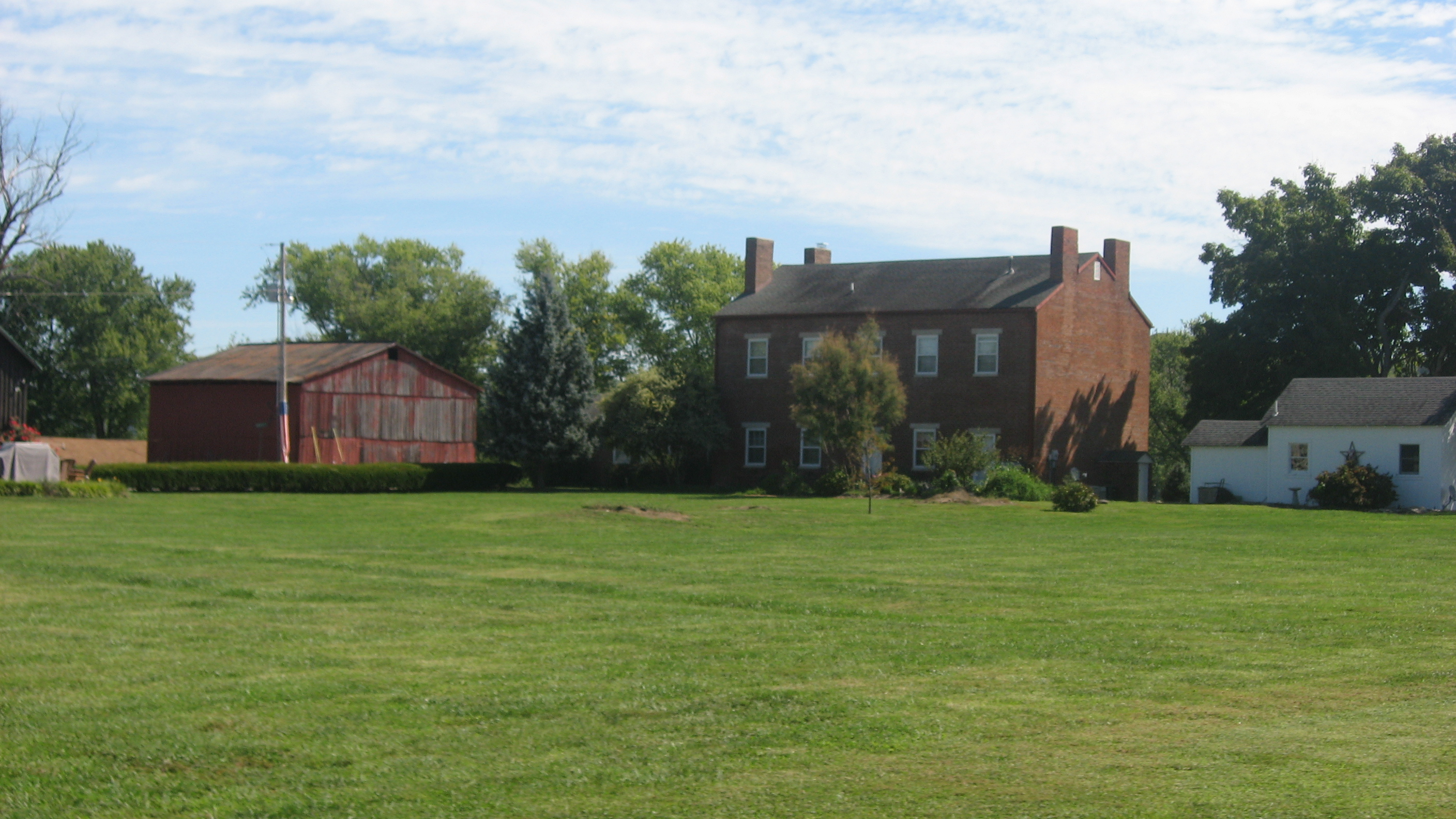
- The Abbott-Holloway Farm

- Clark County's location in Indiana

- Location in Clark County
- Coordinates: 38°32′21″N 85°25′14″W
- Country: United States
- State: Indiana
- County: Clark
- Township: Bethlehem
- Elevation: 472 ft (144 m)
- ZIP code: 47162
- FIPS code: 18-05104
- GNIS feature ID: 430971

Bethlehem is an unincorporated community in Bethlehem Township, Clark County, Indiana, United States, twenty-five miles up the Ohio River from Louisville, Kentucky. It was platted in 1812 and according to WPA records was presumably named for Bethlehem, Pennsylvania. Its first office was established on March 6, 1816. The community's post office is popular around Christmas with those wanting to have a Bethlehem postmark on Christmas letters and cards.

== History ==
Much of Bethlehem's history was destroyed by the Ohio River flood of 1937. What is known is that prior to its formation, the land which would become Bethlehem was owned by Colonel John Armstrong, who had been the commander of Fort Finney (located in present-day Jeffersonville, Indiana). The first settlers arrived at the site in 1805 Armstrong and others, most notably Jonathon Clark and William Plaskett, platted the community in 1812. It was laid out in 124 lots in a rectangular manner. Armstrong named it after Bethlehem, Pennsylvania, where he was born.

Early in its history, Bethlehem had a steamboat and ferry landing, and with its road to New Washington and Lexington, Indiana Bethlehem became a major transportation center. The economy of Bethlehem in the antebellum era focused on farming, shopping, and trade. By 1833, 300 individuals lived in the community.

Many of Bethlehem's early buildings, including a canning factory, gristmill, and sawmill, have been destroyed; particularly by fire and tornado. The main house of the Abbott-Holloway Farm is one of only three buildings before 1840 that still stands.

The largest crowd ever seen in Bethlehem was in 1861, when the locals waved their men goodbye to war. This hampered local efforts to continue farming. There was some concern in July 1863 that Morgan's Raid would visit the area, but it never occurred.

Census records show a loss in population from 1880 to 1900. By then Bethlehem no longer offered ferry service. It was large enough to have a Grand Army of the Republic post at the time. Just after 1900 Bethlehem also had a Red Men tribe and a Degree of Pocahontas council.

In 1993 Historic Bethlehem Inc. was founded. It turned the old elementary school into a community center (today's children attend school in New Washington), and started the annual Autumn on the River festival. In the next year the Abbott-Holloway Farm was listed on the National Register of Historic Places.

Due to its name, Bethlehem is a very popular place to mail out Christmas cards. Since 1947 a special cancellation stamp of "a red cachet of the Three Wise Men following the star to Bethlehem" is available. In December 5,000-7,000 letters may be mailed out, while during the rest of the year 100 letters is considered a busier than usual day. Most of the individuals mailing from Bethlehem come from outside Clark County.

== Geography ==
Bethlehem is located along the Ohio River, close to the border with Jefferson County, Indiana, and across the Ohio River from Oldham County, Kentucky.

The farmland rises well above the floodplain, which historically increased the need to ship goods using the Ohio River.

== Bibliography ==
- Campbell, Elinor (1914). The Town of Bethlehem, Indiana. Indiana Magazine of History.
- Kramer, Carl (2007). This Place We Call Home. Indiana University Press. ISBN 0-253-34850-1.
- Thayer, Laura (1994). Abbott-Holloway Farm NRHP Nomination Form. Indiana Department of Natural Resources.
