= Belén López (flamenco dancer) =

Spanish flamenco and classical dancer (born 1986)

Ana Belén López Ruiz (born 1986 in Tarragona) is a Spanish flamenco and classical dancer. The prestigious Berklee College of Music called her "one of the most passionate and roots-driven rising stars of flamenco dance." She is the Prima Ballerina of the Arena di Verona and Il Cambroio, and the muse of film director Franco Zeffirelli.

== Early years ==
Belen was born in 1986 in Tarragona. Her family was from Córdoba and Seville. She is said to have been born "with dancing shoes". Her talent came to the fore right from the age of 5 when she gave a performance in Barcelona as a tribute to Carmen Amaya. At the age of 9, she represented Spain at the Interfest in Moscow. In 1994, she danced at the Teatro de Madrid with Angel Corella, at a show to benefit UNICEF, and acted on Telecinco's "The Trampoline". In the same year, she appeared on the TV contest program, Bravo Bravissimo where she earned 2nd place in the classical dance category. At the age of 11, in 1997, she represented Spain at the World Tourism Fair in Saint Petersburg. She graduated from Conservatorio de Danza de Madrid.

== Career ==
At the age of 17 she established her own company which employs around 20 people. In 2004 in Córdoba, she won the first prize, "Mario Maya" in the Concurso Nacional de Arte Flamenco. Her debut show as a professional was in 2005 when she presented "Atrapados por el arte" in Tarragona and repeated this show on 21–22 January 2006 at the Teatro de Madrid. Her last number at this show was a solo (final baile), in which she displayed "experience, charisma, slyness and boundless virtuosity." She went on to be the lead dancer in four seasons of the Arena of Verona, appearing in the opera Carmen and in Franco Zeffirelli's Il Trovatore, which earned her the Mario Maya National Flamenco Award. Lopez directed, wrote and choreographed Cuando Amanece at the Teatro Nuevo Apolo in Madrid in 2008, and the following year won critical acclaim in A mi manera at the La Latina Theatre.

In 2012, Lopez traveled to Prague for her first performance in that city, and also to Brno in the Czech Republic where not only did she dance the flamenco, but she also added a fusion of tango. Lopez appeared at the tenth annual Flamenco Festival London in March 2013, along with Jesús Carmona, Antonio Canales, Sol Picó, and Carlos Rodríguez. She was featured in Lonely Planet magazine in the July 2013 edition. Lopez is scheduled to perform during the 2013–14 season at the University of Florida Performing Arts, where she is described as having "shotgun fast footwork and attitude to match" (Evening Standard).
