= Belén, Aroma =

Coordinates: 17.4003°S 67.5708°W

Belén (Aroma)
- Town
- Interactive map of Belén (Aroma)
- Country: Bolivia
- Department: La Paz Department
- Province: Aroma Province
- Municipality: Sica Sica Municipality

Population (2001)
  - Total: 520
- Time zone: UTC-4 (BOT)

Belén (Aroma) is a small town in Bolivia. In 2010 it had an estimated population of 643.
