= Bethlehem Township, Clark County, Indiana =

Bethlehem Township
- Township
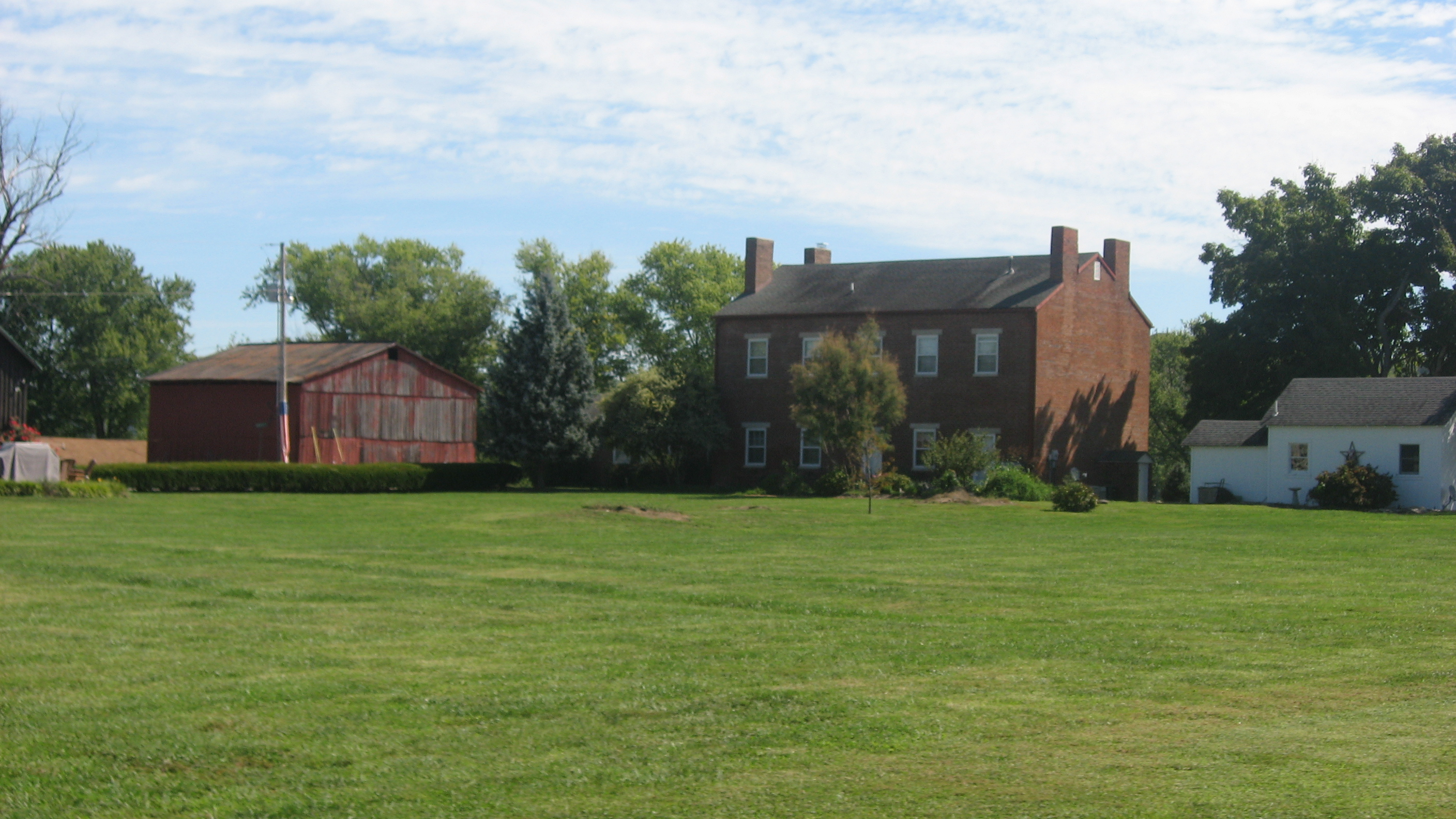
- The Abbott-Holloway Farm, a historic site in the township

- Location of Bethlehem Township in Clark County
- Coordinates: 38°32′49″N 85°27′26″W
- Country: United States
- State: Indiana
- County: Clark

Government
  - Type: Indiana township

Area
  - Total: 18.59 sq mi (48.1 km^{2})
  - Land: 18.27 sq mi (47.3 km^{2})
  - Water: 0.31 sq mi (0.80 km^{2})
- Elevation: 735 ft (224 m)

Population (2020)
  - Total: 383
  - Density: 16.9/sq mi (6.5/km^{2})
- FIPS code: 18-05122
- GNIS feature ID: 453109

Bethlehem Township is one of twelve townships in Clark County, Indiana, United States. As of the 2010 census, its population was 309 and it contained 127 housing units.

== History ==
Bethlehem Township was organized in 1816. It was named after the town of Bethlehem, Indiana.

== Geography ==
According to the 2010 census, the township has a total area of 18.59 square miles (48.1 km^{2}), of which 18.27 square miles (47.3 km^{2}) (or 98.28%) is land and 0.31 square miles (0.80 km^{2}) (or 1.67%) is water.

=== Unincorporated towns ===
- Bethlehem
- Miles Point
- Otto

(This list is based on USGS data and may include former settlements.)

=== Adjacent townships ===
- Owen Township (southwest)
- Washington Township (west)
- Saluda Township, Jefferson County (northwest)

=== Cemeteries ===
The township contains several cemeteries: Antioch, Bethlehem, Camp Creek, Louden, Mikesell, New Hope, Otto, Palmer, Patterson, Ross, Tiaris, Turner, and Waters (aka Stoner).
