= Belen point =

Archaeological artifacts found in New Mexico, US

The Belen point is an unfluted, lanceolate-shaped Paleoindian projectile point found in the central Rio Grande Valley of New Mexico. It is the second most prevalent type of Paleoindian point in the area after the Folsom point. It was named in the 1960s by Ele Baker after the town of Belen, New Mexico where the points were initially discovered.

== Age and cultural affiliations ==
The Belen point has not been dated, although it is known to be of the Paleoindian period and is likely similar in date to the Folsom point. It is believed that the Belen culture was active during the same period as that of the Folsom and campsites have been found which indicate that the cultures occupied the same locations. Although no examples of mixed campsites exist, multiple instances of sites appearing alongside each other have been observed.

The Belen people used and manufactured tools of an identical nature to that of Folsom and other Paleoindian cultures such as scrapers and gravers all featuring points with ground lateral and proximal edges. The divergence between the artifacts of the Belen and Folsom peoples lies in the lithic material. Although, both used fine cryptocrystalline material, the Belen people used chert and jasper, locally sourced from the southeast of Belen, New Mexico, while Folsom used predominantly obsidian and chalcedony from Belen's northeast.
