= Cuchu Ingenio =

Coordinates: 19°55′S 65°40′W

- Town
- Interactive map of Cuchu Ingenio
- Country: Bolivia
- Time zone: UTC-4 (BST)

Cuchu Ingenio is a small town in Bolivia. In 2001 it had an estimated population of 406.
