= Belém, Alagoas =

Municipality of Alagoas, Brazil

Belém
- Municipality of Alagoas, Brazil
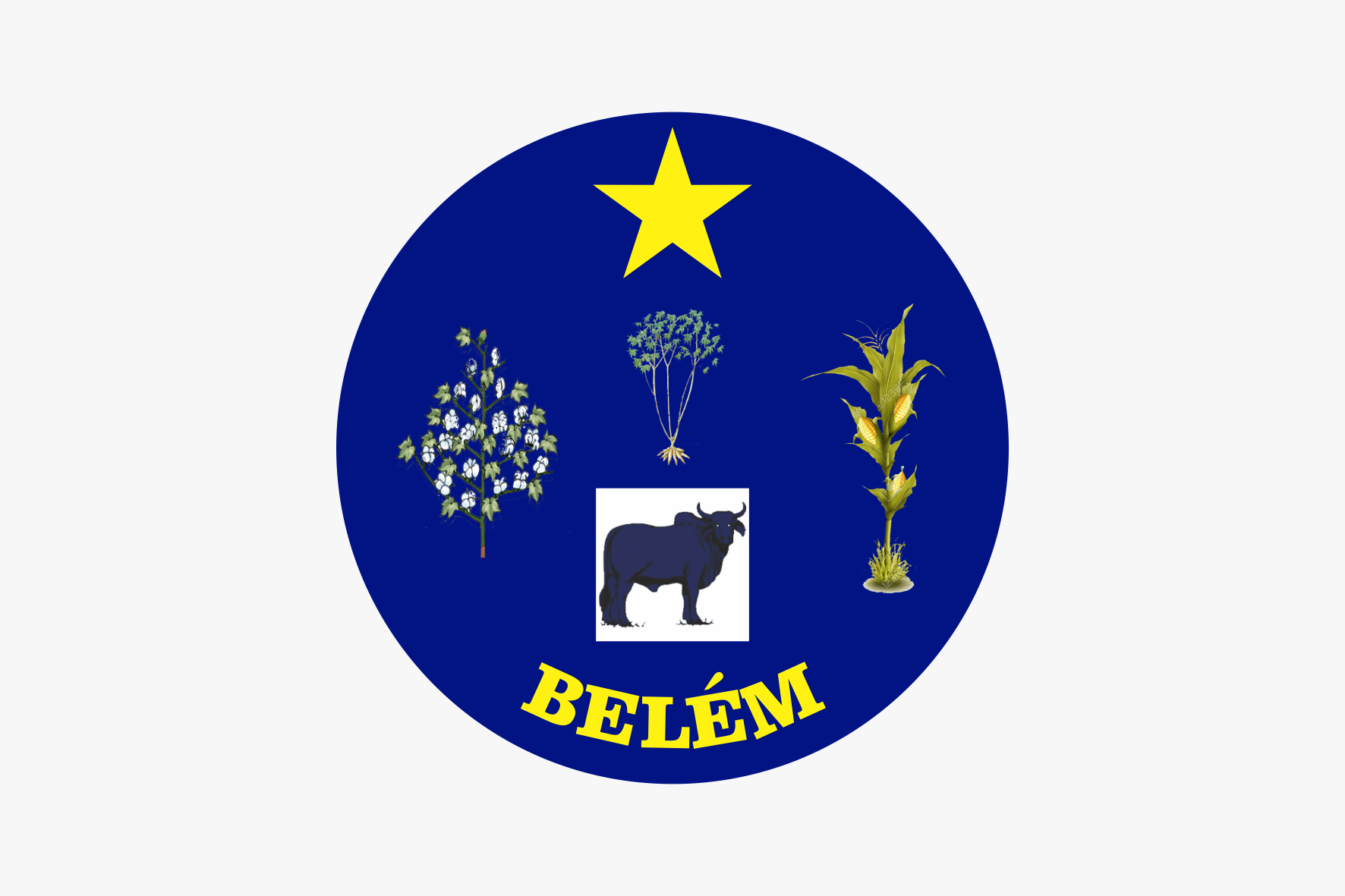
- Flag

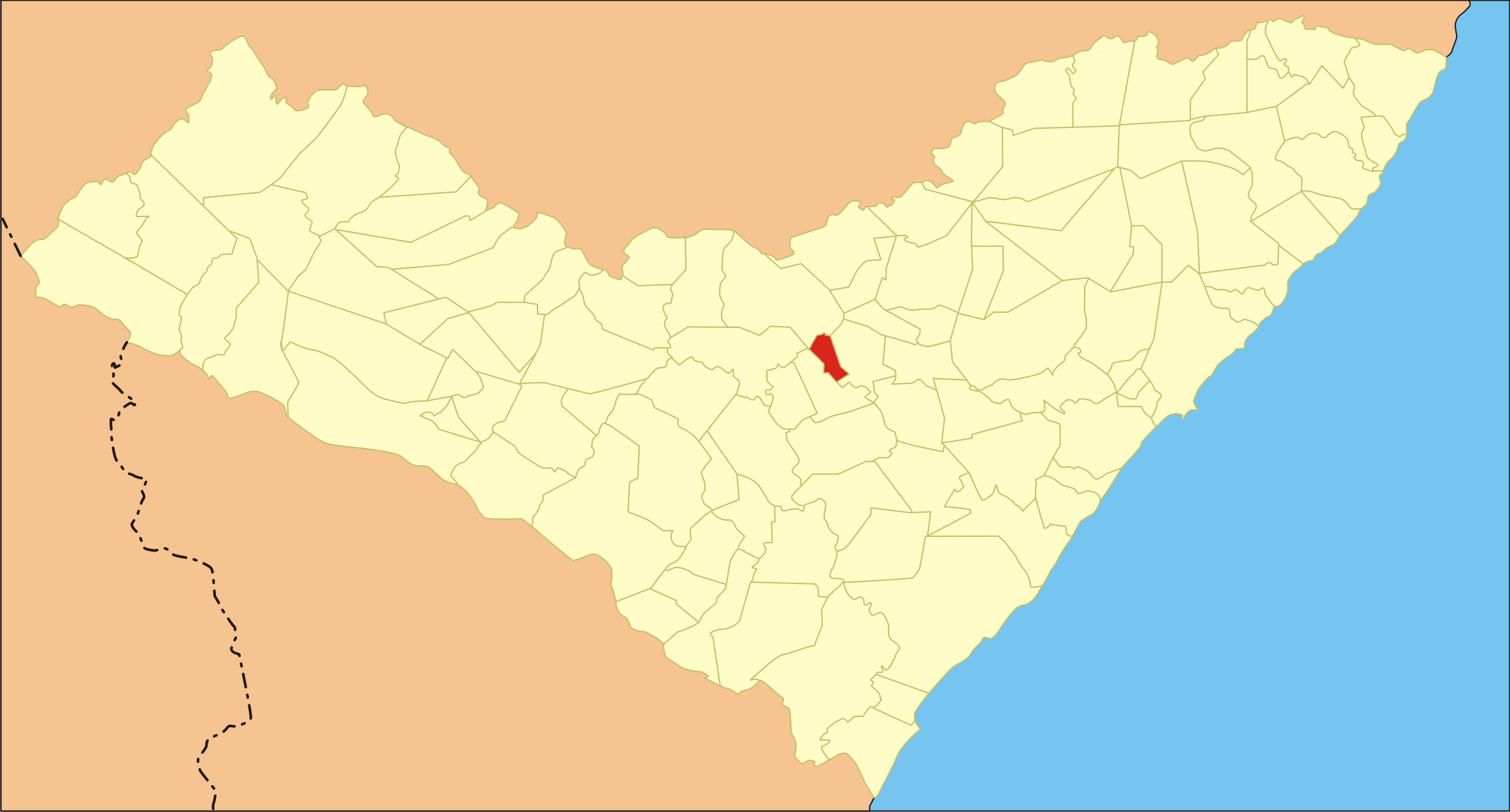
- Location of Belém in Alagoas

- Location within Brazil Location within South America
- Coordinates: 9°34′16″S 36°29′32″W
- Country: Brazil
- Region: Northeast
- State: Alagoas
- Founded: 24 August 1962

Government
  - Mayor: Adalberto Antero Torres (PP) (2025-2028)
  - Vice Mayor: José Adriano da Silva (MDB) (2025-2028)

Area
  - Total: 66.628 km^{2} (25.725 sq mi)
- Elevation: 311 m (1,020 ft)

Population (2022)
  - Total: 4,722
  - Density: 70.87/km^{2} (183.6/sq mi)
- Demonym: Belenense (Brazilian Portuguese)
- Time zone: UTC-03:00 (Brasília Time)
- Postal code: 57630-000
- HDI (2010): 0.593 – medium
- Website: belem.al.gov.br

Belém (Central northeastern portuguese pronunciation: [bɛˈlẽj̃]) is a municipality located in the center of the Brazilian state of Alagoas. Its population is 4,284 (2020) and its area is 48 km^{2}.

== See also ==
- List of municipalities in Alagoas
