= Bethlehem, Marion County, Ohio =

Coordinates: 40°29′01″N 83°07′55″W

Bethlehem is an extinct town in Marion County, in the U.S. state of Ohio. The community was 3 miles northwest of Waldo.

== History ==
Bethlehem had its start around 1860 as a small colony of German and Irish Catholics.
