= Belemites =

Term used to describe an officer who shirked his duty

Belemite was a term used during the Napoleonic Wars by English troops to describe an officer who shirked his duty, preferring to remain safely behind the lines. Belém, outside of Lisbon, was the location of a convent used by the army as a hospital. Charles Oman in his 1912 “Wellington's Army, 1809–1814” describes,

The "Belemites," so called from the general depot at the convent of Belem in the suburbs of Lisbon. This was the headquarters of all officers absent from the front as convalescents or on leave, and the limited proportion who stayed there over-long, and showed an insufficient eagerness to return to their regiments, were nicknamed from the spot where they lingered beyond the bounds of discretion.
Wellington occasionally gave an order to Colonel Peacocke, the military governor of Lisbon, to rout up this coterie. There were always a sprinkling there who were not over-anxious to resume the hard life of campaigning, and loved too much the gambling-hells and other sordid delights of Lisbon.
