= Bethlehem, Harrison County, West Virginia =

Unincorporated community in West Virginia, United States

- Unincorporated community
- Location within West Virginia Location within the United States
- Coordinates: 39°23′31″N 80°16′50″W
- Country: United States
- State: West Virginia
- County: Harrison
- Elevation: 974 ft (297 m)
- Time zone: UTC-5 (Eastern (EST))
  - Summer (DST): UTC-4 (EDT)
- Area codes: 304 & 681
- GNIS feature ID: 1535727

Bethlehem (also known as Scott) is an unincorporated community in Harrison County, West Virginia, United States. Bethlehem is located on County Route 12 along the eastern border of Shinnston.
