= Bethlehem, Louisiana =

Unincorporated community in Louisiana, U.S.

Coordinates: 32°00′20″N 92°46′25″W

Bethlehem is an unincorporated community in Winn Parish, Louisiana, United States.
