= Belen, Tarsus =

Belen
- Neighbourhood
- Location in Turkey
- Coordinates: 37°02′N 34°42′E
- Country: Turkey
- Province: Mersin
- District: Tarsus
- Elevation: 615 m (2,018 ft)
- Population (2022): 546
- Time zone: UTC+3 (TRT)
- Area code: 0324

Belen is a neighbourhood in the municipality and district of Tarsus, Mersin Province, Turkey. Its population is 546 (2022). It is situated in the Taurus Mountains. Its distance to Tarsus is 30 kilometres (19 mi) and its distance to Mersin is 55 kilometres (34 mi). The area around Belen was populated in the Roman Empire era of the 2nd and 3rd centuries, evident from a necropolis area next to the village. The village itself, however, was founded during the Ottoman period. The village's main economic activities are agriculture animal breeding and poultry husbandry.
