= Belén, Potosí =

Coordinates: 19.8672°S 65.5453°W

Belén (Potosí)
- Village
- Interactive map of Belén (Potosí)
- Country: Bolivia
- Time zone: UTC-4 (BST)

Belén (Potosí) is a village in Bolivia. In 2010 it had an estimated population of 149.
