= Belén López Peiró =

Argentine writer (born 1992)

Belén López Peiró (born February 24, 1992, in Buenos Aires, Buenos Aires, Argentina) is an Argentine book writer and columnist. Signed to Libros Penguin, she is best known for her 2018 release, "Por Que Volvías Cada Verano?" ("Why Did You Return Every Summer?") in which she detailed the sexual abuse she survived.

López Peiró is also a columnist for El País, a Spaniard newspaper with a nationwide reach in her adopted country of Spain.

== Early life ==
López Peiró was born in 1992, the daughter of a journalist mother. By some accounts, she spent a mostly happy childhood, until the rapes and sexual molestation by her uncle-in-law started taking place after she turned 13.

López Peiró visited her aunt in the city of Santa Lucia, in Argentina, during summers. It was while there, that the rapes of her by her uncle in law, a policeman by the name of Claudio Sarlo, the city's sheriff, took place. This situation took place from the time she was 13, until she was 17.

Eventually, she became a student at the Universidad de Buenos Aires (UBA), from where she graduated with a degree in communication sciences. She also studied journalism at the Taller Escuela Agencia (TEA). At the UBA, she was a student of well-known writer Gabriela Cabezon Camara.

== Career ==
By 2014, López Peiró worked as an editor for a newspaper in Argentina, when she figured that many of the stories she came across as an editor reminded her of her own.

Her first book, "Por qué volvías cada verano?", was published by Spain's Editorial Las Afueras on November 16, 2020. That book was also published in Portuguese, Italian and French. Her second book, titled "Donde no Hago Pie" ("Where I Would Not Go To") was released on March 1, 2021, by Publicadora Lumen. Both books deal directly with the sexual abuse she was subjected to.

== Uncle in law's trial ==
During 2014, López Peiró accused sheriff Sarlo of rape. The case took eight years to be decided, but on December 19, 2022, it went to court. Five days later, on December 24, Sarlo was declared guilty. He was then sentenced to ten years in jail.

== Books impact on women ==
López Peiró's book "Porque Volvias Cada Verano?" and her activism inspired Brazilian actress Thelma Fardin and others, such as Gianella Neyra, to speak about their own abuse cases. In Fardin's case, she accused her countryman, actor Juan Darthes, of sexual abuse towards Fardin.

== Personal life ==
Belén López Peiró lives in Barcelona, Spain.

== See also ==
- List of Argentines
