= Indiana State Road 3 =

Highway in Indiana

State Road 3
- SR 3; mainline in red, business route in blue

Route information
- Maintained by INDOT
- Length: 225.148 mi (362.341 km)
- Existed: October 1, 1926–present

Southern segment
- Length: 180.352 mi (290.248 km)
- South end: SR 62 in Charlestown
- Major intersections: US 50 in North Vernon; I-74 in Greensburg; US 52 in Rushville; I-70 near Spiceland; US 36 in Mount Summit; US 35 in Muncie
- North end: US 224 in Markle

Northern segment Lima Road
- Length: 44.796 mi (72.092 km)
- South end: I-69 / US 24 / US 27 / US 30 in Fort Wayne
- Major intersections: US 6 in Kendallville; US 20 near LaGrange
- North end: SR 120 near Brighton

Location
- Country: United States
- State: Indiana
- Counties: Clark, Scott, Jennings, Decatur, Rush, Henry, Delaware, Blackford, Wells, Huntington, Allen, DeKalb, Noble, LaGrange

Highway system
- Indiana State Highway System; Interstate; US; State; Scenic
← SR 2	→ SR 4

State Road 3 (SR 3) in the U.S. state of Indiana is a discontinuous state highway running through eastern Indiana from near the Ohio River to near the Michigan state line. The southernmost terminus is at SR 62 in Charlestown, and the northernmost terminus is at SR 120 near Brighton.

The route was continuous until 1972, when the route was split into two segments that exist today.

== Route description ==
=== Southern section ===
SR 3 begins just south of Charlestown at SR 62 and heads north toward downtown Charlestown. When in downtown Charlestown SR 3 intersects SR 403. SR 3 heads north out of Charlestown. Then just over 17 miles (27 km) north of SR 403, there is a wrong-way concurrency with SR 203 for 1.85 miles (2.98 km), meaning southbound SR 203 and northbound SR 3 are going the same direction. After SR 203, SR 3 heads north toward Vernon and then North Vernon. In North Vernon SR 3 has an intersection with U.S. Route 50 (US 50). After North Vernon SR 3 heads mainly due north for 22 1/2 miles (36.2 km) until SR 46 just west of Greensburg. SR 3 joins SR 46 on a four-lane divided highway and then enters Greensburg from the southwest. After entering Greensburg SR 46 leaves SR 3 at Main Street. In downtown Greensburg SR 3 has an intersection with US 421.

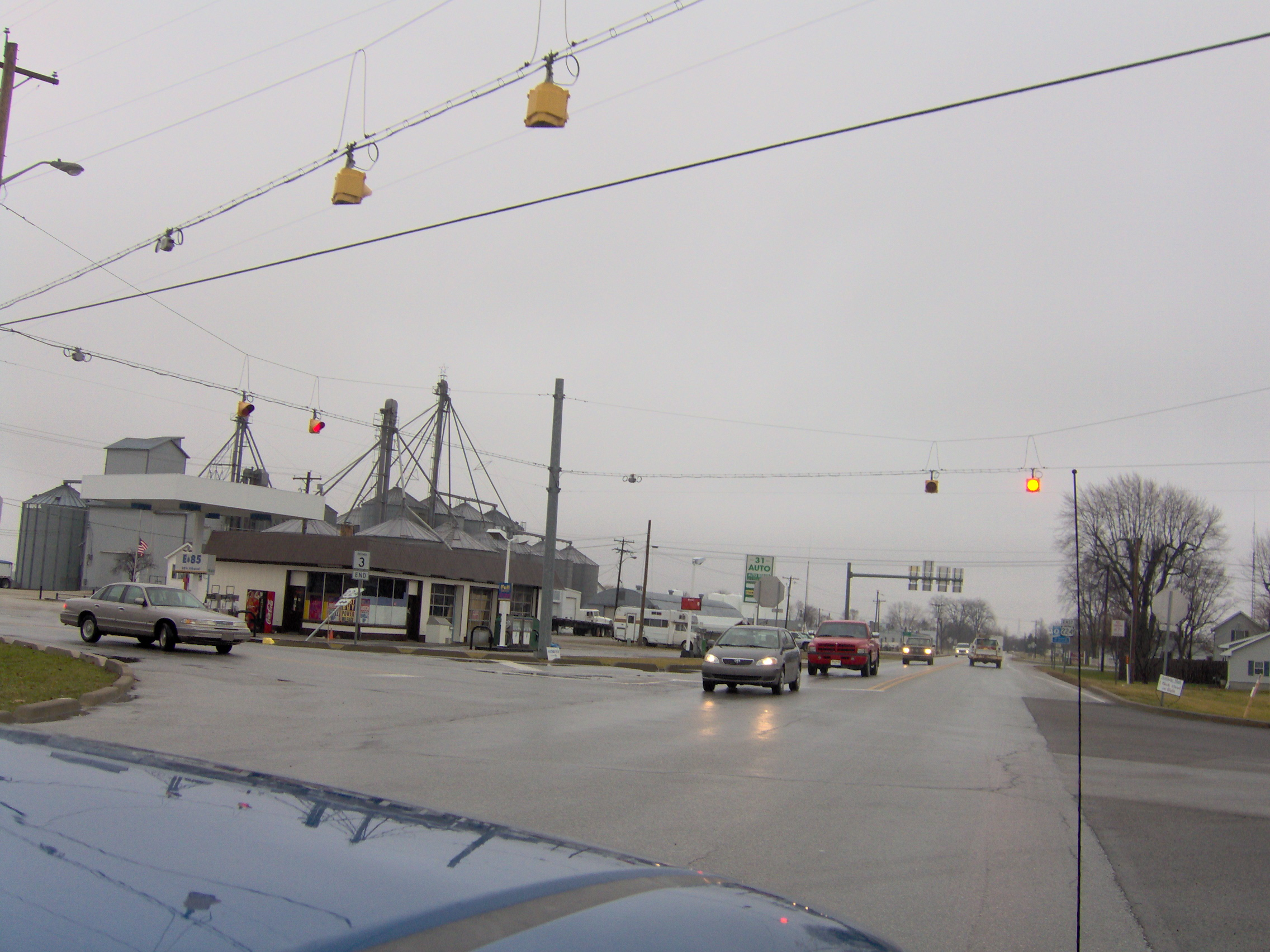
View of the north end of the southern section of SR 3 at Markle

After US 421, SR 3 leaves Greensburg heading northeast, then just north. SR 3 has an interchange with Interstate 74 (I-74), 1 1/2 miles (2.4 km) from US 421. After I-74, SR 3 becomes a two-lane undivided highway. SR 3 has a concurrency with US 52 that lasts for 0.42 miles (0.68 km) in Rushville. SR 3 heads due north toward US 40 and then SR 3 heads east on US 40 for a short concurrency after 0.07 miles (0.11 km). After US 40, SR 3 has an interchange with I-70. Just south of I-70 SR 3 becomes a four-lane divided highway. After I-70, SR 3 passes near New Castle. SR 3 and US 36 have an interchange near Mount Summit. After US 36, SR 3 head north toward Muncie, where SR 3 has an interchange with SR 67.

At the interchange with SR 67, SR 3 heads east, then north along the bypass. Interchange includes US 35 south, SR 32, and SR 67 north. The bypass is a limited-access highway.

North of the Muncie Bypass, US 35 leaves SR 3 due west to Kokomo. After US 35, SR 3 heads due north to Markle. Passing through Hartford City, where SR 3 meets SR 26. South of Markle SR 3 turns northeast, then SR 3 meets SR 116. Then 0.46 miles (0.74 km) after SR 116, SR 3 comes to its northern terminus of the southern section of SR 3, at US 224.

=== Northern section ===
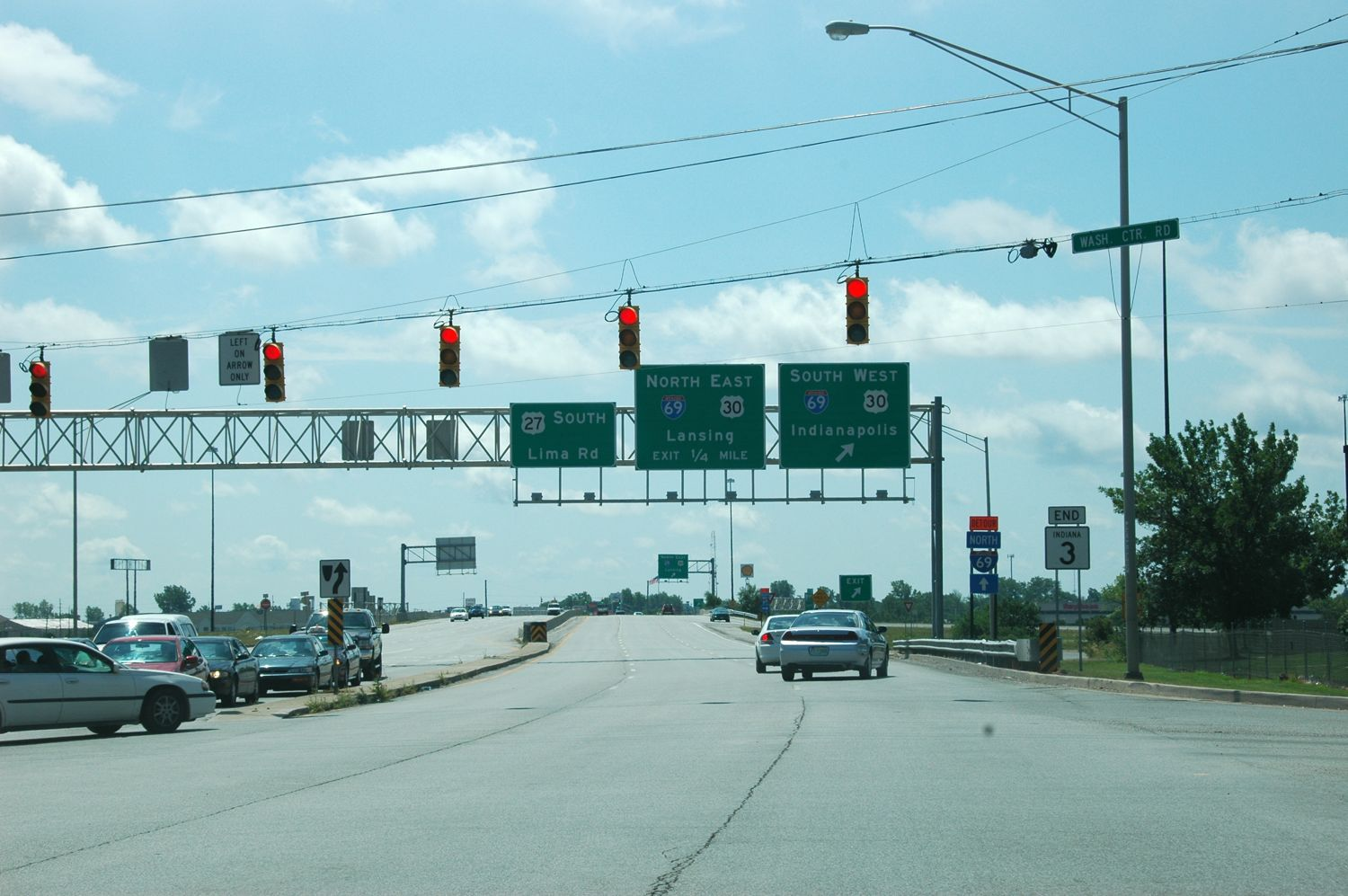
Southern terminus of the northern section of SR 3 at I-69 and the northern terminus of US 27 in Fort Wayne

The southern terminus of the northern section of SR 3 begins at I-69 and the northern terminus of US 27. The road heads north from this point, as a six–lane major arterial passing through both commercial and residential areas. North of Dupont Road, on the northside of Fort Wayne, the road becomes a rural four–lane divided highway. North of Fort Wayne, the route bypasses Huntertown, 8.20 miles (13.20 km) north of I-69. The road then enters Dekalb County, with a traffic light at SR 205. Very soon after SR 205, the road enters Noble County, bypassing LaOtto and Avilla. In Noble County, the route passes through rural farming land and parallels an abandoned railroad track on its way to Kendallville. In Kendallville the route has a short concurrency with US 6. After the US 6 concurrency SR 3, becomes a two–lane rural highway heading due North, until Mongo where the road turns northwest. Entering into Brighton, SR 3 reaches its northern terminus at SR 120.

== History ==
Between 1972 and 1973, SR 3 was removed between US 224 in Markle and I-69 on the north side of Fort Wayne. The final route through the Fort Wayne metro area followed Indianapolis Road/Baer Road past the city's main airport (then known as Baer Field) to Lower Huntington Road in the Waynedale district of Fort Wayne. SR 3 there turned east onto that road for only a short distance, before turning north again onto Bluffton Road (SR 1). Bluffton Road hugs the bank of the St. Mary's River before curving east and crossing it. SR 1 and SR 3 then immediately turned south onto Broadway for two blocks before turning east onto Rudisill Boulevard. SR 1/SR 3 followed Rudisill Boulevard to Lafayette Street (US 27/US 33 northbound) and Clinton Street (US 27/US 33 southbound) at which points the state routes turned north to join the others heading to/from downtown Fort Wayne. In the heart of the city US 33 departed, then upon leaving downtown Lafayette Street becomes Spy Run Boulevard (still one way northbound) before joining Clinton Street on the north side of the city. Shortly thereafter, US 27/SR 1/SR 3 turned toward the northwest onto Northrop Street and Lima Road until they reached the I-69 interchange, where SR 3 continued north on Lima Road and US 27/SR 1 turned east onto northbound I–69. With SR 3 through traffic easily using the then-recently completed I-69 to bypass Fort Wayne, the route between US 224 and the junction with SR 1 on the southwest side was turned back over to local control and the SR 3 designation was removed along the portions shared with other routes within the city.

Until 1980, SR 3 ran concurrently with SR 62 until it reached I-65 in Jeffersonville.

In 1990, the four-lane upgrade from the DeKalb–Allen County line north of Huntertown to Kendallville was completed, bypassing the towns of LaOtto and Avilla. This made SR 3 four lanes for the 25 miles (40 km) from I-69 in Fort Wayne to US 6 in Kendallville.

In early 2010, construction began on SR 3 widening for about three miles (4.8 km) from Ludwig Road in Fort Wayne to Dupont Road on the north side of Fort Wayne. This section of highway along Lima Road was widened from four-lane divided roadway to six-lane divided highway and was completed in November 2011.

At one point, the northern terminus was at the Michigan state line.

== Major intersections ==
County	Location	mi	km	Destinations	Notes
Clark	Charlestown	0.000	0.000	SR 62	Southern terminus of SR 3
Clark	Charlestown	1.137	1.830	CR 403 south – Sellersburg	Former SR 403 south
Clark	Oregon Township	11.409	18.361	CR 203 north – Lexington	Former SR 203 north
Clark–Scott county line	Washington–Lexington township line	12.147	19.549	SR 362 east – Nabb	Western terminus of SR 362
Scott	Lexington Township	15.761	25.365	SR 356 – Vienna, Lexington	
Scott	Lexington Township	18.282	29.422	SR 56 west / SR 203 north – Scottsburg	Southern end of SR 56/SR 203 concurrency
Scott	Lexington Township	20.112	32.367	SR 203 south – Lexington	Northern end of SR 203 concurrency
Scott	Lexington Township	21.319– 21.437	34.310– 34.500	SR 56 east – Madison	Northern end of SR 56 concurrency
Jefferson	Graham Township	23.428	37.704	SR 256 – Austin, Madison, Hardy Lake	
Jennings	Montgomery Township	29.725	47.838	SR 250 east – Paris	Southern end of SR 250 concurrency
Jennings	Montgomery Township	29.970	48.232	SR 250 west – Paris Crossing	Northern end of SR 250 concurrency
Jennings	Vernon Township	41.031	66.033	SR 7 south – Madison	Southern end of SR 7 concurrency
Jennings	Center Township	45.515	73.249	SR 7 north / US 50 west	Northern end of SR 7 concurrency; western end of US 50 concurrency
Jennings	Center Township	46.441	74.740	US 50 east	Eastern end of US 50 concurrency
Decatur	Clay Township	67.626	108.833	SR 46 west – Columbus	Southern end of SR 46 concurrency
Decatur	Craig	71.029	114.310	SR 46 east – Greensburg, Historic Tower Tree, Airport	Northern end of SR 46 concurrency
Decatur	Greensburg	72.616	116.864	US 421 (North Michigan Avenue) – Business District	
Decatur	Washington Township	73.943– 74.408	119.000– 119.748	I-74 – Indianapolis, Cincinnati	I-74 exit 134
Rush	Anderson Township	83.431	134.269	SR 244 – Milroy	
Rush	Rushville	91.373	147.051	US 52 east – Brookville	Southern end of US 52 concurrency
Rush	Rushville	91.767	147.685	US 52 Truck west / Truck SR 44 (1st Street)	
Rush	Rushville	91.809	147.752	US 52 west / SR 44 (2nd Street)	Northern end of US 52 concurrency
Henry	Spiceland Township	105.375	169.585	US 40 west – Indianapolis	Western end of US 40 concurrency
Henry	Dunreith	106.108	170.764	US 40 east – Richmond	Eastern end of US 40 concurrency
Henry	Spiceland Township	110.483– 110.665	177.805– 178.098	I-70 – Indianapolis, Columbus, OH	Exit 123 on I-70
Henry	New Castle	116.495	187.481	SR 38 (Broad Street) – Business District	
Henry	Prairie Township	121.610– 121.818	195.712– 196.047	US 36 – Lynn, Mount Summit	Interchange
Delaware	Monroe Township	131.232– 131.300	211.197– 211.307	SR 67 south – Indianapolis, Muncie, Ivy Tech	Southern end of SR 67 concurrency; interchange
Delaware	Muncie	132.805	213.729	US 35 south – Richmond, Muncie	Southern end of US 35 concurrency; interchange; southbound exit and northbound entrance
Delaware	Center Township	134.452	216.380	Memorial Drive	Interchange
Delaware	Muncie	135.471	218.019	SR 32 – Winchester, Muncie	Interchange
Delaware	Hamilton Township	138.930	223.586	SR 67 north – Portland	Northern end of SR 67 concurrency; interchange
Delaware	Hamilton Township	139.570	224.616	Muncie (Old State Road 3 south) – Ball State University	Interchange; southbound exit and northbound entrance
Delaware	Hamilton Township	141.800	228.205	US 35 north / SR 28 – Alexandria, Albany	Northern end of US 35 concurrency
Blackford	Hartford City	153.857	247.609	SR 26 (Washington Street)	
Blackford	Washington Township	160.894	258.934	SR 18 – Marion, Montpelier	
Wells–Huntington county line	Jackson–Salamonie township line	167.891	270.194	SR 218 – Warren, Poneto	
Huntington	Salamonie–Rock Creek township line	173.850	279.784	SR 124 – Mount Etna, Bluffton	
Huntington	Markle	179.987	289.661	SR 116 (Morse Street)	
Huntington	Markle	180.352	290.248	US 224 (Logan Street) to I-69 / SR 3 north	Northern end of southern section
Gap in route
Allen	Fort Wayne	180.352– 180.470	290.248– 290.438	I-69 / US 24 / US 30 / US 27 south (Lima Road) – Indianapolis, Lansing	Southern terminus of northern section of SR 3 and northern terminus of US 27
DeKalb	Butler Township	192.283	309.449	SR 205 – LaOtto, Churubusco, Garrett	
Noble	Avilla	197.606	318.016	SR 8 east / East Albion Street – Avilla, Auburn	Southern end of SR 8 concurrency
Noble	Allen Township	200.243	322.260	SR 8 west – Albion	Northern end of SR 8 concurrency
Noble	Kendallville	204.655	329.360	US 6 west (West North Street) – G.S. Porter Historic Site	Western end of US 6 concurrency
Noble	Kendallville	205.290	330.382	US 6 east (North Street) – Waterloo	Eastern end of US 6 concurrency
LaGrange	Springfield Township	218.732	352.015	US 20 – LaGrange, Elkhart, Angola	
LaGrange	Brighton	225.148	362.341	SR 120 – Elkhart, Orland	Northern terminus of SR 3
1.000 mi = 1.609 km; 1.000 km = 0.621 mi: Concurrency terminus
