= Indiana State Road 203 =

State highway in Indiana, United States

State Road 203
- SR 203 highlighted in red

Route information
- Maintained by INDOT
- Length: 13.526 mi (21.768 km)

Major junctions
- South end: SR 362 near Nabb
- North end: SR 256 at New Frankfort

Location
- Country: United States
- State: Indiana
- Counties: Clark, Scott

Highway system
- Indiana State Highway System; Interstate; US; State; Scenic
← SR 201	→ SR 205

State Road 203 is a 14-mile north–south highway in the U.S. state of Indiana that runs mostly in Scott County.

== Route description ==
At the south end, State Road 203 begins just within Clark County at State Road 362 and passes north through the town of Lexington. It is concurrent with both State Road 3 and State Road 56 east of Scottsburg, and then continues north to State Road 256 near New Frankfort.

== History ==
In September 2012, the section of SR 203 in Clark County was decommissioned.

== Major intersections ==
County	Location	mi	km	Destinations	Notes
Clark–Scott county line	Oregon–Lexington township line	0.000	0.000	SR 362	Southern terminus of SR 203
Scott	Lexington	3.617	5.821	SR 356 west	Western end of SR 356 concurrency
Scott	Lexington	3.778	6.080	SR 356 east – Hanover	Eastern end of SR 356 concurrency
Scott	Lexington Township	7.216	11.613	SR 3 north / SR 56 west – Vernon, Hanover	Eastern end of SR 3/SR 56 concurrency
Scott	Lexington Township	9.050	14.565	SR 3 south	Western end of SR 3 concurrency
Scott	Lexington Township	10.045	16.166	SR 56 west – Scottsburg	Western end of SR 56 concurrency
Scott	Johnson Township	13.526	21.768	SR 256 – Austin, Madison	Northern terminus of SR 203
1.000 mi = 1.609 km; 1.000 km = 0.621 mi: Concurrency terminus
