= Indiana State Road 362 =

State highway in Indiana, United States

State Road 362
- SR 362 highlighted in red

Route information
- Maintained by INDOT
- Length: 7.415 mi (11.933 km)

Major junctions
- West end: SR 3 near Lexington
- East end: SR 62 near New Washington

Location
- Country: United States
- State: Indiana
- Counties: Clark, Jefferson, Scott

Highway system
- Indiana State Highway System; Interstate; US; State; Scenic
← SR 358	→ SR 364

State Road 362 in the U.S. state of Indiana is a short seven-mile (11 km) route in the southeastern portion of the state.

== Route description ==
State Road 362 straddles the Clark County border with Scott and Jefferson counties. It begins at State Road 3 near Garry's Trucking Service and runs directly east along the county line, intersecting with State Road 203 and passing through the town of Nabb. It terminates where it reaches State Road 62 north of New Washington.

== Major intersections ==
County	Location	mi	km	Destinations	Notes
Scott–Clark county line	Lexington–Oregon township line	0.000	0.000	SR 3	Western terminus of SR 362
Scott–Clark county line	Lexington–Oregon township line	0.714	1.149	SR 203 north – Lexington	Southern terminus of SR 203
Jefferson–Clark county line	Saluda–Washington township line	7.415	11.933	SR 62 – Charlestown, New Washington, Hanover	Eastern terminus of SR 362
1.000 mi = 1.609 km; 1.000 km = 0.621 mi
