= Indiana State Road 356 =

State highway in Indiana, United States

State Road 356
- SR 356 highlighted in red

Route information
- Maintained by INDOT
- Length: 25.270 mi (40.668 km)
- Existed: 1932–present

Western section
- Length: 9.911 mi (15.950 km)
- West end: SR 57 in Petersburg
- East end: SR 257 near Otville

Eastern section
- Length: 15.359 mi (24.718 km)
- West end: US 31 near Scottsburg
- East end: SR 62 near Hanover

Location
- Country: United States
- State: Indiana
- Counties: Pike, Scott, Jefferson

Highway system
- Indiana State Highway System; Interstate; US; State; Scenic
← SR 352	→ SR 357

State Road 356 in the U.S. state of Indiana consists of two segments, both in the southern portion of the state. The western segment is about 10 miles long, and the eastern segment is about 15 miles long.

== Route description ==
=== Western section ===
The western segment SR 356 starts at an intersection with SR 57 in downtown Petersburg and travels eastward. The road travels through the east side of Petersburg before entering rural Pike County, traveling through farmland. SR 356 passes through Alford before crossing over Interstate 69 (I-69). After crossing I-69, SR 356 passes through Algiers before ending at a three-way junction with SR 257, northwest of Otwell.

=== Eastern section ===
The eastern section of SR 356 starts at a junction with US 31 west of Vienna and travels eastward. The road crosses the Louisville and Indiana Railroad before passing through Vienna. After Vienna SR 356 travels across farmland in Scott County before having a four-way intersection with SR 3. The highway continues east entering the town of Lexington. In downtown Lexington SR 356 has a short concurrency with SR 203 before leaving Lexington. East of Lexington SR 356 curves towards the northeast and enters Jefferson County. SR 356 ends at a three-way junction with SR 62, just south of the intersection between SR 56 and SR 62, a few miles west of Hanover, in rural Jefferson County.

== History ==
SR 356 was commissioned in 1932 routed between Lexington and SR 62. Between 1939 and 1941 the route was extended west to US 31, in Vienna. The western segment of SR 356, between SR 57 and SR 257 was also added to the state road system at this time. Both segment of SR 356 were paved around 1966.

== Major intersections ==
County	Location	mi	km	Destinations	Notes
Pike	Petersburg	0.000	0.000	SR 57 – Petersburg, Washington	Western terminus of SR 356
Pike	Jefferson Township	9.911	15.950	SR 257 – Otwell, Washington	Eastern terminus of the western section of SR 356
Gap in route
Scott	Vienna	9.912	15.952	US 31 – Sellersburg, Scottsburg	Western terminus of the eastern section of SR 356
Scott	Scott County	14.461	23.273	SR 3 – Charlestown, Vernon	
Scott	Lexington	17.952	28.891	SR 203 south	Western end of SR 203 concurrency
Scott	Lexington	18.113	29.150	SR 203 north	Eastern end of SR 203 concurrency
Jefferson	Hanover Township	25.270	40.668	SR 62 – Charlestown, Hanover, Madison	Eastern terminus of SR 356
1.000 mi = 1.609 km; 1.000 km = 0.621 mi: Concurrency terminus
