= Clay Township, Dearborn County, Indiana =

Clay Township
- Township
- Location of Clay Township in Dearborn County
- Coordinates: 39°00′44″N 85°03′35″W
- Country: United States
- State: Indiana
- County: Dearborn

Government
  - Type: Indiana township

Area
  - Total: 25.3 sq mi (66 km^{2})
  - Land: 25.25 sq mi (65.4 km^{2})
  - Water: 0.05 sq mi (0.13 km^{2})
- Elevation: 869 ft (265 m)

Population (2020)
  - Total: 2,844
  - Density: 117.5/sq mi (45.4/km^{2})
- FIPS code: 18-13024
- GNIS feature ID: 453207

Clay Township is one of fourteen townships in Dearborn County, Indiana. As of the 2010 census, its population was 2,966 and it contained 1,271 housing units.

== History ==
Clay Township was organized in 1835.

== Geography ==
According to the 2010 census, the township has a total area of 25.3 square miles (66 km^{2}), of which 25.25 square miles (65.4 km^{2}) (or 99.80%) is land and 0.05 square miles (0.13 km^{2}) (or 0.20%) is water.

=== Cities and towns ===
- Dillsboro

=== Major highways ===
- U.S. Route 50
- State Road 62
- State Road 262

=== Cemeteries ===
The township contains four cemeteries: Conaway, Oakdale, Spangler and Windsor.

== Education ==
Clay Township residents may obtain a library card at the Aurora Public Library in Aurora.
