= Indiana State Road 256 =

State highway in Indiana, United States

State Road 256
- SR 256 highlighted in red

Route information
- Maintained by INDOT
- Length: 26.678 mi (42.934 km)
- Existed: 1932–present

Major junctions
- West end: Old SR 39
- I-65 near Austin; US 31 near Austin
- East end: SR 56 / SR 62 near Madison

Location
- Country: United States
- State: Indiana
- Counties: Jackson, Jefferson, Scott, Washington

Highway system
- Indiana State Highway System; Interstate; US; State; Scenic
← SR 252	→ SR 257

State Road 256 (SR 256) in the U.S. state of Indiana runs mostly through Scott and Jefferson counties, with short portions in Jackson and Washington counties. The western terminus is Indiana 39. The eastern terminus is Indiana 56 near Madison.

== Route description ==
SR 256 heads east from its western terminus toward Austin. In Austin SR 256 has an interchange with Interstate 65 and then it has an intersection with U.S. Route 31. After Austin SR 256 has an intersection with State Road 203. Then SR 256 enters Jefferson County, where it has an intersection with State Road 3. Then SR 256 has an eastern terminus at an intersection with State Road 62 and State Road 56.

== Major intersections ==
County	Location	mi	km	Destinations	Notes
Washington	Gibson Township	0.000	0.000	Old SR 39	Western terminus of SR 256
Washington	Gibson Township	0.161	0.259	SR 39 – Little York, Brownstown	
Jackson	No major junctions				
Scott	Austin	6.371– 6.610	10.253– 10.638	I-65 – Indianapolis, Louisville	Exit number 34 on I-65
Scott	Austin	7.325	11.788	US 31 – Scottsburg, Seymour	
Scott	Johnson Township	12.564	20.220	SR 203 south – Lexington	Northern terminus of SR 203
Jefferson	Graham Township	15.562	25.045	SR 3 – Charlestown, North Vernon	
Jefferson	Madison Township	26.678	42.934	SR 56 / SR 62 – Charlestown, Madison	Eastern terminus of SR 256
1.000 mi = 1.609 km; 1.000 km = 0.621 mi
