= Indiana State Road 56 =

Highway in Indiana

State Road 56
- SR 56 highlighted in red

Route information
- Maintained by INDOT
- Length: 193.43 mi (311.30 km)
- Existed: October 1, 1926–present

Major junctions
- West end: US 41 at Hazleton
- I-69 Petersburg; US 231 in Jasper; US 150 near Paoli; I-65 in Scottsburg; US 31 in Scottsburg; US 421 in Madison
- East end: US 50 / SR 350 at Aurora

Location
- Country: United States
- State: Indiana
- Counties: Dearborn, Dubois, Gibson, Jefferson, Ohio, Orange, Pike, Scott, Switzerland, Washington

Highway system
- Indiana State Highway System; Interstate; US; State; Scenic
← SR 55	→ SR 57

State Road 56 in the U.S. state of Indiana is a route that travels the south central part of the state from west to east.

== Route description ==
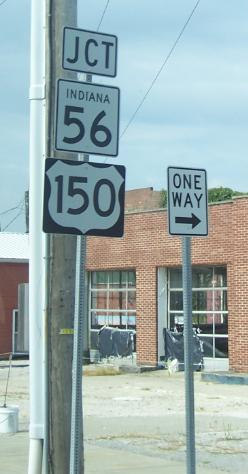
Signs for SR 56/US 150 in Paoli, seen from SR 37.

The western terminus of SR 56 is near Hazleton at U.S. Route 41. SR 56 heads northeast to Hazleton. After Hazleton SR 56 turns southeast then back northeast, until State Road 65 (SR 65). Where SR 56 heads east towards Petersburg, in Petersburg SR 56 is Concurrent with State Road 57 (SR 57), until the intersection with State Road 61 (SR 61). SR 56 leaves Petersburg concurrent with SR 61 heading south, until SR 56 turns east. South of Otwell SR 56 has an intersection with State Road 257. SR 56 enters Jasper on the west side and then has an intersection with U.S. Route 231, the two routes are concurrent until they leave Jasper on the north side of town. North of Jasper SR 56 turns east towards Paoli passing through French Lick. East of Paoli SR 56 heads towards Salem passing through an intersection with State Road 337 before passing by the entrance to Salem Speedway. SR 56 and State Road 60 have a concurrency from the west side of Salem to downtown Salem. SR 56 leaves Salem heading northeast, then turning east near the southern terminus of State Road 39 (SR 39). After SR 39, SR 56 passing over Interstate 65 (I-65). Then SR 56 enters Scottsburg where SR 56 has an intersection with U.S. Route 31. After leaving Scottsburg, SR 56 has a concurrency with State Road 203 and State Road 3. Then SR 56 heads toward Hanover where SR 56 and State Road 62 (SR 62) has a concurrency. East of Hanover SR 62 turns north and SR 56 heads east. East of the intersection with SR 62, SR 56 has an intersection with State Road 256 (SR 256). Then SR 56 enters Madison where SR 56 has an intersection with the southern terminus of State Road 7 and a concurrency with U.S. Route 421. East of Madison SR 56 parallels the Ohio River. Then in Vevay SR 56 has an intersection with the southern terminus of State Road 129 and the western terminus of State Road 156 (SR 156). After Vevay SR 56 heads north-northeast toward Aurora passing through intersection with State Road 250, SR 156, and State Road 262, passing through the town of Rising Sun. The northern terminus SR 56 is at an intersection with U.S. Route 50 and State Road 350.

== History ==
In the western part of Indiana SR 56 originally followed the same routing at current State Road 64 takes. In 1930 the east terminus of SR 56 was Lawrenceburg at U.S. Route 52, this route is now part of State Road 1.

East of US 231 in northeastern Dubois County, SR 56 approximates part of the course of the Buffalo Trace (road), a migration route for buffalo that provided a major avenue for travel by Native Americans and Europeans in what is now Southern Indiana.

== Major intersections ==
County	Location	mi	km	Destinations	Notes
Pike	Hazleton	0.00	0.00	US 41 – Evansville, Vincennes	Western terminus of SR 56
Pike	Clay Township	12.11	19.49	SR 65 south – Princeton	Northern terminus of SR 65
Pike	Petersburg	18.78	30.22	SR 57 south – Evansville	Western end of SR 57 concurrency
Pike	Petersburg	19.20	30.90	SR 57 north / SR 61 north – Vincennes, Washington	Eastern end of SR 57 concurrency; northern end of SR 61 concurrency
Pike	Petersburg			I-69 – Evansville, Indianapolis	
Pike	Washington Township	23.73	38.19	SR 61 south – Boonville	Southern end of SR 61 concurrency
Pike	Jefferson Township	32.14	51.72	SR 257 – Velpen, Otwell, Washington	
Dubois	Jasper	41.23	66.35	US 231 south – Dale, Huntingburg	Southern end of US 231 concurrency
Dubois	Jasper			SR 164 east to SR 162 – Ferdinand	Western terminus of SR 164
Dubois	Harbison Township	48.46	77.99	US 231 north – Loogootee	Northern end of US 231 concurrency
Dubois	Harbison Township	54.36	87.48	SR 545 south – Dubois	Northern terminus of SR 545
Orange	French Lick	66.92	107.70	SR 145 south	Northern terminus of SR 145
Orange	West Baden Springs	68.80	110.72	US 150 west – Loogootee	Western end of US 150 concurrency
Orange	Paoli			SR 37 south – Tell City	Western end of SR 37 concurrency
Orange	Paoli			SR 37 north – Orleans, Mitchell, Bedford	Eastern end of SR 37 concurrency
Orange	Paoli	77.80	125.21	US 150 east – Fredericksburg	Eastern end of US 150 concurrency
Washington	Livonia	87.84	141.36	SR 337 north – Orleans	Southern terminus of SR 337
Washington	Salem	97.58	157.04	SR 60 west – Mitchell	Western terminus of SR 60 concurrency
Washington	Salem	99.04	159.39	SR 60 east / SR 135 – Sellersburg, Corydon, Brownstown	Eastern terminus of SR 60 concurrency
Washington	Gibson Township	111.95	180.17	SR 39 north – Little York	Southern terminus of SR 39
Scott	Scottsburg	117.47	189.05	I-65 – Indianapolis, Louisville	Exit 29 on I-65
Scott	Scottsburg	118.00	189.90	US 31 – Jeffersonville, Columbus	
Scott	Lexington Township	121.70	195.86	SR 203 north	Western terminus of SR 203 concurrency
Scott	Lexington Township	122.68	197.43	SR 3 south – Charlestown	Western terminus of SR 3 concurrency
Scott	Lexington Township	124.40	200.20	SR 203 south – Lexington	Eastern end of SR 203 concurrency
Scott	Lexington Township	125.70	202.29	SR 3 north – Vernon	Eastern end of SR 3 concurrency
Jefferson	Hanover Township	132.75	213.64	SR 62 west – New Washington, Jeffersonville	Western end of SR 62 concurrency
Jefferson	Hanover	137.99	222.07	SR 256 west – Austin	Eastern terminus of SR 256
Jefferson	Madison	141.02	226.95	SR 7 north – Vernon	
Jefferson	Madison	141.90	228.37	US 421 north / SR 62 east – Versailles, Dillsboro	Roundabout; Eastern end of SR 62 concurrency and northern end of US 421 concurrency
Jefferson	Madison	142.18	228.82	US 421 south - Frankfort	Southern end of US 421 concurrency
Switzerland	Vevay	160.37	258.09	SR 129 north – Versailles	Southern terminus of SR 129
Switzerland	Vevay			SR 156 east – Florence	Western terminus of SR 156
Switzerland	Cotton Township	173.22	278.77	SR 250	
Ohio	Randolph Township	182.18	293.19	SR 156 west – Florence	Eastern terminus of SR 156
Ohio	Rising Sun	184.78	297.37	SR 262 west – Dillsboro	Eastern terminus of SR 262
Dearborn	Aurora	193.43	311.30	US 50 / SR 350 west – Dillsboro, Milan, Lawrenceburg	Eastern terminus of SR 56
1.000 mi = 1.609 km; 1.000 km = 0.621 mi: Concurrency terminus
