= Blocher =

Blocher may refer to:

- Blocher (surname)
- Blocher, Indiana, an unincorporated town
- Blocher's Run, a stream in the U.S. state of Pennsylvania
