= Nabb =

Nabb or NABB may refer to:

- Nabb, Indiana, an unincorporated community in the United States
- Nationwide Association of Blood Bikes

== People with the surname ==
- Carl-Gustaf Nabb (born 1936), Finnish footballer
- Magdalen Nabb (1947–2007), British author
