= Monroe Township, Clark County, Indiana =

Monroe Township
- Township
- Location of Monroe Township in Clark County
- Coordinates: 38°32′41″N 85°46′25″W
- Country: United States
- State: Indiana
- County: Clark

Government
  - Type: Indiana township

Area
  - Total: 56.06 sq mi (145.2 km^{2})
  - Land: 55.78 sq mi (144.5 km^{2})
  - Water: 0.28 sq mi (0.73 km^{2})
- Elevation: 520 ft (160 m)

Population (2020)
  - Total: 5,610
  - Density: 96.9/sq mi (37.4/km^{2})
- FIPS code: 18-50274
- GNIS feature ID: 453636

Monroe Township is one of twelve townships in Clark County, Indiana. As of the 2010 census, its population was 5,402 and it contained 2,125 housing units.

== History ==
Monroe Township was organized prior to 1827 but the exact date is unclear because records have been lost. It was likely named for President James Monroe.

== Geography ==
According to the 2010 census, the township has a total area of 56.06 square miles (145.2 km^{2}), of which 55.78 square miles (144.5 km^{2}) (or 99.50%) is land and 0.28 square miles (0.73 km^{2}) (or 0.50%) is water.

=== Unincorporated towns ===
- Blue Lick
- Henryville
- Underwood

=== Adjacent townships ===
- Vienna Township, Scott County (north)
- Oregon Township (east)
- Charlestown Township (southeast)
- Union Township (south)
- Carr Township (southwest)
- Wood Township (southwest)
- Polk Township, Washington County (west)
- Finley Township, Scott County (northwest)

=== Major highways ===
- Interstate 65
- U.S. Route 31
- State Road 160

=== Cemeteries ===
The township contains several cemeteries: Blue Lick Cemetery (a.k.a. Mountain Grove), Bowerman Cemetery, Cass, Clegg (a.k.a. Mt. Moriah), Collings, Dieterlen Grave, Dietz, Forest Grove (a.k.a. Willey's Chapel), Guernsey, Henryville, Hylton-Condrey, Hosea Family, Kaylor-Wilcox, Little Union (a.k.a. Gross), McBride-Allen-Biggs (a.k.a. Allen), Mt. Lebanon, Mt. Moriah, Mt. Zion, Otisco II, St. Clair, St. Francis Catholic (a.k.a. Henryville Catholic), Tuttle, and Wootan.
