= List of Indiana state lakes =

Indiana state lakes are listed below, with the county in which each lake's main entrance is located.

== List ==
Name	Location (of main entrance)
Brookville Lake	Franklin County
Cagles Mill Lake	Putnam County
Cecil Harden Lake	Parke County
Hardy Lake	Scott County
Mississinewa Lake	Wabash County
Monroe Lake	Monroe County
Patoka Lake	Crawford County
Salamonie Lake	Huntington County

== See also ==
- List of Indiana state parks
- List of national forests of the United States
