= Oregon Township, Clark County, Indiana =

Oregon Township
- Township
- Location of Oregon Township in Clark County
- Coordinates: 38°33′02″N 85°38′28″W
- Country: United States
- State: Indiana
- County: Clark

Government
  - Type: Indiana township

Area
  - Total: 31.27 sq mi (81.0 km^{2})
  - Land: 31.08 sq mi (80.5 km^{2})
  - Water: 0.19 sq mi (0.49 km^{2})
- Elevation: 666 ft (203 m)

Population (2020)
  - Total: 1,753
  - Density: 56.9/sq mi (22.0/km^{2})
- FIPS code: 18-56898
- GNIS feature ID: 453693

Oregon Township is one of twelve townships in Clark County, Indiana. As of the 2010 census, its population was 1,769 and it contained 692 housing units.

== History ==
Oregon Township was organized in 1852. Oregon Township was purportedly so named because at the time of the township's organization, it was sparsely inhabited and considered as remote as the Oregon Territory.

== Geography ==
According to the 2010 census, the township has a total area of 31.27 square miles (81.0 km^{2}), of which 31.08 square miles (80.5 km^{2}) (or 99.39%) is land and 0.19 square miles (0.49 km^{2}) (or 0.61%) is water.

=== Unincorporated towns ===
- Marysville
- New Market

(This list is based on USGS data and may include former settlements.)

=== Adjacent townships ===
- Lexington Township, Scott County (north)
- Washington Township (east)
- Owen Township (southeast)
- Charlestown Township (south)
- Monroe Township (west)
- Vienna Township, Scott County (northwest)

=== Major highways ===
- Indiana State Road 3
- Indiana State Road 203
- Indiana State Road 362

=== Cemeteries ===
The township contains several cemeteries: Beswick (aka Walnut Hill), Covert, Emmanuel United Methodist Church, Goben, Hebron, Kern, Otisco, New Market Christian Church, New Market Presbyterian Church (aka Mt. Vernon), Sawmill Road, States, and Webb Farm.
