= Owen Township, Indiana =

Owen Township is the name of four townships in Indiana:

- Owen Township, Clark County, Indiana
- Owen Township, Clinton County, Indiana
- Owen Township, Jackson County, Indiana
- Owen Township, Warrick County, Indiana
