= Hibernia, Indiana =

Hibernia is the name of the following places in the U.S. state of Indiana:

- Hibernia, Clark County, Indiana
