= Indiana State Road 129 =

Highway in Indiana

State Road 129
- SR 129 highlighted in red

Route information
- Maintained by INDOT
- Length: 48.008 mi (77.261 km)

Major junctions
- South end: SR 56 near Vevay
- North end: SR 46 near Batesville

Location
- Country: United States
- State: Indiana
- Counties: Switzerland, Ripley

Highway system
- Indiana State Highway System; Interstate; US; State; Scenic
← SR 128	→ SR 130

State Road 129 (SR 129) is a part of the Indiana State Road that runs between Vevay and Batesville in the US state of Indiana. The 31.78 miles (51.14 km) of SR 129 that lie within Indiana serve as a minor highway. Some of the highway is listed on the National Highway System. Various sections are urban two-lane highway and rural two-lane highway. The highway passes through residential and commercial properties.

== Route description ==
SR 129 begins at SR 56 on the banks of the Ohio River on the west side of Vevay. The route heads northwest as a two-lane rural highway, passing through farmland and woodland. The route has an intersection with SR 250, in rural Switzerland County. The highway crosses into Ripley County and begins a concurrency with SR 62. The concurrency heads north-northeast passing through Cross Plains. North of Cross Plains, SR 62 turns east and SR 129 keeps heading north-northwest. The road enters Versailles from the southeast and begins a concurrency with U.S. Route 421 (US 421). The two routes head north towards downtown Versailles and US 50. At US 50, the concurrency with US 421 ends when it heads east concurrent with US 50. SR 129 heads east concurrent with US 50 and leaves town, entering Versailles State Park. After passing through Versailles State Park, the concurrency endS when SR 129 turns north towards Batesville. The highway enters Batesville and ends at an intersection with SR 46.

The only segment of State Road 129 in Indiana that is included in the National Highway System (NHS), is that concurrent with US 50. The NHS is a network of highways that are identified as being most important for the economy, mobility and defense of the nation. The highway is maintained by the Indiana Department of Transportation (INDOT) like all other state roads in the state. The department tracks the traffic volumes along all state roads as a part of its maintenance responsibilities using a metric called average annual daily traffic (AADT). This measurement is a calculation of the traffic level along a segment of roadway for any average day of the year. In 2010, INDOT figured that lowest traffic levels were 1,290 vehicles and 270 commercial vehicles used the highway daily near the intersection with SR 250. The peak traffic volumes were 10,190 vehicles and 610 commercial vehicles AADT along the section of SR 129 at is concurrent with US 421.

== History ==
In 1930 the Indiana State Highway Commission authorized a state road from SR 56 near Vevay to Versailles. This state road was designated as SR 129 in 1931. Paving of the original section was completed between 1965 and 1967. Around 1977 the SR 129 designation was extended north from Versailles to SR 48. The route was extended north again from SR 48 to SR 46 in Batesville between 1990 and 1991.

== Major intersections ==
County	Location	mi	km	Destinations	Notes
Switzerland	Vevay	0.000	0.000	SR 56 – Madison, Vevay	Southern terminus of SR 129
Switzerland	Pleasant Township	12.119	19.504	SR 250	
Ripley	Brown Township	16.378	26.358	SR 62 west – Hanover	Southern end of SR 62 concurrency
Ripley	Brown Township	18.837	30.315	SR 62 east – Dillsboro	Northern end of SR 62 concurrency
Ripley	Versailles	27.718	44.608	US 421 south – Madison	Southern end of US 421 concurrency
Ripley	Versailles	28.178	45.348	US 50 west / US 421 north – North Vernon, Greensburg	Northern end of SR 421 concurrency; western end of US 50 concurrency
Ripley	Johnson–Washington township line	32.110	51.676	US 50 east – Lawrenceburg	Eastern end of US 50 concurrency
Ripley	Delaware Township	39.117	62.953	SR 350 – Osgood, Aurora	
Ripley	Delaware Township	42.294	68.066	SR 48 – Napoleon, Lawrenceburg	
Ripley	Batesville	48.008	77.261	SR 46 to SR 229 – Batesville	Northern terminus of SR 129
1.000 mi = 1.609 km; 1.000 km = 0.621 mi: Concurrency terminus

== See also ==
- State Road 29
- State Road 229
- State Road 329
