= Wooster, Scott County, Indiana =

Wooster
- Unincorporated community
- Location within Indiana Location within the United States
- Coordinates: 38°44′12″N 85°41′34″W
- Country: United States
- State: Indiana
- County: Scott
- Township: Johnson
- Elevation: 669 ft (204 m)
- Time zone: UTC-5 (Eastern (EST))
  - Summer (DST): UTC-4 (EDT)
- ZIP code: 47170
- Area codes: 812, 930
- GNIS feature ID: 446327

Wooster is an unincorporated community in Johnson Township, Scott County, in the U.S. state of Indiana.

== History ==
An old variant name of the community was called Woostertown. A post office called Woostertown was established in 1861, and remained in operation until 1875. The community's name is derived from Worcester, Massachusetts, according to local history.
