= Leota =

Leota may refer to:

== Places ==
- Leota, Indiana
- Leota, Michigan
- Leota, Missouri
- Leota Township, Nobles County, Minnesota

== People ==
- Eku Leota (born 1999), American football player
- Trevor Leota (born 1975), former Samoan rugby player
- Leota Adebayo, fictional character in the DCEU
