= Albion, Scott County, Indiana =

Albion
- Unincorporated community
- Location within Indiana Location within the United States
- Coordinates: 38°44′37″N 85°44′03″W
- Country: United States
- State: Indiana
- County: Scott
- Township: Johnson
- Elevation: 630 ft (190 m)
- Time zone: UTC-5 (Eastern (EST))
  - Summer (DST): UTC-4 (EDT)
- ZIP code: 47102
- Area codes: 812, 930
- GNIS feature ID: 430043

Albion is an unincorporated community in Johnson Township, Scott County, in the U.S. state of Indiana.

== History ==
Albion was laid out in 1837. The community's name Albion is an old term meaning Great Britain.
