= Cedar Cliffs Park =

Park in Indiana, United States

Coordinates: 38.7367°N 85.3458°W

Cedar Cliffs Park is a park in Jefferson County, Indiana, on the northern shore of the Ohio River, overlooking Trimble County, Kentucky. The park is on the north side Indiana State Road 56 just east of the town of Madison, Indiana.
