= Dillsboro =

Dillsboro is the name of two places in the United States:

- Dillsboro, Indiana
- Dillsboro, North Carolina
