= Indiana State Road 262 =

State highway in Indiana, United States

State Road 262
- SR 262 highlighted in red

Route information
- Maintained by INDOT
- Length: 14.909 mi (23.994 km)
- Existed: 1932–present

Major junctions
- West end: US 50 at Dillsboro
- East end: SR 56 at Rising Sun

Location
- Country: United States
- State: Indiana
- Counties: Dearborn, Ohio

Highway system
- Indiana State Highway System; Interstate; US; State; Scenic
← SR 261	→ SR 263

State Road 262 (SR 262) is a state road in the south-eastern section of the state of Indiana. Running for roughly 15 miles (24 km) in a general northwest–southeast direction, it connects the towns of Dillsboro and Rising Sun. SR 262 was originally introduced in the early-1930s routed between along its modern routing. The road was paved in the mid to late 1960s. The road serves as the eastern terminus of its primary route, Indiana 62 just east of Dillsboro.

== Route description ==
SR 262 begins at US 50 near Dillsboro in Dearborn County. Going south, it crosses SR 62 after only a few hundred feet, then runs southeast. After a few miles, it descends into the Laughery Creek Valley, crossing the creek into Ohio County. After turning eastward and passing through the unincorporated community of Milton, it ascends out of the valley. Both the approach and departure of the valley are fairly hazardous, with sharp curves and steep dropoffs. At about 7 miles, it reaches the top of the ridge, where the road straightens out for a distance of a mile. The western end of this stretch is marked by a four-way intersection in the unincorporated community of Pate, with Woods Ridge Road headed north, while Cass-Union Road heading south to SR 56 in Aberdeen. SR 262 then passes through a four-way stop in Cofield Corner with Salem Ridge Road headed north east, and Palmer Road headed south. The road then descends into the Arnold Creek Valley, which is also a curvy stretch of road, but lacks the steep dropoffs of the Laughery Creek section. The road enters the town of Rising Sun following Main Street, passing through a residential area of town. SR 262 terminates at an intersection between Main Street and High Street (SR 56) in the town. SR 56 turns onto Main Street for one block, before turning south and continuing towards Vevay and Madison. Indiana Department of Transportation surveys in 2015 showed that the highest traffic levels along SR 262 were the 3,352 vehicles daily in the Rising Sun; the lowest count was 514 vehicles per day in the area of Hartford Pike.

== History ==
The Indiana State Highway Commission designated SR 262 in 1932. The original routing started at US 50 in Dillsboro and ran southeast to SR 56 in Rising Sun much as it does today. The entire route of SR 262 was paved between 1966 and 1967. The last major change to SR 262 happen between 1969 and 1970 and it was a short addition north to the new four-lane US 50 in Dillsboro. The routing has remained unchanged since

== Major intersections ==
County	Location	mi	km	Destinations	Notes
Dearborn	Dillsboro	0.000	0.000	US 50 – Versailles, Aurora	Western terminus of SR 262
Dearborn	Dillsboro	0.127	0.204	SR 62 west – Dillsboro, Friendship	Eastern terminus of SR 62
Ohio	Rising Sun	14.909	23.994	SR 56 to SR 156	Eastern terminus of SR 262
1.000 mi = 1.609 km; 1.000 km = 0.621 mi
