= New Frankfort, Indiana =

- Unincorporated community
- Location within Indiana Location within the United States
- Coordinates: 38°44′12″N 85°42′40″W
- Country: United States
- State: Indiana
- County: Scott
- Township: Johnson
- Elevation: 633 ft (193 m)
- Time zone: UTC-5 (Eastern (EST))
  - Summer (DST): UTC-4 (EDT)
- ZIP code: 47170
- Area codes: 812, 930
- GNIS feature ID: 440047

New Frankfort is an unincorporated community in Johnson Township, Scott County, in the U.S. state of Indiana.

== History ==
New Frankfort was founded in 1838, and named after Frankfort, Kentucky, the native home of a large share of the early settlers.

A post office was established at New Frankfort in 1838, and remained in operation until it was discontinued in 1901.
