= Owen Township, Clark County, Indiana =

Owen Township
- Township
- Location of Owen Township in Clark County
- Coordinates: 38°30′01″N 85°31′29″W
- Country: United States
- State: Indiana
- County: Clark

Government
  - Type: Indiana township

Area
  - Total: 17.35 sq mi (44.9 km^{2})
  - Land: 17.07 sq mi (44.2 km^{2})
  - Water: 0.28 sq mi (0.73 km^{2})
- Elevation: 719 ft (219 m)

Population (2020)
  - Total: 916
  - Density: 56.1/sq mi (21.7/km^{2})
- FIPS code: 18-57438
- GNIS feature ID: 453700

Owen Township is one of twelve townships in Clark County, Indiana. As of the 2010 census, its population was 958 and it contained 462 housing units.

== History ==
Owen Township was established around 1830. It was named after John Owen, a county commissioner.

== Geography ==
According to the 2010 census, the township has a total area of 17.35 square miles (44.9 km^{2}), of which 17.07 square miles (44.2 km^{2}) (or 98.39%) is land and 0.28 square miles (0.73 km^{2}) (or 1.61%) is water.

=== Unincorporated towns ===
- Hibernia
- Sunset Village

(This list is based on USGS data and may include former settlements.)

=== Adjacent townships ===
- Washington Township (north)
- Bethlehem Township (northeast)
- Charlestown Township (west)
- Oregon Township (northwest)

=== Major highways ===
- Indiana State Road 62

=== Cemeteries ===
The township contains several cemeteries: Bowyer (a.k.a. Hogan), Conn, Hibernia, Hogan, Manaugh, Olive Branch, Owen Creek Presbyterian/Baptist Church, Perry, Pleasant View, Shiloh (a.k.a. Owen Township)
