= Underwood, Indiana =

Unincorporated town in Indiana, United States

Underwood
- Unincorporated town and Census-designated place
- Clark County's location in Indiana

- Location in Clark County
- Coordinates: 38°36′13.22″N 85°46′27.88″W
- Country: United States
- State: Indiana
- County: Clark
- Township: Monroe
- Elevation: 594 ft (181 m)
- ZIP code: 47177
- FIPS code: 18-77084
- GNIS feature ID: 445042

Underwood is an unincorporated town in Monroe Township, Clark County, Indiana, United States. It took its name from the local Underwood family.

As a newly established Census-designated place, it does not have data in the 2020 census. The 2022 American Community Survey, estimated a population of around 1,000 residents.

== Demographics ==
Historical population
Census	Pop.	Note	%±
2023 (est.)	1,140

The United States Census Bureau defined Underwood as a census designated place in the 2022 American Community Survey.
