= Washington Township, Clark County, Indiana =

Washington Township
- Township
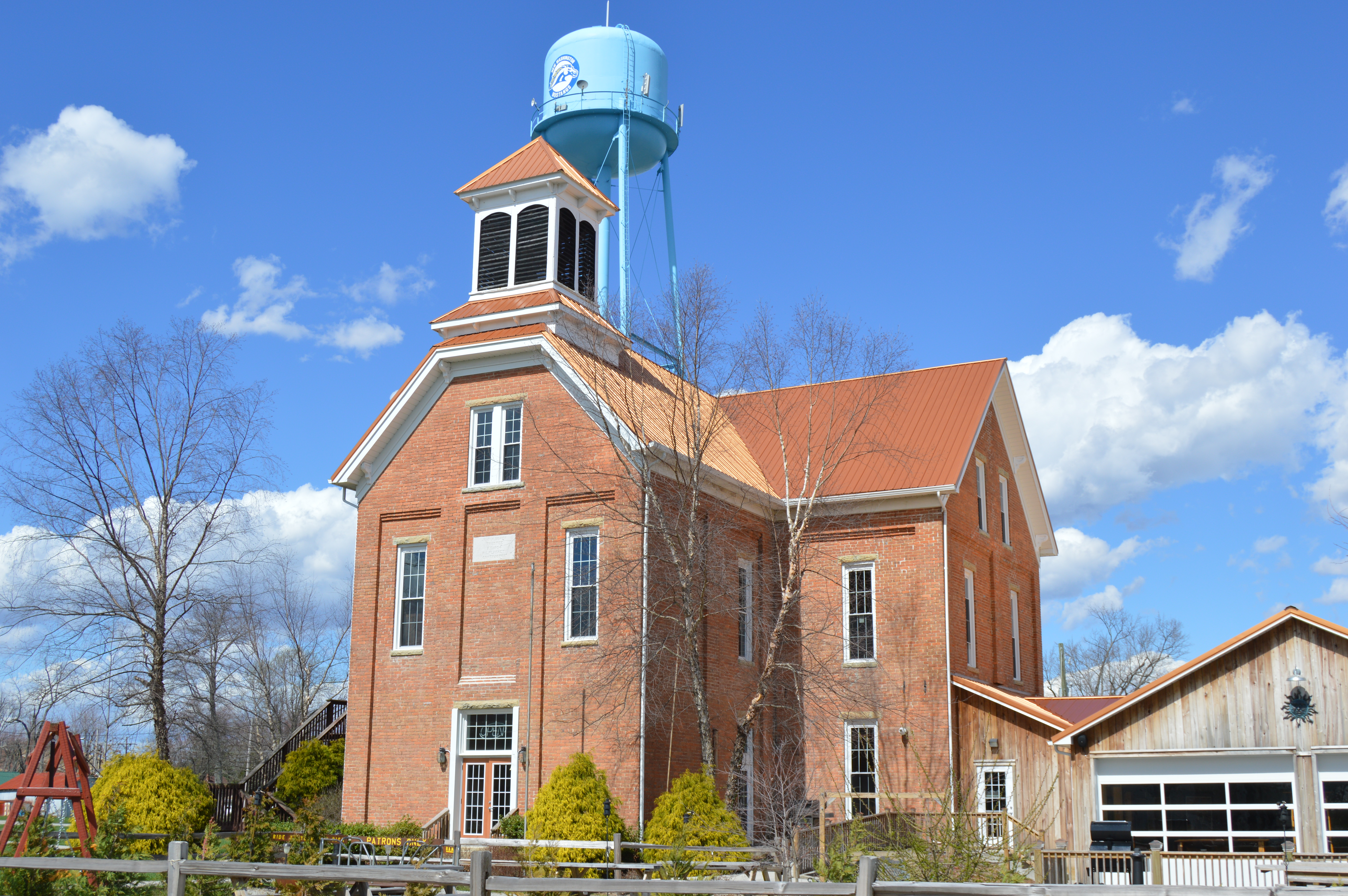
- Scene in New Washington

- Location of Washington Township in Clark County
- Coordinates: 38°33′57″N 85°33′27″W
- Country: United States
- State: Indiana
- County: Clark

Government
  - Type: Indiana township

Area
  - Total: 35.29 sq mi (91.4 km^{2})
  - Land: 35.19 sq mi (91.1 km^{2})
  - Water: 0.09 sq mi (0.23 km^{2})
- Elevation: 702 ft (214 m)

Population (2020)
  - Total: 1,706
  - Density: 48.4/sq mi (18.7/km^{2})
- FIPS code: 18-80450
- GNIS feature ID: 453987

Washington Township is one of twelve townships in Clark County, Indiana. As of the 2010 census, its population was 1,702 and it contained 744 housing units.

== History ==
Washington Township was organized in 1816.

== Geography ==
According to the 2010 census, the township has a total area of 35.29 square miles (91.4 km^{2}), of which 35.19 square miles (91.1 km^{2}) (or 99.72%) is land and 0.09 square miles (0.23 km^{2}) (or 0.26%) is water.

=== Cities and towns ===
- New Washington

=== Unincorporated towns ===
- Nabb

=== Adjacent townships ===
- Saluda Township, Jefferson County (northeast)
- Bethlehem Township (east)
- Owen Township (south)
- Oregon Township (west)
- Lexington Township, Scott County (northwest)

=== Major highways ===
- Indiana State Road 62
- Indiana State Road 362

=== Cemeteries ===
The township contains several cemeteries: Adams (a.k.a. Fifer), Barnes, Barnes Community House, Britain Cemetery (a.k.a. Pisgah), Crown Hill, Fouts/Robison, Frazier Family, Glass Family, Grayfriar-McMillen, Lawrence, Izzard, New Washington Christian Church, Staples, Work (a.k.a. Bower-Work Henly-Work)
