= Sunset Village, Indiana =

Unincorporated community in Indiana, United States

Sunset Village
- Unincorporated community
- Clark County's location in Indiana

- Location in Clark County
- Coordinates: 38°27′25″N 85°32′04″W
- Country: United States
- State: Indiana
- County: Clark
- Township: Owen
- Elevation: 443 ft (135 m)
- ZIP code: 47111
- FIPS code: 18-74348
- GNIS feature ID: 444432

Sunset Village is an unincorporated community in Owen Township, Clark County, Indiana, United States.
