= Indiana State Road 403 =

State highway in Indiana, United States

State Road 403
- County Road 403

Route information
- Maintained by INDOT
- Length: 5.54 mi (8.92 km)
- Existed: 1932–September 2012

Major junctions
- South end: US 31
- North end: SR 3

Location
- Country: United States
- State: Indiana
- Counties: Clark

Highway system
- Indiana State Highway System; Interstate; US; State; Scenic
← SR 364	→ SR 427

State Road 403 (SR 403), now known as County Road 403, is a six-mile (10 km) northeast-to-southwest route that lies entirely within Clark County.

== Route description ==
County Road 403 begins in the north end of Sellersburg at U.S. Route 31, just south of the community of Speed. The road runs northeast in a straight line toward central Charlestown where it intersects with State Road 160 at that road's eastern terminus. The road terminates at State Road 3 about 300 feet further to the northeast.

== History ==
In September 2012, the entire length of SR 403 was decommissioned as a State Highway and taken over by Clark County.

== Major intersections ==
The entire route is in Clark County.

Location	mi	km	Destinations	Notes
Sellersburg	0.00	0.00	US 31 – Sellersburg, Scottsburg	Western terminus of SR 403
Charlestown	5.45	8.77	SR 160 west – Henryville	Eastern terminus of SR 160
Charlestown	5.54	8.92	SR 3 – Vernon	Eastern terminus of SR 403
1.000 mi = 1.609 km; 1.000 km = 0.621 mi
