= Blocher, Indiana =

- Unincorporated community and census-designated place
- Location within Indiana Location within the United States
- Coordinates: 38°43′13″N 85°39′19″W
- Country: United States
- State: Indiana
- County: Scott
- Township: Johnson
- Elevation: 686 ft (209 m)
- Time zone: UTC-5 (Eastern (EST))
  - Summer (DST): UTC-4 (EDT)
- ZIP code: 47138
- Area codes: 812, 930
- FIPS code: 18-5680
- GNIS feature ID: 2830524

Blocher is a census-designated place in Johnson Township, Scott County, in the U.S. state of Indiana.

== History ==
Blocher was founded in 1860 by Daniel Blocher. An old variant name of the community was called Holman Station.

A post office was established under the name Holman Station in 1870, was renamed Blocher in 1888, and operated until it was discontinued in 1965.

== Demographics ==
The United States Census Bureau delineated Blocher as a census designated place in the 2022 American Community Survey.
