= New Washington, Indiana =

- CDP
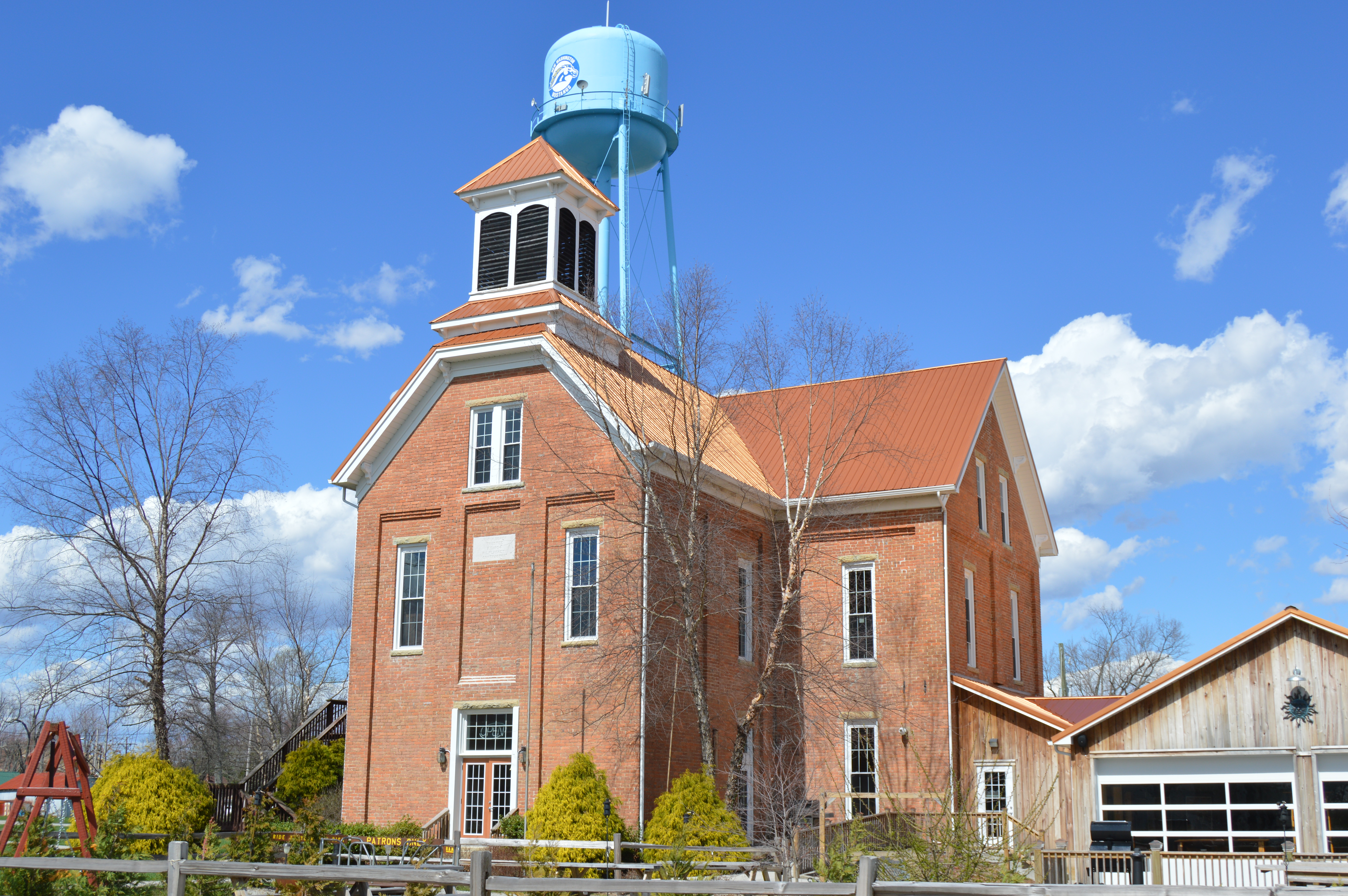
- Former school

- Location of New Washington in Clark County, Indiana.
- Coordinates: 38°33′56″N 85°32′46″W
- Country: United States
- State: Indiana
- County: Clark
- Township: Washington

Area
  - Total: 5.22 sq mi (13.52 km^{2})
  - Land: 5.21 sq mi (13.49 km^{2})
  - Water: 0.015 sq mi (0.04 km^{2})
- Elevation: 715 ft (218 m)

Population (2020)
  - Total: 595
  - Density: 114.2/sq mi (44.11/km^{2})
- Time zone: UTC-5 (Eastern (EST))
  - Summer (DST): UTC-4 (EDT)
- ZIP code: 47162
- Area code: 812
- FIPS code: 18-53820
- GNIS feature ID: 2393150

New Washington is a census-designated place (CDP) in Clark County, Indiana, United States. As of the 2020 census, New Washington had a population of 595.

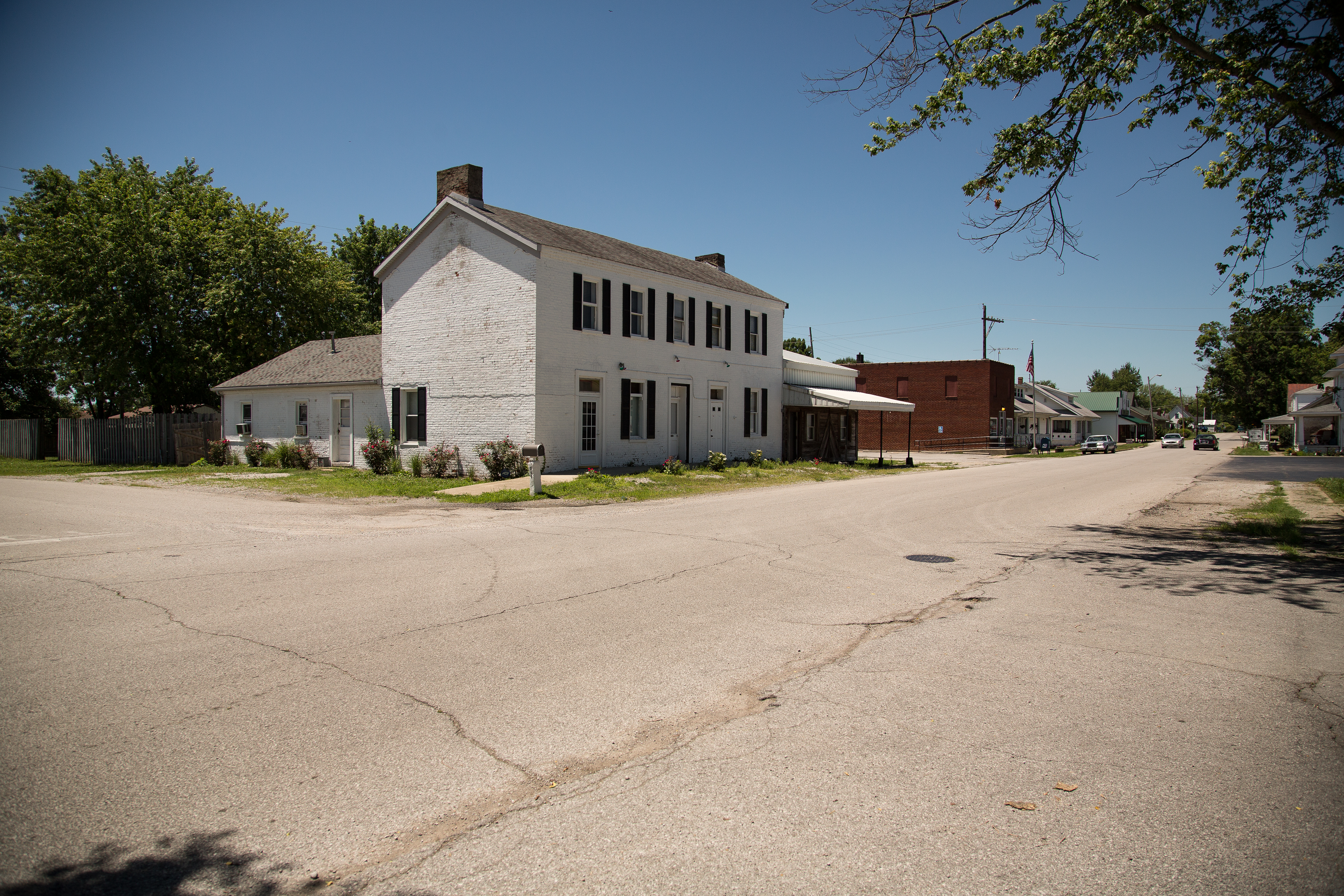
Photo from Small Town Indiana photo survey.

== History ==
New Washington was established in 1815. A post office was established at New Washington in 1819.

New Washington was the closest community to the now-defunct Marble Hill Nuclear Power Plant.

== Geography ==
New Washington is located in northeastern Clark County. Indiana State Road 62 runs through the center of the community, leading north then east 19 miles (31 km) to Madison and southwest 24 miles (39 km) to Jeffersonville across the Ohio River from Louisville, Kentucky.

According to the United States Census Bureau, the CDP has a total area of 5.2 square miles (13.5 km^{2}), of which 0.02 square miles (0.04 km^{2}), or 0.29%, is water.

== Demographics ==
Historical population
Census	Pop.	Note	%±
2020	595		—
U.S. Decennial Census

As of the census of 2000, there were 547 people, 228 households, and 163 families residing in the CDP. The population density was 104.8 inhabitants per square mile (40.5/km^{2}). There were 253 housing units at an average density of 48.5 per square mile (18.7/km^{2}). The racial makeup of the CDP was 99.63% White and 0.37% African American.

There were 229 households, out of which 27.6% had children under the age of 18 living with them, 58.8% were married couples living together, 10.5% had a female householder with no husband present, and 28.5% were non-families. 25.0% of all households were made up of individuals, and 12.7% had someone living alone who was 65 years of age or older. The average household size was 2.38 and the average family size was 2.85.

In the CDP the population was spread out, with 20.7% under the age of 18, 10.1% from 18 to 24, 26.7% from 25 to 44, 26.7% from 45 to 64, and 15.9% who were 65 years of age or older. The median age was 40 years. For every 100 females, there were 85.4 males. For every 100 females age 18 and over, there were 79.3 males.

The median income for a household in the CDP was $37,368, and the median income for a family was $42,292. Males had a median income of $31,359 versus $14,750 for females. The per capita income for the CDP was $19,343. About 2.3% of families and 8.2% of the population were below the poverty line, including 18.3% of those under age 18 and 16.9% of those age 65 or over.

== Education ==
New Washington has a public library, elementary school, middle/high school, and a branch of the Charlestown-Clark County Public Library.
