= Carl-Gustaf Nabb =

Finnish footballer (born 1936)

Personal information
- Date of birth: 9 September 1936 (age 90)

International career
Years	Team	Apps	(Gls)
1960–1961	Finland	3	(0)

Carl-Gustaf Nabb (born 9 September 1936) is a Finnish footballer. He played in three matches for the Finland national football team in 1960 and 1961.
