= Marysville, Indiana =

Unincorporated community in Indiana, United States

Marysville
- Unincorporated community
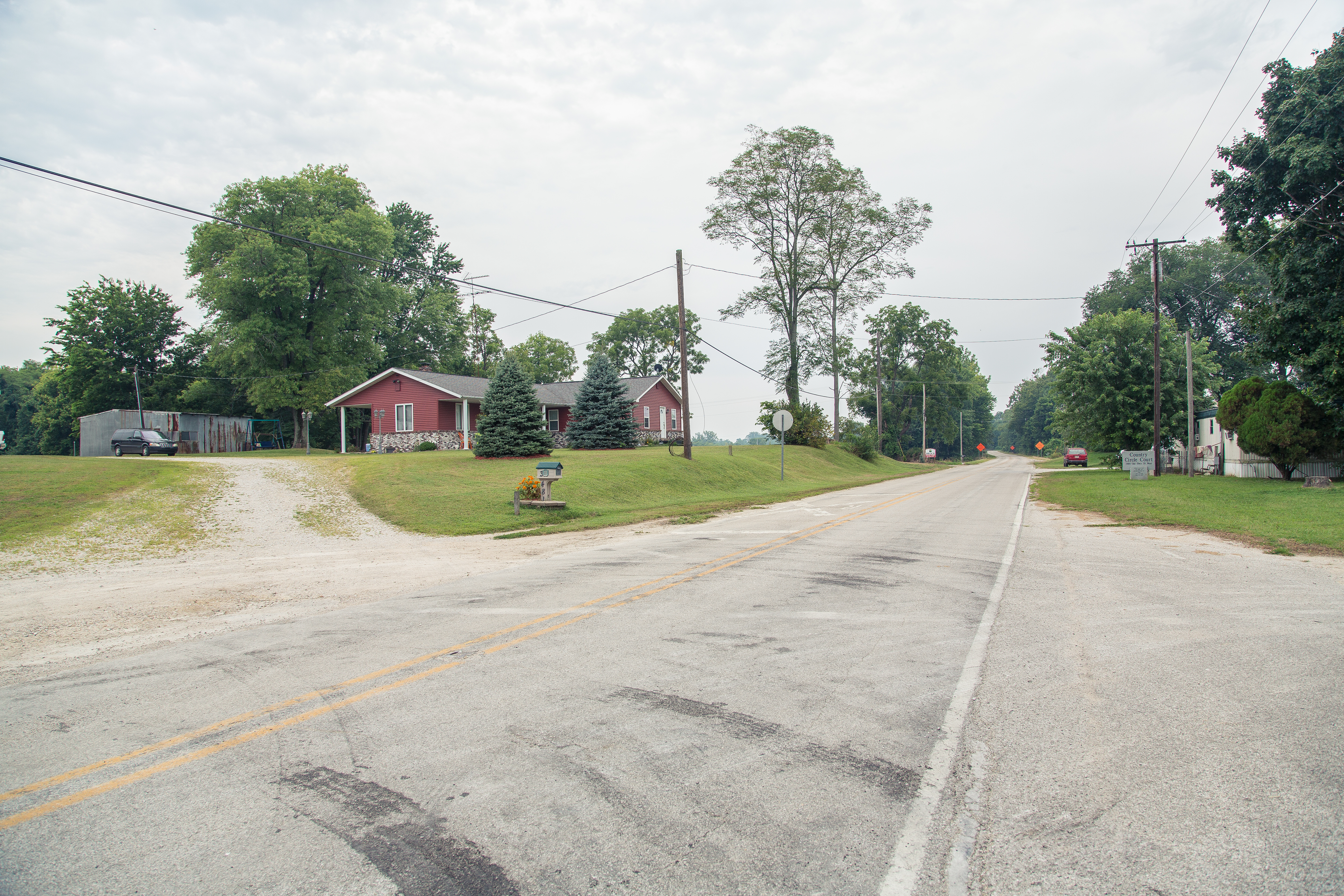
- A Road in Marysville

- Location within Indiana Location within the United States
- Coordinates: 38°35′08″N 85°38′37″W
- Country: United States
- State: Indiana
- County: Clark
- Township: Oregon
- Elevation: 712 ft (217 m)
- ZIP code: 47141
- FIPS code: 18-47502
- GNIS feature ID: 438691

Marysville is an unincorporated community in Oregon Township, Clark County, Indiana.

== History ==
The town was laid out with 40 lots along the railroad tracks in 1871. It was named for Mary Kimberlain, a local resident.

The town suffered severe damage due to an EF-4 tornado on March 2, 2012. Major Chuck Adams of the Clark County Sheriff's Department described the town as "completely gone." The 1891 Marysville Christian Church was blown four feet off its foundation. As reported in the Los Angeles Times, pastor Bob Priest stated: "We recognize that the church is not the building and we can rebuild the building. I hope to build bigger and better." Of the 40 to 50 houses in the town, many but not all were damaged beyond repair.
