= Blocher (surname) =

The surname Blocher or Blöcher may refer to:

- Christoph Blocher (born 1940), Swiss politician and industrialist
- Henri Blocher (born 1937), French evangelical theologian
- Stefan Blöcher (born 1960), field hockey player
- William Durbin Blocher, commander of Blocher's Battery in American Civil War
