= Finley Township, Scott County, Indiana =

Finley Township
- Township
- Coordinates: 38°38′53″N 85°51′08″W
- Country: United States
- State: Indiana
- County: Scott

Government
  - Type: Indiana township

Area
  - Total: 39.62 sq mi (102.6 km^{2})
  - Land: 39.35 sq mi (101.9 km^{2})
  - Water: 0.27 sq mi (0.70 km^{2})
- Elevation: 620 ft (190 m)

Population (2020)
  - Total: 1,489
  - Density: 37.3/sq mi (14.4/km^{2})
- FIPS code: 18-23224
- GNIS feature ID: 453295

Finley Township is one of five townships in Scott County, Indiana. As of the 2010 census, its population was 1,469 and it contained 630 housing units.

== Geography ==
According to the 2010 census, the township has a total area of 39.62 square miles (102.6 km^{2}), of which 39.35 square miles (101.9 km^{2}) (or 99.32%) is land and 0.27 square miles (0.70 km^{2}) (or 0.68%) is water.

=== Unincorporated towns ===
- Leota
