= Hardy Lake =

Reservoir in Indiana, United States

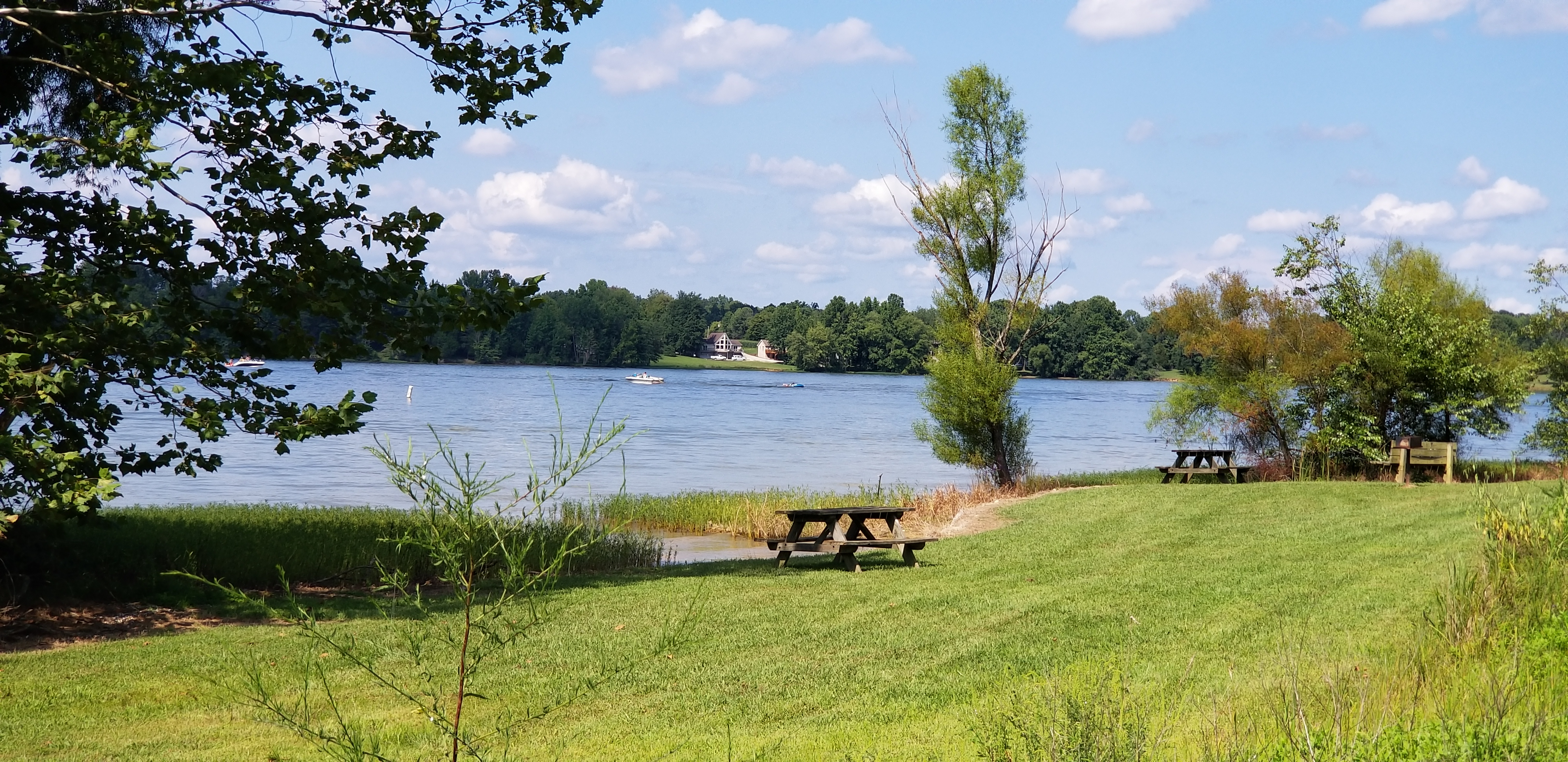
- Hardy Lake picnic area with boats visible on the lake

- Location within Indiana Location within the United States
- Location: Scott / Jefferson counties, Indiana, United States
- Coordinates: 38°47′28″N 085°42′57″W
- Type: reservoir
- Primary inflows: Quick's Creek
- Primary outflows: Quick's Creek
- Basin countries: United States
- Surface area: 741 acres (3.0 km^{2})

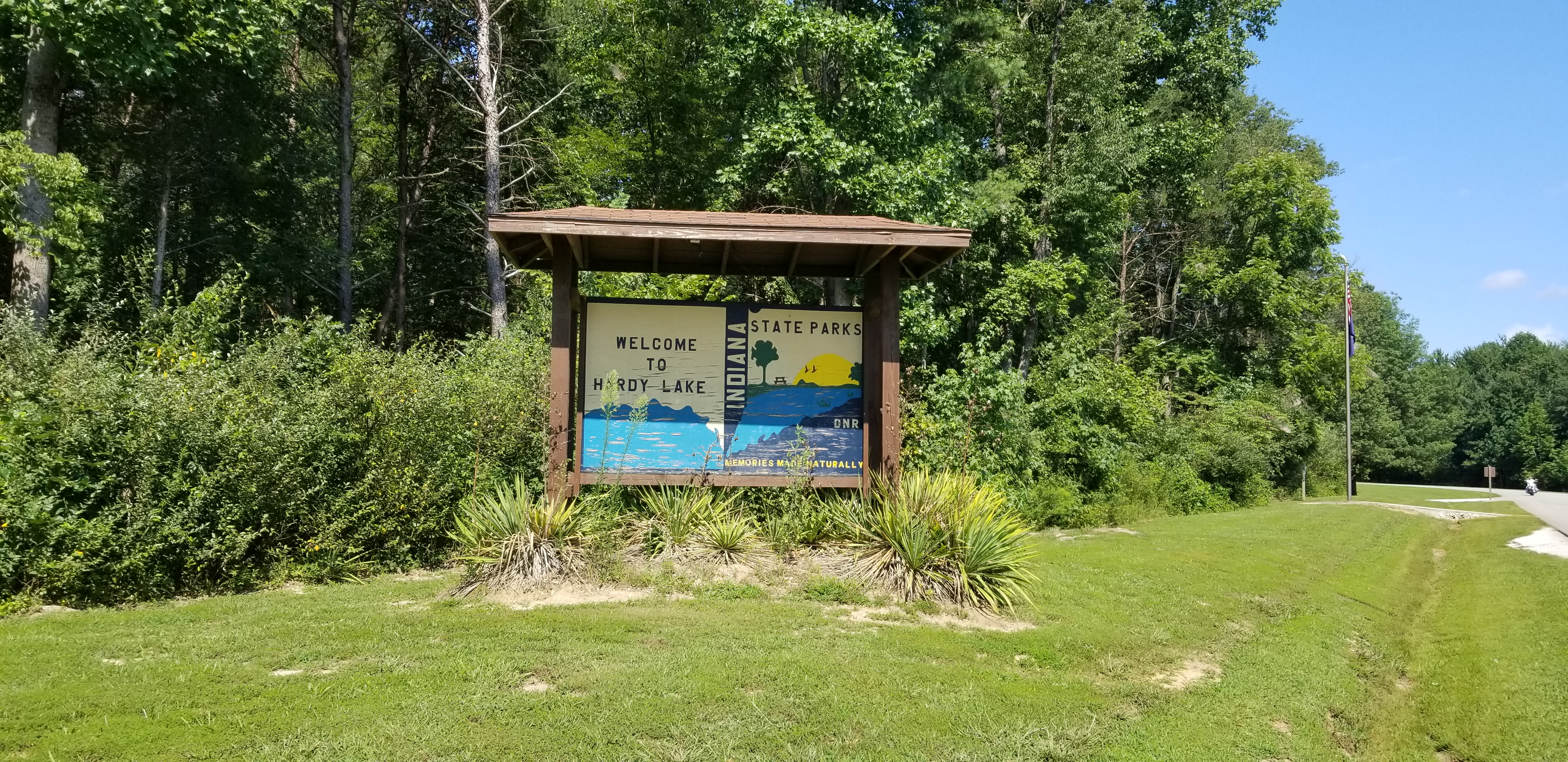
Sign welcoming visitors to Hardy Lake

Hardy Lake, originally named Quick Creek Reservoir, is an Indiana state reservoir in Scott and Jefferson counties, Indiana. It is located four miles (6 km) east of Austin, Indiana and 35 miles (56 km) north of Louisville, Kentucky. It is the smallest reservoir maintained by the state of Indiana, measuring 2,448 acres (9.9 km^{2}) of total property, and 741 acres (3.0 km^{2}) of surface area for the lake. The lake is approximately 38 feet (12 m) deep.

Hardy Lake is surrounded by other state and federal properties. Fifteen miles to the north is the Muscatatuck National Wildlife Refuge, 12 miles to the northeast is Crosley Fish and Wildlife Area; 15 miles to the east is Clifty Falls State Park; 20 miles to the south is Clark State Forest; and 20 miles to the west is Starve Hollow S.R.A.

== Creation ==
The reservoir was constructed in 1970 by damming Quick's Creek. The state hoped the reservoir would provide a stable source of water for nearby communities in Scott County. The lake's water elevation does remain at a stable level, unlike the water elevations of most reservoirs. The dam that creates the reservoir is an earth filled dam, 52 feet (16 m) high and 376 feet (115 m) wide, downstream of 12 square miles (31 km^{2}) of drainage area. The reservoir is now used as a back-up source of water for the Stucker Fork Conservancy District, whose primary source of water is the East Fork of the Muscatatuck River.

When Hardy Lake was completed, Indiana governor Otis R. Bowen hailed it as part of his goal of having a park controlled by the state of Indiana within driving distance of every Hoosier. Hardy Lake is part of a statewide system of reservoirs created during the 1960s and 1970s by the state of Indiana and the United States Army Corps of Engineers.

== Other uses ==
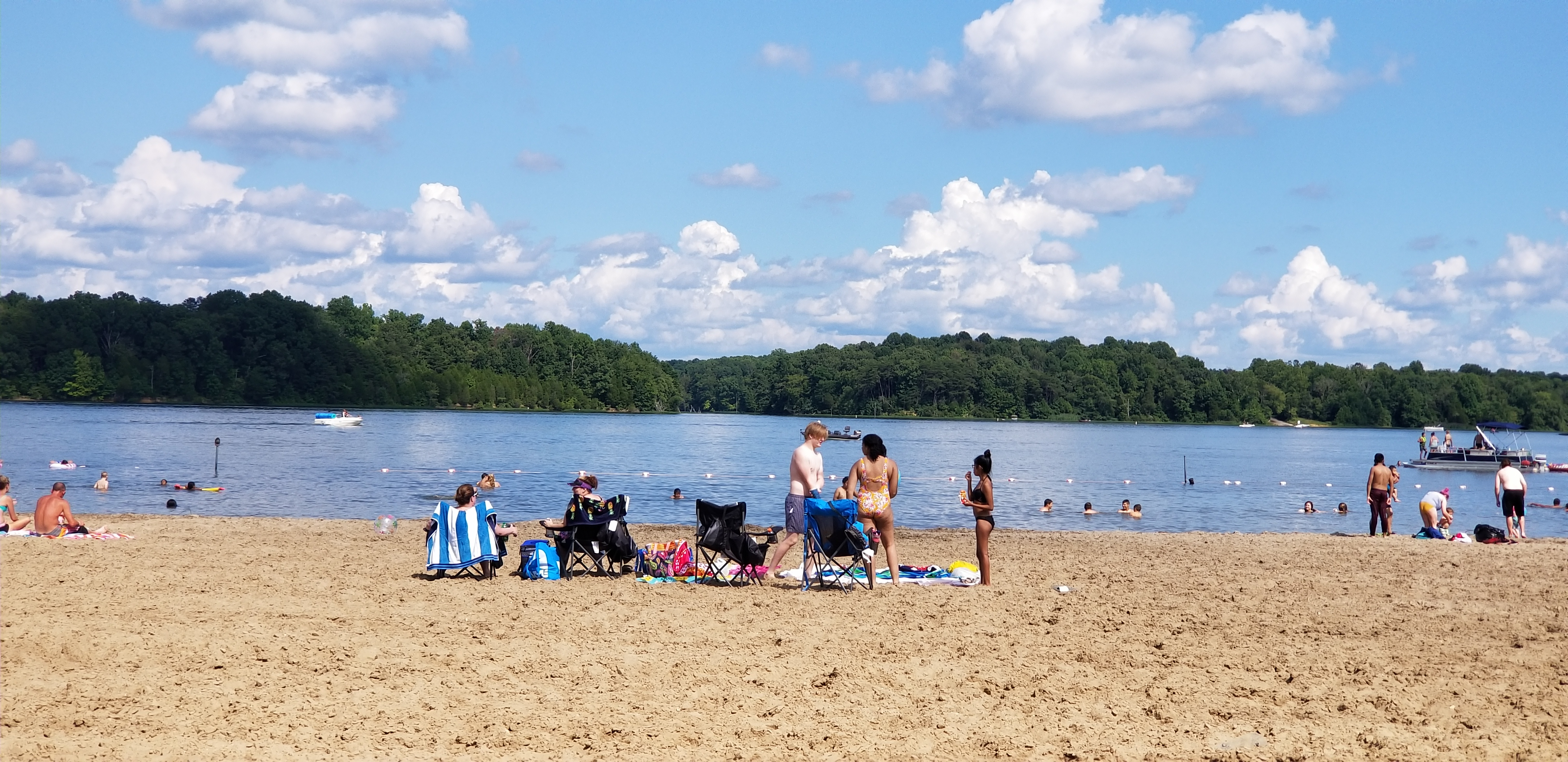
The beach at Hardy Lake with beach goers and boats visible.

Other features of the park include the McClain Cemetery, which dates back to the 18th century, a mound of Allegheny mound ants, foxfire, and a trail exclusively designed to test one's archery skills. Seasonal fishing and hunting are permitted within the park. The park contains a large population of fish including bluegill, catfish, black crappie, largemouth bass, redear sunfish, and tiger muskie. Animals available to hunt not only include the typical deer and turkey, but also quail, snipe, and woodchuck. The lake is open to boating and fishing and has four public access ramps. The park is also home several species of birds including the red-necked grebe, mute swan, snow goose, and black vulture. Red-shouldered hawks are particularly noteworthy and nest around the lake in early spring through mid-summer.

The state's Division of Parks and Reservoirs maintains both primitive and modern camping sites in the park surrounding the lake. The park also includes a public swimming beach, bathhouses, and hiking trails making it a popular camping location. The Hardy Lake Sweep occurs annually at the lake when members of 4-H, the Boy Scouts of America and the Girl Scouts of the USA camp in the park for a weekend of work to clear the park's roads and shoreline of any litter.
