= Hibernia, Clark County, Indiana =

Unincorporated community in Indiana, United States

Hibernia
- Unincorporated community
- Clark County's location in Indiana

- Location in Clark County
- Coordinates: 38°30′07″N 85°31′32″W
- Country: United States
- State: Indiana
- County: Clark
- Township: Owen
- Elevation: 722 ft (220 m)
- ZIP code: 47111
- FIPS code: 18-33322
- GNIS feature ID: 436086

Hibernia is an unincorporated community in Owen Township, Clark County, Indiana.

== History ==
A post office was established at Hibernia in 1835, and remained in operation until it was discontinued in 1868. The community takes its name from Hibernia, a classical name for Ireland.

The community also has a (former) variant name, Solon.
