= Leota, Indiana =

- Unincorporated community
- Location within Indiana Location within the United States
- Coordinates: 38°38′54″N 85°51′01″W
- Country: United States
- State: Indiana
- County: Scott
- Township: Finley
- Elevation: 610 ft (190 m)
- Time zone: UTC-5 (Eastern (EST))
  - Summer (DST): UTC-4 (EDT)
- ZIP code: 47170
- Area codes: 812, 930
- GNIS feature ID: 437786

Leota is an unincorporated community in Finley Township, Scott County, in the U.S. state of Indiana.

== History and culture ==
Originally called Finley Crossroads after John Finley, an early settler, Leota, Indiana is described as being rich in agrarian culture. Two of Scott County's oldest roads, Cincinnati Trace (now Leota Road) and Brownstown-Charlestown Rd (Bloomington Trail Rd) intersect where there is now a covered bridge. The community was named for the first postmaster's (Mathias Mount) daughter who died when she was only two years old. At one time there was a general store, a canning factory, a post office in Leota and eleven one room schools in the township. The post office ran from 1884 to 1901.

The first doctor in the area was Dr. John Richey who married Sichy Collings, both survivors of the Pigeon Roost Massacre.

Morgan's Raid went through the township in the summer of 1863 taking horses, food, money, etc. while requiring ladies of the area to cook meals for them.

Over the years, Leota has remained deeply connected to agricultural roots. Much of the surrounding township remains active in agriculture through large farms, subsistence farms, household gardens and local husbandry.

Bethel Baptist Church is the primary church in the village with 100 or so active members. Her location on the hill overlooks the valley just below and carries one's eyes to the hills of the Knobstone Escarpment to the west.

Helen Trueblood has hosted a nationally recognized Daffodil Show here in April for many years. The Leota Frolic is held here each August as a way to celebrate the cultural history and spirit of Leota.

== Geography ==
Leota is located about 30 miles (47 km) north of Louisville, Kentucky.
