= Vienna Township, Scott County, Indiana =

Vienna Township
- Township
- Coordinates: 38°39′23″N 85°46′29″W
- Country: United States
- State: Indiana
- County: Scott

Government
  - Type: Indiana township

Area
  - Total: 40.46 sq mi (104.8 km^{2})
  - Land: 40.09 sq mi (103.8 km^{2})
  - Water: 0.37 sq mi (0.96 km^{2})
- Elevation: 561 ft (171 m)

Population (2020)
  - Total: 10,651
- FIPS code: 18-79100
- GNIS feature ID: 453959

Vienna Township is one of five townships in Scott County, Indiana. As of the 2010 census, its population was 10,008 and it contained 4,467 housing units.

== Geography ==
According to the 2010 census, the township has a total area of 40.46 square miles (104.8 km^{2}), of which 40.09 square miles (103.8 km^{2}) (or 99.09%) is land and 0.37 square miles (0.96 km^{2}) (or 0.91%) is water.

== Demography ==
Historical population
Census	Pop.	Note	%±
2000	9,160		—
2010	10,008		9.3%
2020	10,651		6.4%

Per 2020 data, 8.3% of the population is aged 18–24; 29.1% aged 25–44; 21.4% aged 45–64 and 20.5% aged 65+. Of this, 38.0% of the population is Protestant, 1.7% Catholic, 1.0% Mormon, and 59.3% unaffiliated.

Race	Percent
White	96.5%
Hispanic	3.7%
Black	0.3%
Asian	0.0%
American Indian & Alaska Natives	1.0%
Native Hawaiians & Other Pacific Islanders 0.0%	0.0%
Multi	1.0%
Other	1.2%

Education

39.7% of residents in Vienna township, Indiana have earned a bachelor's degree or higher, with 33.0% of the residents holding a STEM (Science, Technology, Engineering, Mathematics) degrees. 41.2% of residents hold some high school graduate degree (including equivalency).

=== Cities and towns ===
- Scottsburg

=== Unincorporated towns ===
- Marshfield
- Vienna
