= Johnson Township, Scott County, Indiana =

Johnson Township
- Township
- Coordinates: 38°44′55″N 85°42′24″W
- Country: United States
- State: Indiana
- County: Scott

Government
  - Type: Indiana township

Area
  - Total: 31.38 sq mi (81.3 km^{2})
  - Land: 30.2 sq mi (78 km^{2})
  - Water: 1.18 sq mi (3.1 km^{2})
- Elevation: 666 ft (203 m)

Population (2020)
  - Total: 2,427
  - Density: 83.4/sq mi (32.2/km^{2})
- FIPS code: 18-38772
- GNIS feature ID: 453517

Johnson Township is one of five townships in Scott County, Indiana. As of the 2010 census, its population was 2,520 and it contained 1,037 housing units.

== Geography ==
According to the 2010 census, the township has a total area of 31.38 square miles (81.3 km^{2}), of which 30.2 square miles (78 km^{2}) (or 96.24%) is land and 1.18 square miles (3.1 km^{2}) (or 3.76%) is water.

=== Unincorporated towns ===
- Albion
- Blocher
- New Frankfort
- Wooster
