= Vienna, Indiana =

- Unincorporated town
- Location within Indiana Location within the United States
- Coordinates: 38°38′56″N 85°46′08″W
- Country: United States
- State: Indiana
- County: Scott
- Township: Vienna
- Elevation: 571 ft (174 m)
- Time zone: UTC-5 (Eastern (EST))
  - Summer (DST): UTC-4 (EDT)
- ZIP code: 47170
- Area codes: 812, 930
- FIPS code: 18-79082
- GNIS feature ID: 445284

Vienna is an unincorporated town in Vienna Township, Scott County, in the U.S. state of Indiana.

== History ==
A post office was established at Vienna in 1832, and remained in operation until it was discontinued in 1942. The community was named after Vienna, in Austria.
