= Nabb, Indiana =

Unincorporated community in Indiana, United States

- Unincorporated community
- Clark County's location in Indiana

- Location in Clark County
- Coordinates: 38°36′20″N 85°37′58″W
- Country: United States
- State: Indiana
- County: Clark, Scott
- Township: Washington, Lexington
- Elevation: 699 ft (213 m)

Population
  - Total: 945
  - Density: 36/sq mi (14/km^{2})
- Time zone: UTC-5 (Eastern (EST))
  - Summer (DST): UTC-4 (EDT)
- ZIP code: 47147
- Area code: 812
- FIPS code: 18-51984
- GNIS feature ID: 439925

Nabb is an unincorporated community in Clark and Scott counties, in the U.S. state of Indiana.

== History ==
Nabb was named for General Nabb, a railroad official.

The community has had two post offices. The first one ran from 1878 to 1881, and the second one ran from 1914 to 1970.

Nabb was hit by an EF4 tornado on March 2, 2012. The tornado came from Marysville, five miles to the east, and proceeded toward Chelsea.

== Demographics ==
Nabb has a population of around 945 people.

99.6% of the population is white and less than 1% is Hispanic.

Since 2000 the population has grown by 10%

== See also ==
- Tornado outbreak of March 2–3, 2012
