= Indiana State Road 62 =

Highway in Indiana

State Road 62
- SR 62 highlighted in red

Route information
- Maintained by INDOT
- Length: 203.823 mi (328.021 km)
- Existed: October 1, 1926–present

Major junctions
- West end: IL 141 on the Wabash Memorial Bridge at the Illinois state line near New Haven, IL
- SR 69 in Mount Vernon; US 41 in Evansville; I-69 in Evansville; SR 61 in Boonville; US 231 in Dale; I-64 in New Albany; I-65 in Jeffersonville; I-265 in Jeffersonville; US 421 in Madison
- East end: SR 262 at Dillsboro

Location
- Country: United States
- State: Indiana
- Counties: Posey, Vanderburgh, Warrick, Spencer, Perry, Crawford, Harrison, Floyd, Clark, Jefferson, Ripley, Dearborn

Highway system
- Indiana State Highway System; Interstate; US; State; Scenic
← SR 61	→ SR 63

State Road 62 (SR 62) in the U.S. state of Indiana is an east–west route that travels 204 miles (328 km) from the Illinois state line in the southwest corner of Indiana to the Louisville, Kentucky, area, then northeast toward the Cincinnati, Ohio, area.

== Route description ==
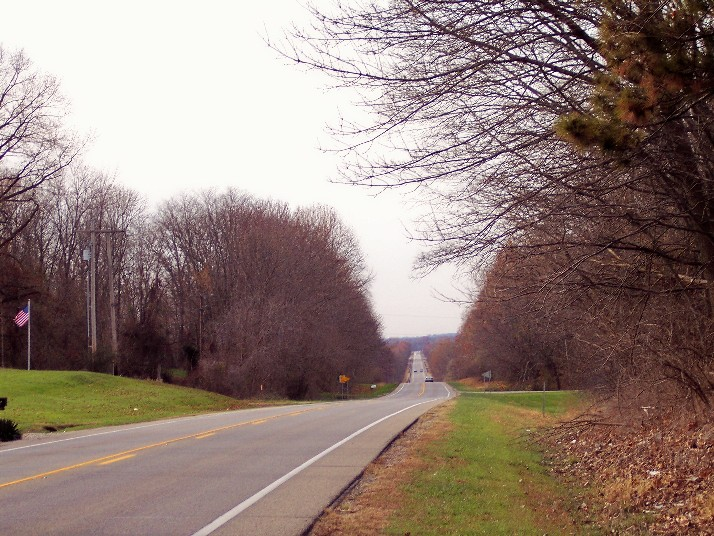
View along SR 62 facing west approaching the Wabash Memorial Bridge

SR 62 begins at the Wabash Memorial Bridge over the Wabash River between New Haven, Illinois and Posey County. It travels through Mount Vernon, Indiana and then becomes a divided highway as it approaches Evansville. Within Evansville, SR 62 forms part of the Lloyd Expressway, a divided expressway-grade highway that serves as a major east–west traffic artery through the city. The expressway contains a mix of intersections and interchanges. Nearly halfway through the city, the expressway meets US 41 and SR 62 leaves the expressway, running north concurrently with US 41 and SR 66. At Morgan Avenue, SR 62 turns east and leaves Evansville.

East of Evansville, the four lane divided road continues to Chandler and then on to Boonville. It then becomes a two-lane road. For much of its trip through Spencer, Perry, Crawford, Harrison, and western Floyd counties, it is narrow, winding, and hilly.

SR 62 travels concurrently with I-64 and I-265, bypassing the cities of New Albany, Clarksville, and Jeffersonville. The highway then turns to the northeast, serving the cities of Charlestown, Hanover, then having a junction at SR 56, and Madison before ending at SR 262 just south of US 50 at Dillsboro.

The highway forms part of the Lincoln Heritage Trail.

== History ==
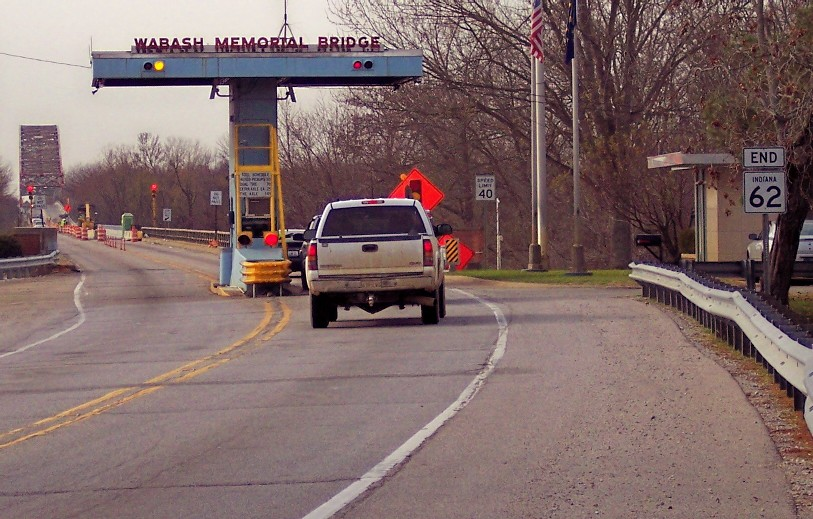
Western terminus of SR 62, at the Wabash Memorial Bridge on the Wabash River

In the pre-Interstate era, SR 62 between Evansville and New Albany was also part of US 460, a heavily traveled route between St. Louis, Missouri and Louisville, Kentucky before I-64 supplanted it as a through route.

Before the extension of I-265, SR 62 traveled directly through the cities of New Albany, Clarksville, and Jeffersonville.

=== Lloyd Expressway ===
West of US 41, SR 62 is known as the Lloyd Expressway within Vanderburgh County. It is named in honor of former Mayor Russell G. Lloyd, Sr. who was assassinated after leaving office in 1980. Evansville residents use the term "expressway" loosely due to the large number of stoplights along the Evansville stretch of the route. It is usually referred to simply as "the Lloyd".

The road was built in various stages and officially opened on July 19, 1988. The west section of the expressway was completed in the 1950s with plans to continue it east at a later date as funding became available. The $160 million expressway supplants the old Division Street/Pennsylvania Avenue corridor through the city, allowing drivers to travel from one end of the city to the other with much greater ease.

== Major intersections ==
County	Location	mi	km	Exit	Destinations	Notes
Posey	Black Township	0.00	0.00		IL 141 west – New Haven	Western terminus at Wabash Memorial Bridge
Posey	Mount Vernon	5.42	8.72		SR 69 south	Western end of SR 69 concurrency
Posey	Mount Vernon	10.71	17.24		SR 69 north – Griffin	Eastern terminus of SR 69 concurrency
Vanderburgh	Evansville	28.15	45.30		US 41 south / SR 66 east – Tell City, Henderson	Southern end of US 41 and SR 66 concurrences; known as the Lloyd Expressway from this interchange to the Posey County line
Vanderburgh	Evansville	29.78	47.93		US 41 north / SR 66 west – Vincennes, New Harmony	Northern end of US 41 and SR 66 concurrences; between I-69 and US 41, this stretch is known as Morgan Avenue.
Vanderburgh	Evansville	33.71	54.25		I-69 – Evansville, Indianapolis	
Warrick	Boonville	44.25	71.21		SR 261 south – Newburgh	Northern terminus of SR 261
Warrick	Boonville	44.66	71.87		SR 61 south	Western end of SR 61 concurrency
Warrick	Boonville	45.32	72.94		SR 61 north – Petersburg	Eastern end of SR 61 concurrency
Warrick	Skelton Township	50.38	81.08		SR 161 south – Richland City	Western end of SR 161 concurrency
Warrick	Skelton Township	55.57	89.43		SR 161 north – Tennyson	Eastern end of SR 161 concurrency
Spencer	Jackson Township	59.26	95.37		US 231 south – Chrisney	Southern end of US 213 concurrency
Spencer	Gentryville	63.06	101.49		SR 162 east – Santa Claus	Western terminus of SR 162
Spencer	Dale	67.68	108.92		US 231 north – Huntingburg	Northern end of US 231 concurrency
Spencer	Dale				SR 68 west – Lynnville	Eastern terminus of SR 68
Spencer	Carter Township	68.71	110.58		SR 245 south – Santa Claus	Northern terminus of SR 245 (spur to Holiday World & Splashin' Safari)
Spencer	Harrison Township	73.85	118.85		SR 162 – Santa Claus, Ferdinand	
Spencer	Harrison Township	78.05	125.61		SR 545 south – Troy	Northern terminus of the southern segment of SR 545
Perry	Clark Township	86.58	139.34		SR 145 – Birdseye	
Perry	St. Croix	92.77	149.30		SR 37 – Tell City	
Crawford	Sulphur	100.06	161.03		SR 66 west to SR 237 north – Derby, English	Western end of SR 66 concurrency
Crawford	Leavenworth	107.84	173.55		SR 66 east – Marengo	Eastern end of SR 66 concurrency
Harrison	White Cloud	116.01	186.70		SR 462 south	Northern terminus of SR 462 (spur to Harrison-Crawford State Forest)
Harrison	Corydon	122.99	197.93		SR 135 – Mauckport, Salem	
Harrison	Corydon	124.16	199.82		SR 337 north – Depauw	Northern end of SR 337 concurrency
Harrison	Corydon	124.27	199.99		SR 337 south	Southern end of SR 337 concurrency
Floyd	Georgetown Township	136.53	219.72		SR 11	Northern terminus of the southern segment of SR 11
Floyd	Georgetown Township	139.13	223.91	118	I-64 west / SR 64 west – Evansville, Georgetown	Western end of I-64 concurrency; eastern terminus of SR 64
Floyd	Floyds Knobs	140.97	226.87	119	US 150 west – Greenville	Western end of US 150 concurrency
Floyd	New Albany	144.69	232.86	121; 41	I-64 east / I-265 east / US 150 east – New Albany, Louisville	Eastern end of I-64 and US 150 concurrencies; western end of I-265 concurrency; western terminus of I-265; I-64 exit 121; I-265 exit 41
Clark	Jeffersonville	150.90	242.85	34	I-65 – Indianapolis, Louisville	
Clark	Jeffersonville	153.93	247.73	32	I-265 east	Eastern end of I-265 concurrency
Clark	Charlestown	161.11	259.28		SR 3 north – Charlestown	Southern terminus of SR 3
Clark–Jefferson county line	Washington–Saluda township line	176.30	283.73		SR 362 west	Eastern terminus of SR 362
Jefferson	Hanover	183.11	294.69		SR 356 west	Eastern terminus of SR 356
Jefferson	Hanover	183.40	295.15		SR 56 west – Scottsburg	Western end of SR 56 concurrency
Jefferson	Hanover	188.60	303.52		SR 256 – Austin, Madison	Eastern terminus of SR 256
Jefferson	Madison	192.57	309.91		SR 7 – Madison, North Vernon	
Jefferson	Madison	195.24	314.21		US 421 / SR 56 – Madison, Versailles	Roundabout; Eastern end of SR 56 concurrency
Jefferson	Jefferson Proving Ground	200.58	322.80		SR 250 west	Western end of SR 250 concurrency
Jefferson	Canaan	207.79	334.41		SR 250 east	Eastern end of SR 250 concurrency
Ripley	Cross Plains	212.23	341.55		SR 129 south	Southern end of SR 129 concurrency
Ripley	Cross Plains	214.70	345.53		SR 129 north	Northern end of SR 129 concurrency
Dearborn	Dillsboro	227.19	365.63		SR 262 to US 50	Eastern terminus
1.000 mi = 1.609 km; 1.000 km = 0.621 mi: Concurrency terminus
