= Dillsboro, Indiana =

- Town
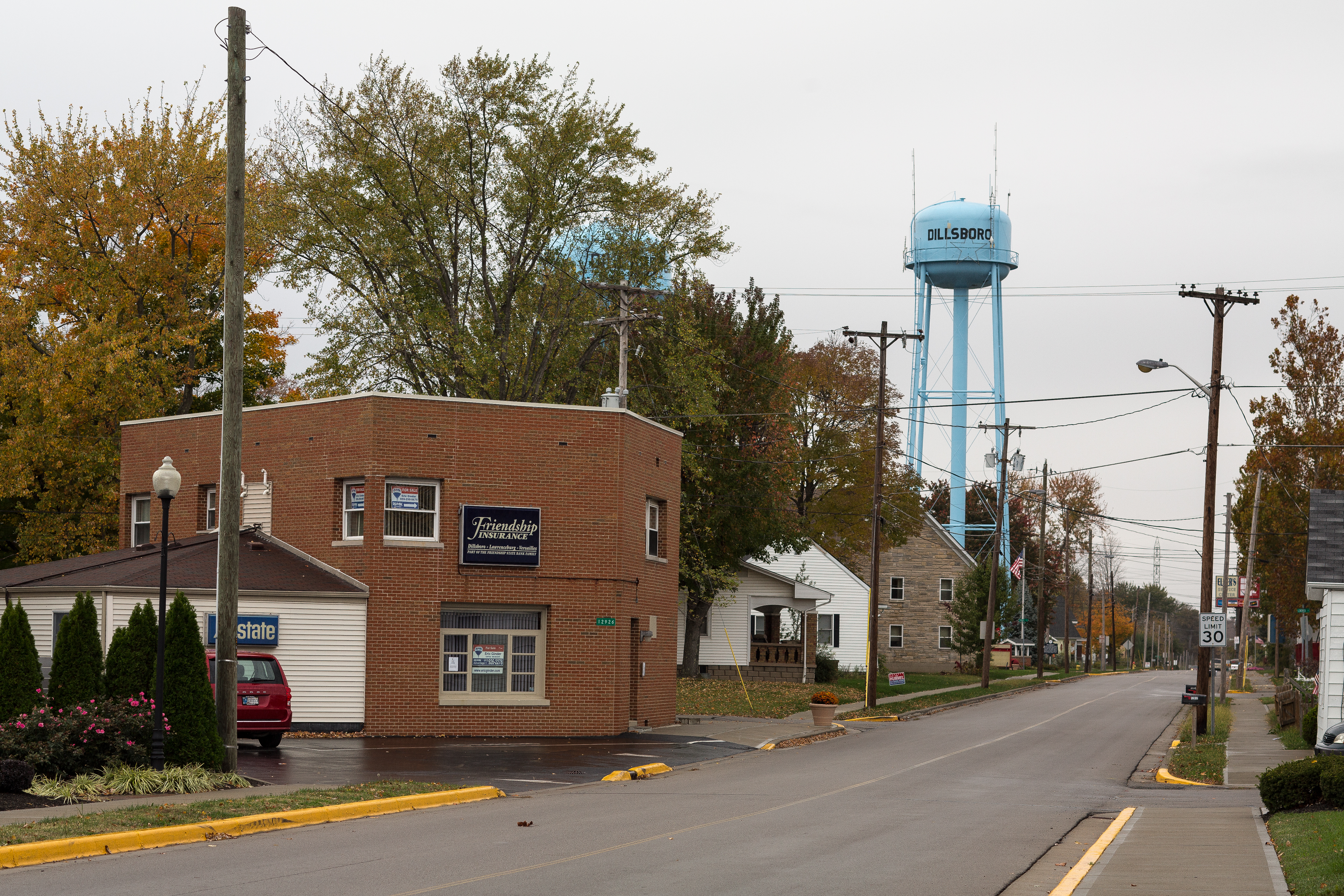

- Logo

- Location of Dillsboro in Dearborn County, Indiana.
- Coordinates: 39°01′06″N 85°03′10″W
- Country: United States
- State: Indiana
- County: Dearborn
- Township: Clay

Area
  - Total: 1.33 sq mi (3.45 km^{2})
  - Land: 1.33 sq mi (3.45 km^{2})
  - Water: 0 sq mi (0.00 km^{2})
- Elevation: 876 ft (267 m)

Population (2020)
  - Total: 1,360
  - Density: 1,020/sq mi (393.9/km^{2})
- Time zone: UTC-5 (EST)
  - Summer (DST): UTC-4 (EDT)
- ZIP code: 47018
- Area code: 812
- FIPS code: 18-18190
- GNIS feature ID: 2396687
- Website: dillsboro.in

Dillsboro is a town in Clay Township, Dearborn County, Indiana, United States. As of 2020, the population is 1,360.

== History ==
Dillsboro was laid out in 1830. It was named for James Dill, a general in the War of 1812 and local resident.

The Dillsboro post office, established in 1837, was spelled Dillsborough until 1893.

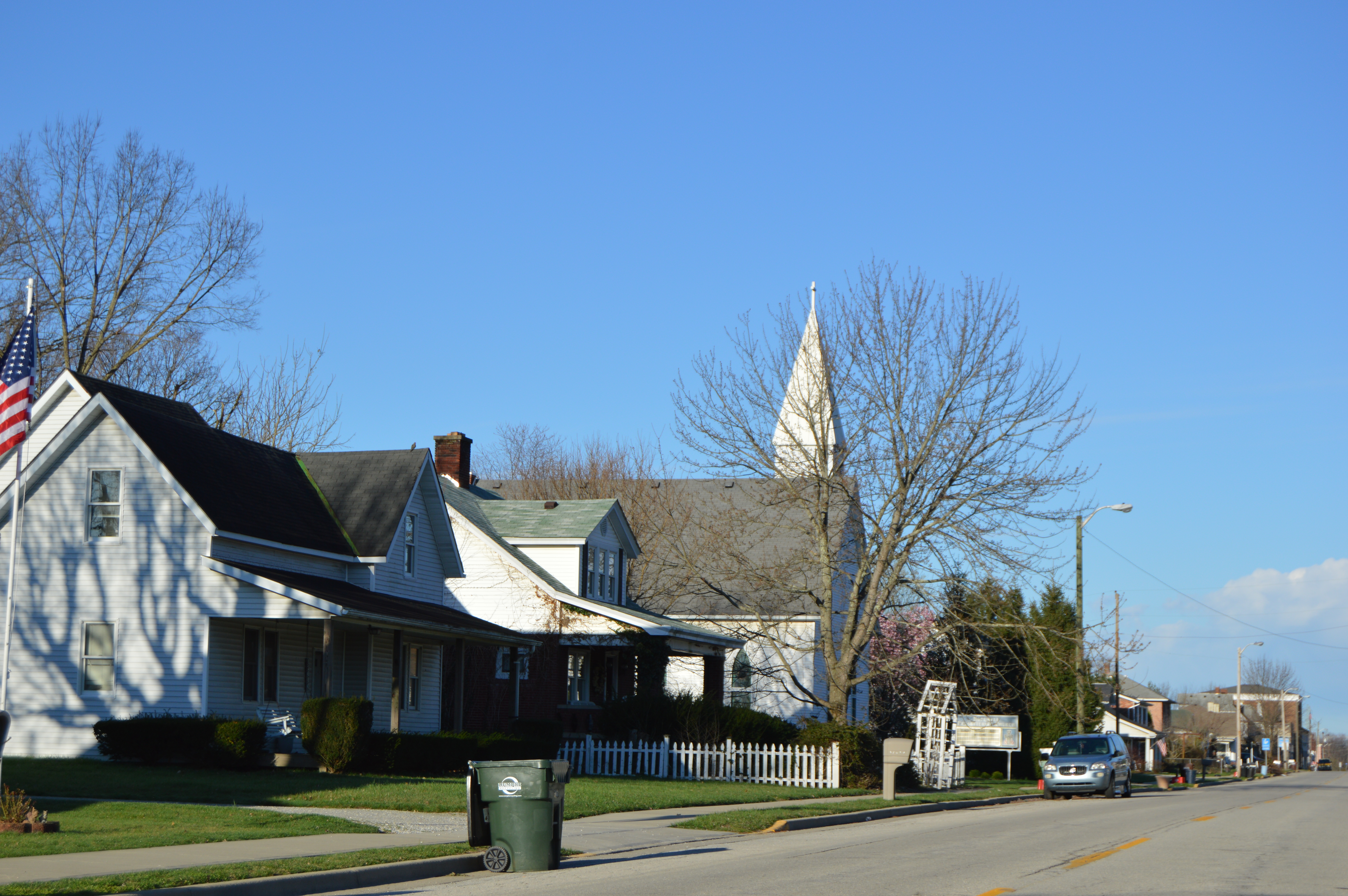
East North Street

== Geography ==
According to the 2010 census, Dillsboro has a total area of 1 square mile (2.59 km^{2}), all land.

=== Climate ===
The climate in this area is characterized by hot, humid summers and generally mild to cool winters. According to the Köppen Climate Classification system, Dillsboro has a humid subtropical climate, abbreviated "Cfa" on climate maps.

== Demographics ==
Historical population
Census	Pop.	Note	%±
1880	432		—
1890	439		1.6%
1900	465		5.9%
1910	425		−8.6%
1920	471		10.8%
1930	502		6.6%
1940	558		11.2%
1950	681		22.0%
1960	745		9.4%
1970	840		12.8%
1980	1,038		23.6%
1990	1,200		15.6%
2000	1,436		19.7%
2010	1,327		−7.6%
2020	1,360		2.5%
U.S. Decennial Census

=== 2020 census ===
As of the 2020 census, Dillsboro had a population of 1,360. The median age was 42.5 years. 22.4% of residents were under the age of 18 and 20.9% of residents were 65 years of age or older. For every 100 females there were 86.3 males, and for every 100 females age 18 and over there were 80.0 males age 18 and over.

0.0% of residents lived in urban areas, while 100.0% lived in rural areas.

There were 561 households in Dillsboro, of which 28.5% had children under the age of 18 living in them. Of all households, 34.9% were married-couple households, 17.1% were households with a male householder and no spouse or partner present, and 36.4% were households with a female householder and no spouse or partner present. About 35.6% of all households were made up of individuals and 17.0% had someone living alone who was 65 years of age or older.

There were 622 housing units, of which 9.8% were vacant. The homeowner vacancy rate was 1.7% and the rental vacancy rate was 5.9%.

Racial composition as of the 2020 census
Race	Number	Percent
White	1,301	95.7%
Black or African American	2	0.1%
American Indian and Alaska Native	3	0.2%
Asian	5	0.4%
Native Hawaiian and Other Pacific Islander	0	0.0%
Some other race	4	0.3%
Two or more races	45	3.3%
Hispanic or Latino (of any race)	17	1.2%

=== 2010 census ===
As of the census of 2010, there were 1,327 people, 520 households, and 320 families living in the town. The population density was 1,327.0 inhabitants per square mile (512.4/km^{2}). There were 580 housing units at an average density of 580.0 per square mile (223.9/km^{2}). The racial makeup of the town was 98.6% White, 0.2% African American, 0.2% Native American, 0.5% Pacific Islander, and 0.7% from two or more races. Hispanic or Latino of any race were 0.2% of the population.

There were 520 households, of which 31.5% had children under the age of 18 living with them, 40.8% were married couples living together, 14.8% had a female householder with no husband present, 6.0% had a male householder with no wife present, and 38.5% were non-families. 34.2% of all households were made up of individuals, and 18.6% had someone living alone who was 65 years of age or older. The average household size was 2.34 and the average family size was 2.95.

The median age in the town was 42.2 years. 23.1% of residents were under the age of 18; 6.9% were between the ages of 18 and 24; 24.6% were from 25 to 44; 21.2% were from 45 to 64; and 24.2% were 65 years of age or older. The gender makeup of the town was 44.6% male and 55.4% female.

=== 2000 census ===
As of the census of 2000, there were 1,436 people, 550 households, and 352 families living in the town. The population density was 1,421.6 inhabitants per square mile (548.9/km^{2}). There were 584 housing units at an average density of 578.1 per square mile (223.2/km^{2}). The racial makeup of the town was 98.19% White, 0.07% African American, 0.21% Native American, 0.14% Asian, 0.14% Pacific Islander, 0.42% from other races, and 0.84% from two or more races. Hispanic or Latino of any race were 1.11% of the population.

There were 550 households, out of which 32.9% had children under the age of 18 living with them, 46.5% were married couples living together, 12.7% had a female householder with no husband present, and 36.0% were non-families. 31.1% of all households were made up of individuals, and 17.6% had someone living alone who was 65 years of age or older. The average household size was 2.39 and the average family size was 2.99.

In the town, the population was spread out, with 23.7% under the age of 18, 8.8% from 18 to 24, 24.7% from 25 to 44, 18.5% from 45 to 64, and 24.3% who were 65 years of age or older. The median age was 39 years. For every 100 females there were 81.3 males. For every 100 females age 18 and over, there were 78.8 males.

The median income for a household in the town was $28,462, and the median income for a family was $38,750. Males had a median income of $31,196 versus $21,250 for females. The per capita income for the town was $14,984. About 8.9% of families and 10.5% of the population were below the poverty line, including 11.6% of those under age 18 and 7.6% of those age 65 or over.

== Buildings ==
The Hopewell Presbyterian Church building dates from 1888, although the congregation was formed in 1818 and formally organized in 1828. The building is a classic example of home-based architecture - complete with tiffany glass windows and hand-made pews.
