= Scott County, Indiana =

County in Indiana, United States

- County
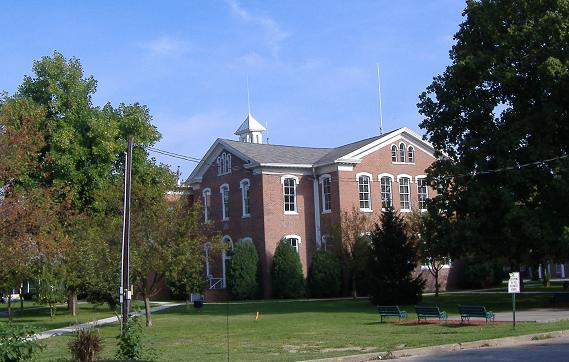
- Scott County Courthouse in Scottsburg, Indiana

- Location within the U.S. state of Indiana
- Coordinates: 38°41′N 85°44′W
- Country: United States
- State: Indiana
- Founded: 1820
- Named for: Charles Scott
- Seat: Scottsburg
- Largest city: Scottsburg

Area
  - Total: 192.75 sq mi (499.2 km^{2})
  - Land: 190.40 sq mi (493.1 km^{2})
  - Water: 2.35 sq mi (6.1 km^{2}) 1.22%

Population (2020)
  - Total: 24,384
  - Estimate (2025): 25,053 ▲
  - Density: 128.07/sq mi (49.447/km^{2})
- Time zone: UTC−5 (Eastern)
  - Summer (DST): UTC−4 (EDT)
- Congressional district: 9th
- Website: www.scottcounty.in.gov
- Indiana county number 72

Scott County is a county located in the U.S. state of Indiana. As of 2020, the population was 24,384. The county seat is Scottsburg.

== History ==
Scott County was formed in 1820 from portions of Clark, Jackson, Jefferson, Jennings, and Washington counties. It was named for Gen. Charles Scott, who was Governor of Kentucky from 1808 to 1812.

== Geography ==
According to the 2010 census, the county has a total area of 192.75 square miles (499.2 km^{2}), of which 190.40 square miles (493.1 km^{2}) (or 98.78%) is land and 2.35 square miles (6.1 km^{2}) (or 1.22%) is water.

=== Cities and towns ===
- Austin
- Scottsburg

=== Unincorporated towns ===
- Blocher
- Nabb
- Vienna
- Leota
- Lexington

=== Townships ===
- Finley
- Jennings
- Johnson
- Lexington
- Vienna

=== Adjacent counties ===
- Jennings County (northeast)
- Jefferson County (east)
- Clark County (south)
- Washington County (west)
- Jackson County (northwest)

=== Transit ===
- Southern Indiana Transit System

=== Major highways ===
- Interstate 65
- U.S. Route 31
- State Road 3
- State Road 56
- State Road 160
- State Road 203
- State Road 256
- State Road 356
- State Road 362

== Climate and weather ==
Scottsburg, Indiana

Climate chart (precipitation, max. and min. temperature)
J	F	M	A	M	J	J	A	S	O	N	D
3.1 38 20	2.8 44 23	4.1 55 32	4.4 66 42	4.8 75 52	4.2 84 61	4.4 87 65	4.4 86 63	3.1 80 55	2.9 68 42	3.7 55 34	3.4 43 25
- █ Average max. and min. temperatures in °F
- █ Precipitation totals in inches
- Source: The Weather Channel
Metric conversion
J	F	M	A	M	J	J	A	S	O	N	D
79 3 −7	72 7 −5	103 13 0	111 19 6	121 24 11	107 29 16	113 31 18	111 30 17	78 27 13	74 20 6	93 13 1	85 6 −4
- █ Average max. and min. temperatures in °C
- █ Precipitation totals in mm

In recent years, average temperatures in Scottsburg have ranged from a low of 20 °F (−7 °C) in January to a high of 87 °F (31 °C) in July, although a record low of −32 °F (−36 °C) was recorded in January 1977 and a record high of 109 °F (43 °C) was recorded in July 1930. Average monthly precipitation ranged from 2.84 inches (72 mm) in February to 4.75 inches (121 mm) in May.

== Government ==
The county government is a constitutional body, and is granted specific powers by the Constitution of Indiana, and by the Indiana Code.

County Council: The county council is the legislative branch of the county government and controls all the spending and revenue collection in the county. Representatives are elected from county districts. The council members serve four-year terms. They are responsible for setting salaries, the annual budget, and special spending. The council also has limited authority to impose local taxes, in the form of an income and property tax that is subject to state level approval, excise taxes, and service taxes.

Board of Commissioners: The executive body of the county is made of a board of commissioners. The commissioners are elected county-wide, in staggered terms, and each serves a four-year term. One of the commissioners, typically the most senior, serves as president. The commissioners are charged with executing the acts legislated by the council, collecting revenue, and managing the day-to-day functions of the county government.

Court: The county maintains a small claims court that can handle some civil cases. The judge on the court is elected to a term of four years and must be a member of the Indiana Bar Association. The judge is assisted by a constable who is also elected to a four-year term. In some cases, court decisions can be appealed to the state level circuit court.

County Officials: The county has several other elected offices, including sheriff, coroner, auditor, treasurer, recorder, surveyor, and circuit court clerk. Each of these elected officers serves a term of four years and oversees a different part of county government. Members elected to county government positions are required to declare party affiliations and to be residents of the county.

Scott County is part of Indiana's 9th congressional district and is represented in Congress by Republican Trey Hollingsworth.

United States presidential election results for Scott County, Indiana
Year	Republican		Democratic		Third party(ies)	
Year	No.	%	No.	%	No.	%
1888	743	41.28%	1,030	57.22%	27	1.50%
1892	727	39.32%	1,043	56.41%	79	4.27%
1896	837	40.07%	1,237	59.21%	15	0.72%
1900	874	41.15%	1,221	57.49%	29	1.37%
1904	953	44.85%	1,090	51.29%	82	3.86%
1908	979	42.96%	1,243	54.54%	57	2.50%
1912	327	16.83%	1,033	53.17%	583	30.01%
1916	802	41.99%	1,068	55.92%	40	2.09%
1920	1,709	47.51%	1,848	51.38%	40	1.11%
1924	1,532	44.59%	1,824	53.08%	80	2.33%
1928	1,719	52.68%	1,527	46.80%	17	0.52%
1932	1,722	42.96%	2,240	55.89%	46	1.15%
1936	2,034	42.86%	2,696	56.81%	16	0.34%
1940	2,285	45.96%	2,668	53.66%	19	0.38%
1944	2,379	47.07%	2,621	51.86%	54	1.07%
1948	2,429	43.11%	3,128	55.51%	78	1.38%
1952	2,984	50.08%	2,931	49.19%	44	0.74%
1956	3,117	50.63%	3,011	48.91%	28	0.45%
1960	3,213	50.99%	3,064	48.63%	24	0.38%
1964	1,992	32.11%	4,205	67.79%	6	0.10%
1968	2,671	42.62%	2,796	44.61%	800	12.77%
1972	3,564	55.77%	2,785	43.58%	42	0.66%
1976	2,657	38.14%	4,229	60.71%	80	1.15%
1980	3,432	46.83%	3,694	50.40%	203	2.77%
1984	4,110	54.16%	3,460	45.60%	18	0.24%
1988	3,455	50.41%	3,378	49.29%	21	0.31%
1992	2,649	33.71%	4,085	51.98%	1,125	14.31%
1996	2,620	36.35%	3,798	52.70%	789	10.95%
2000	3,761	47.94%	3,915	49.90%	170	2.17%
2004	4,793	55.24%	3,822	44.05%	62	0.71%
2008	4,445	49.75%	4,271	47.80%	219	2.45%
2012	4,539	52.05%	3,998	45.85%	183	2.10%
2016	6,074	66.40%	2,642	28.88%	431	4.71%
2020	7,331	72.00%	2,701	26.53%	150	1.47%
2024	7,633	74.93%	2,389	23.45%	165	1.62%

== Demographics ==
Historical population
Census	Pop.	Note	%±
1820	2,334		—
1830	3,092		32.5%
1840	4,242		37.2%
1850	5,885		38.7%
1860	7,303		24.1%
1870	7,873		7.8%
1880	8,343		6.0%
1890	7,833		−6.1%
1900	8,307		6.1%
1910	8,323		0.2%
1920	7,424		−10.8%
1930	6,664		−10.2%
1940	8,978		34.7%
1950	11,519		28.3%
1960	14,463		25.6%
1970	17,144		18.5%
1980	20,422		19.1%
1990	20,991		2.8%
2000	22,960		9.4%
2010	24,181		5.3%
2020	24,384		0.8%
2025 (est.)	25,053	▲	2.7%
U.S. Decennial Census; 1790-1960 1900-1990; 1990-2000 2010

=== Racial and ethnic composition ===
Scott County, Indiana – Racial and ethnic composition Note: the US Census treats Hispanic/Latino as an ethnic category. This table excludes Latinos from the racial categories and assigns them to a separate category. Hispanics/Latinos may be of any race.
Race / Ethnicity (NH = Non-Hispanic)	Pop 1980	Pop 1990	Pop 2000	Pop 2010	Pop 2020	% 1980	% 1990	% 2000	% 2010	% 2020
White alone (NH)	20,123	20,752	22,538	23,471	22,829	98.54%	98.86%	98.16%	97.06%	93.62%
Black or African American alone (NH)	2	16	10	52	92	0.01%	0.08%	0.04%	0.22%	0.38%
Native American or Alaska Native alone (NH)	17	24	35	43	27	0.08%	0.11%	0.15%	0.18%	0.11%
Asian alone (NH)	43	48	39	104	87	0.21%	0.23%	0.17%	0.43%	0.36%
Native Hawaiian or Pacific Islander alone (NH)	x	x	0	14	11	x	x	0.00%	0.06%	0.05%
Other race alone (NH)	6	3	5	8	44	0.03%	0.01%	0.02%	0.03%	0.18%
Mixed race or Multiracial (NH)	x	x	111	135	759	x	x	0.48%	0.56%	3.11%
Hispanic or Latino (any race)	231	148	222	354	535	1.13%	0.71%	0.97%	1.46%	2.19%
Total	20,422	20,991	22,960	24,181	24,384	100.00%	100.00%	100.00%	100.00%	100.00%

=== 2020 census ===
As of the 2020 census, the county had a population of 24,384. The median age was 41.1 years. 22.7% of residents were under the age of 18 and 17.7% of residents were 65 years of age or older. For every 100 females there were 96.3 males, and for every 100 females age 18 and over there were 95.2 males age 18 and over.

The racial makeup of the county was 94.5% White, 0.4% Black or African American, 0.1% American Indian and Alaska Native, 0.4% Asian, 0.1% Native Hawaiian and Pacific Islander, 0.8% from some other race, and 3.8% from two or more races. Hispanic or Latino residents of any race comprised 2.2% of the population.

31.1% of residents lived in urban areas, while 68.9% lived in rural areas.

There were 9,717 households in the county, of which 30.4% had children under the age of 18 living in them. Of all households, 46.6% were married-couple households, 18.7% were households with a male householder and no spouse or partner present, and 25.5% were households with a female householder and no spouse or partner present. About 27.2% of all households were made up of individuals and 11.6% had someone living alone who was 65 years of age or older.

There were 10,715 housing units, of which 9.3% were vacant. Among occupied housing units, 68.6% were owner-occupied and 31.4% were renter-occupied. The homeowner vacancy rate was 2.3% and the rental vacancy rate was 8.4%.

=== 2010 census ===
As of the 2010 United States census, there were 24,181 people, 9,397 households, and 6,648 families residing in the county. The population density was 127.0 inhabitants per square mile (49.0/km^{2}). There were 10,440 housing units at an average density of 54.8 per square mile (21.2/km^{2}). The racial makeup of the county was 97.9% white, 0.4% Asian, 0.2% American Indian, 0.2% black or African American, 0.1% Pacific islander, 0.5% from other races, and 0.7% from two or more races. Those of Hispanic or Latino origin made up 1.5% of the population. In terms of ancestry, 20.1% were American, 15.6% were German, 11.9% were Irish, and 10.0% were English.

Of the 9,397 households, 34.1% had children under the age of 18 living with them, 51.4% were married couples living together, 13.0% had a female householder with no husband present, 29.3% were non-families, and 24.0% of all households were made up of individuals. The average household size was 2.54 and the average family size was 2.97. The median age was 39.3 years.

The median income for a household in the county was $47,697 and the median income for a family was $46,775. Males had a median income of $37,505 versus $30,107 for females. The per capita income for the county was $19,414. About 12.2% of families and 15.9% of the population were below the poverty line, including 22.6% of those under age 18 and 14.4% of those age 65 or over.

== 2015 HIV Outbreak ==
In late 2014 and early 2015, 17 HIV infections arising from Scott County initiated an Indiana Department of Health investigation that would result in the state declaring a public health emergency. The outbreak was fueled in part to intravenous drug use resulting from the opioid epidemic compounded by poor access to HIV testing. The public health crisis led to Governor Mike Pence signing an executive order allowing a needle exchange site to open; before that time, needle exchanges were illegal in the state of Indiana. This was cited as the turning point in the outbreak, which allowed a county physician, Dr. William Cooke, to provide resources to those at risk or experiencing an HIV outbreak. This became the first needle exchange to exist in Indiana; a total of 9 would ultimately exist in the state. A total of 215 cases were eventually attributed to the outbreak. Despite the success of the program, county officials voted 2–1 to end the needle exchange program in June 2021.

== See also ==
- Scottsburg Senior High School
- Louisville/Jefferson County–Elizabethtown–Bardstown, KY-IN Combined Statistical Area
- National Register of Historic Places listings in Scott County, Indiana
