= Lexington Township, Scott County, Indiana =

Lexington Township
- Township
- Coordinates: 38°39′16″N 85°38′43″W
- Country: United States
- State: Indiana
- County: Scott

Government
  - Type: Indiana township

Area
  - Total: 50.06 sq mi (129.7 km^{2})
  - Land: 49.58 sq mi (128.4 km^{2})
  - Water: 0.48 sq mi (1.2 km^{2})
- Elevation: 682 ft (208 m)

Population (2020)
  - Total: 3,380
  - Density: 71.6/sq mi (27.6/km^{2})
- FIPS code: 18-43164
- GNIS feature ID: 453549

Lexington Township is one of five townships in Scott County, Indiana. As of the 2010 census, its population was 3,551 and it contained 1,446 housing units.

== Geography ==
According to the 2010 census, the township has a total area of 50.06 square miles (129.7 km^{2}), of which 49.58 square miles (128.4 km^{2}) (or 99.04%) is land and 0.48 square miles (1.2 km^{2}) (or 0.96%) is water.

=== Unincorporated towns ===
- Lexington
- Nabb
