= Lexington, Indiana =

- Unincorporated community
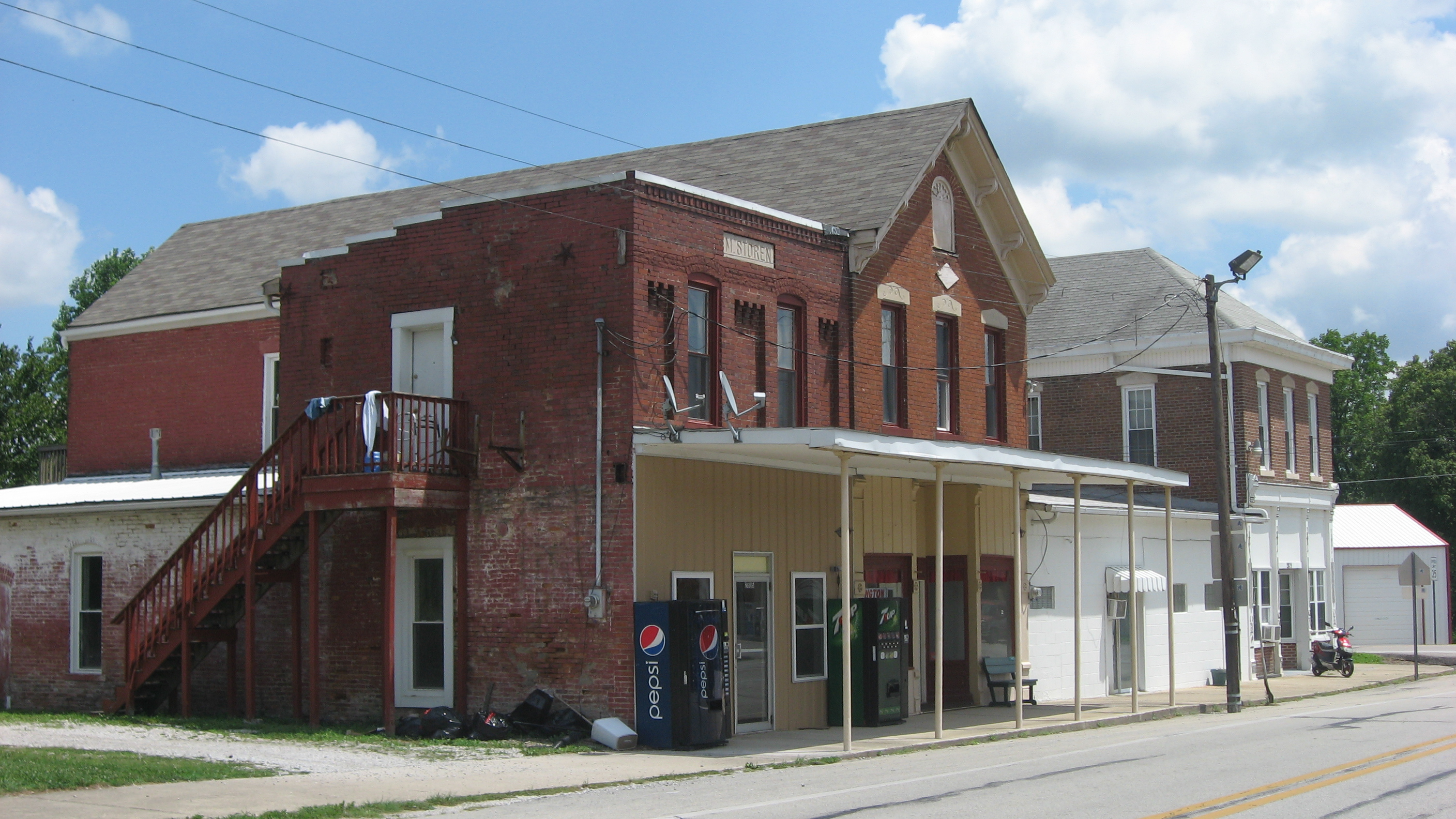
- Businesses in the center of the community

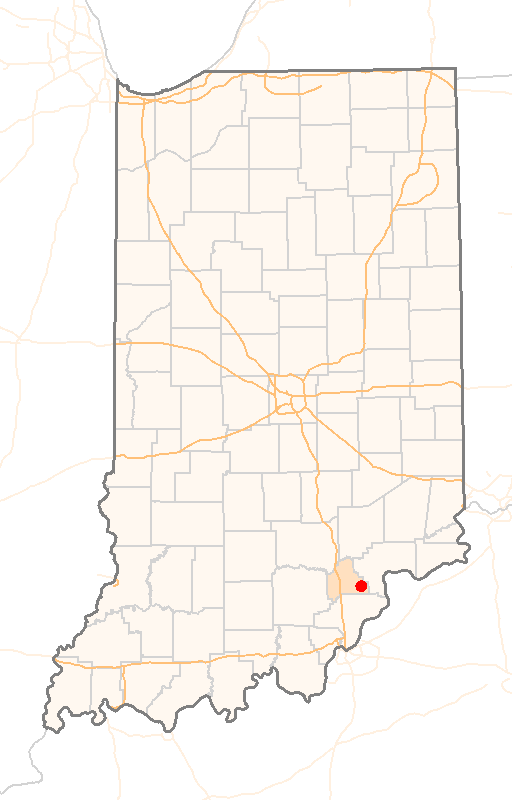
- Location of Lexington in the state of Indiana
- Coordinates: 38°39′08″N 85°37′28″W
- Country: United States
- State: Indiana
- County: Scott
- Township: Lexington
- Elevation: 630 ft (190 m)
- Time zone: UTC-5 (Eastern (EST))
  - Summer (DST): UTC-4 (EDT)
- ZIP code: 47138
- Area code: 812
- FIPS code: 18-43164
- GNIS feature ID: 437811

Lexington is an unincorporated community in Lexington Township, Scott County, in the U.S. state of Indiana, located about 10 miles west of the Ohio River and 28 miles north of Louisville, Kentucky. The town itself was founded before Indiana became the 19th state in 1816 and was located in Jefferson County at the time it was platted. It was the original county seat from 1820 to 1874, before local leaders decided on a more central location at nearby Scottsburg, which created animosity between the residents of the two towns for several decades afterwards.

== History ==
Lexington was originally settled in 1804 and platted in 1810. It was one of eight towns that were considered for the first state capital of Indiana, with Corydon gaining the honor. It was originally in Jefferson County until 1820, when Scott County was created from parts of Jennings, Jefferson, Clark, Washington and Jackson counties. This area of the state was largely settled by people from the Upper South, traveling by the Ohio River. Since there were no other towns in the county, Lexington was selected as the county seat. After later settlement in northern parts of the county, there were several unsuccessful attempts to relocate the county seat to a more central location. This did not take place until 1874 when residents voted to relocate the county seat to Scottsburg, then spelled "Scottsburgh". Records were removed from the courthouse and transferred at night to avoid a civil war between residents. The relocation of the county seat to Scottsburg created animosity between the two towns for several decades.

The Lexington post office has been in operation since 1820.

During the Civil War, Morgan's Raiders passed through Lexington on July 10–11, 1863, meeting little resistance upon entering the town.

The Reno Gang, who committed the first and second train robberies in the United States were held at the Scott County Jail in Lexington in 1868 for the robbery on May 22 at Marshfield, now a defunct community north of Scottsburg. After they were moved to the Floyd County Jail in New Albany, a mob broke into the jail and lynched them in the stairwell on December 11, 1868.

== Notable persons ==
- William Hayden English, Democratic vice-presidential candidate in 1880
- Samuel Y. Gordon, Lieutenant Governor of Minnesota
