= Lancaster Township, Jefferson County, Indiana =

Lancaster Township
- Township
- Location in Jefferson County
- Coordinates: 38°52′07″N 85°30′28″W
- Country: United States
- State: Indiana
- County: Jefferson

Government
  - Type: Indiana township

Area
  - Total: 32.23 sq mi (83.5 km^{2})
  - Land: 32.18 sq mi (83.3 km^{2})
  - Water: 0.05 sq mi (0.13 km^{2}) 0.16%
- Elevation: 794 ft (242 m)

Population (2020)
  - Total: 1,494
  - Density: 46.43/sq mi (17.93/km^{2})
- GNIS feature ID: 0453539

Lancaster Township is one of ten townships in Jefferson County, Indiana, United States. As of the 2020 census, its population was 1,494 (down from 1,511 at 2010) and it contained 610 housing units.

Historical population
Census	Pop.	Note	%±
1890	1,272		—
1900	1,279		0.6%
1910	1,229		−3.9%
1920	1,160		−5.6%
1930	953		−17.8%
1940	986		3.5%
1950	1,124		14.0%
1960	1,230		9.4%
1970	1,345		9.3%
1980	1,484		10.3%
1990	1,534		3.4%
2000	1,608		4.8%
2010	1,511		−6.0%
2020	1,494		−1.1%
Source: US Decennial Census

== History ==
Eleutherian College and the Lyman and Asenath Hoyt House are listed on the National Register of Historic Places.

== Geography ==
According to the 2010 census, the township has a total area of 32.23 square miles (83.5 km^{2}), of which 32.18 square miles (83.3 km^{2}) (or 99.84%) is land and 0.05 square miles (0.13 km^{2}) (or 0.16%) is water. The streams of Middle Fork Creek and Turkey Branch run through this township.

=== Cities and towns ===
- Dupont

=== Unincorporated towns ===
- Lancaster
- Middlefork

=== Extinct towns ===
- Five Points

=== Adjacent townships ===
- Bigger Township, Jennings County (north)
- Monroe Township (east)
- Madison Township (southeast)
- Smyrna Township (south)
- Graham Township (southwest)
- Lovett Township, Jennings County (west)
- Montgomery Township, Jennings County (west)

=== Cemeteries ===
The township contains five cemeteries: Bland, Clashman, College Hill, Nelson and Ogden.

=== Major highways ===
- Indiana State Road 7
- Indiana State Road 250

== Education ==
It is in the Madison Consolidated Schools school district.

The zoned MCS elementary school for part of the township is Anderson Elementary School, while another part is zoned to Deputy Elementary School. The zoned secondary schools of the Madison district are Madison Junior High School and Madison Consolidated High School.
