= Shelby Township, Jefferson County, Indiana =

Shelby Township
- Township
- Location in Jefferson County
- Coordinates: 38°52′43″N 85°16′34″W
- Country: United States
- State: Indiana
- County: Jefferson

Government
  - Type: Indiana township

Area
  - Total: 48.51 sq mi (125.6 km^{2})
  - Land: 48.33 sq mi (125.2 km^{2})
  - Water: 0.18 sq mi (0.47 km^{2}) 0.37%
- Elevation: 823 ft (251 m)

Population (2020)
  - Total: 1,151
  - Density: 23.82/sq mi (9.195/km^{2})
- GNIS feature ID: 0453844

Shelby Township is one of ten townships in Jefferson County, Indiana, United States. As of the 2020 census, its population was 1,151 and it contained 458 housing units.

Historical population
Census	Pop.	Note	%±
1890	1,583		—
1900	1,441		−9.0%
1910	1,330		−7.7%
1920	1,271		−4.4%
1930	1,091		−14.2%
1940	1,041		−4.6%
1950	978		−6.1%
1960	822		−16.0%
1970	705		−14.2%
1980	850		20.6%
1990	827		−2.7%
2000	1,052		27.2%
2010	1,133		7.7%
2020	1,151		1.6%
Source: US Decennial Census

== History ==
The first land acquired by settlers was in 1809 on the northern border with Ripley County. Many early settlers were Scotch-Irish and were prominent in forming the Jefferson Presbyterian Church in 1818. Another early group was what was known as "Low Dutch", families primarily of Dutch origin who had lived in the New Amsterdam settlements in New York and New Jersey and who moved to Kentucky in the early 1780s. They were also involved in the formation of Jefferson Presbyterian, but joined the former Pleasant Presbyterian church in neighboring Switzerland County when it formed in 1829.

About 1817, families of Lowland Scots began arriving, and more continued to arrive through the early 1830s. Many were from towns such as Glasgow, Paisley, Kilmarnock and the Edinburgh area. They founded a predecessor to Caledonia Church in 1818, which lasted until 1825, and formed the bulk of that church's membership when it was organized. The Scottish settlement stretched in Pleasant and Craig Townships in Switzerland County on the east and Milton Township in Jefferson County to the South.

Shelby Township was created from the northern part of Milton Township and the remnant of Pittsburgh Township on February 12, 1823 by the Jefferson County commissioners. The action wiped out Pittsburgh Township. Shelby was named after Isaac Shelby, who commanded troops at the battle of King's Mountain during the Revolutionary War.

In 1992, a 12 year old Shanda Sharer was murdered by a group of four teenage girls in Shelby Township.

== Geography ==
According to the 2010 census, the township has a total area of 48.51 square miles (125.6 km^{2}), of which 48.33 square miles (125.2 km^{2}) (or 99.63%) is land and 0.18 square miles (0.47 km^{2}) (or 0.37%) is water. The streams of Barbersville Creek, Black Branch, Bloody Run, Brushy Fork, Canaan Branch, Dry Fork, East Prong Indian-Kentuck, Hannibal Branch, Horton Branch, Little Brushy Fork, McCurry or McCrory's Branch, Miller Branch, Puncheon Camp Creek, Razor Fork, Salem Branch, Seals Fork, Shaw Branch, Spring Branch, Toddy's Branch, Vestal Branch, West Fork Indian-Kentuck, White Eye Branch, and Wilson's Fork, run through this township.

=== Unincorporated towns ===
- Barbersville
- Canaan
- China

=== Adjacent townships ===
- Brown Township, Ripley County (northeast)
- Pleasant Township, Switzerland County (east)
- Milton Township (south)
- Madison Township (southwest)
- Monroe Township (west)
- Shelby Township, Ripley County (northwest)

=== Cemeteries ===
The township contains these cemeteries: Canaan, Copeland, Etherton, Fry, Indian Kentuck, Jefferson Presbyterian, Lee, Lemen, Mathis, Means, Mermoud, Mount Pleasant Baptist, Pullum (or Pulliam), Riker, Risk, Rogers, Short (Blackhawk), Skeen, Spencer, Thornton, Vestal (Evans Farm) and Welch. Two cemeteries span the county line between Shelby Township and Pleasant Township, Switzerland county—Brushy Fork Baptist and Caledonia Presbyterian.

=== Major highways ===
- Indiana State Road 62
- Indiana State Road 250

== Education ==
It is in the Madison Consolidated Schools school district.

The zoned MCS elementary school is Rykers Ridge Elementary School. The zoned secondary schools of the Madison district are Madison Junior High School and Madison Consolidated High School.
