= Saluda =

Saluda may refer to any of the following in the United States:

- Saluda Township, Jefferson County, Indiana
  - Saluda, Indiana
- Saluda, North Carolina
  - Saluda Grade, once the steepest main-line railroad grade in the U.S.
- Saluda County, South Carolina
  - Saluda, South Carolina, county seat
- Saluda, Virginia
- Saluda River, in South Carolina
  - Saluda Lake, reservoir on the upper river
  - Little Saluda River
- Saluda (steamship), a riverboat which exploded on the Missouri River
- Saluda, a brand name of cymbals and drums; see cymbal manufacturers
