= Monroe Township, Jefferson County, Indiana =

Monroe Township
- Township
- Location in Jefferson County
- Coordinates: 38°52′16″N 85°24′58″W
- Country: United States
- State: Indiana
- County: Jefferson

Government
  - Type: Indiana township

Area
  - Total: 36.62 sq mi (94.8 km^{2})
  - Land: 36.6 sq mi (95 km^{2})
  - Water: 0.03 sq mi (0.078 km^{2}) 0.08%
- Elevation: 866 ft (264 m)

Population (2020)
  - Total: 374
  - Density: 10.2/sq mi (3.95/km^{2})
- GNIS feature ID: 0453640

Monroe Township is one of ten townships in Jefferson County, Indiana, United States. As of the 2020 census, its population was 374 (representing no change from 2010) and it contained 164 housing units.

Historical population
Census	Pop.	Note	%±
1890	1,267		—
1900	1,267		0.0%
1910	1,169		−7.7%
1920	1,091		−6.7%
1930	907		−16.9%
1940	881		−2.9%
1950	233		−73.6%
1960	263		12.9%
1970	398		51.3%
1980	357		−10.3%
1990	391		9.5%
2000	379		−3.1%
2010	374		−1.3%
2020	374		0.0%
Source: US Decennial Census

== History ==
Monroe was the next-to-last township created by the Jefferson County commissioners. It was carved from Lancaster Township on March 11, 1842. Much of township became part of the former Jefferson Proving Ground and a substantial part of the population relocated. As a result, there are few institutions or businesses remaining. The Hebron Baptist and Liberty Christian Churches are the only churches and there are no schools or post offices in Monroe Township.

Monroe Township had several post offices during its history:

- Alberta: May 4, 1893 – Jan. 31, 1899
- Belleview: March 15, 1890 – May 31, 1906 (originally named Mud Lick)
- Big Creek: Aug. 11, 1884 – Oct. 31, 1889; reestablished Feb. 10, 1891 – Apr. 30, 1903
- Bryantsburgh: June 10, 1834 – Dec. 12, 1856; recommissioned Jan. 18, 1858 – Dec. 10, 1872; reestablished Mar. 1, 1873 – July 29, 1907 (renamed Bryantsburg Jun. 10, 1893)
- Calloway: May 22, 1893 – Apr. 15, 1901
- Evans Rural Station: Oct. 1, 1902 – Sept. 30, 1934
- Faulkner: July 7, 1882 – Apr. 30, 1903
- How: Dec. 15, 1884 – Oct. 15, 1895
- Ridpath: Sept. 17, 1897 – Apr. 30, 1903.

=== Discontinued churches ===
Notable discontinued churches in Monroe Township include:

- An Adventist Church recorded in 1889 (dates unknown)
- Big Creek Methodist Church, founded Dec. 5, 1842; its cemetery was later moved to Madison in 1941
- Bryantsburg Presbyterian Church, formed Sept. 22, 1854; closed Apr. 30, 1867
- Mt. Zion Pilgrim Holiness Church, formed May 2, 1922
- Marble Methodist Church (also known as Marble Valley or Old Marble), opened May 28, 1859
- Union Methodist Church, first trustees elected Mar. 3, 1855; active at least until 1916.

The Hebron Church, which still meets in its building on Graham Road, was formed in March 1828. Its church cemetery was founded in 1815 as a community cemetery, but became associated with the church. The Liberty Christian Church in Belleview was founded in 1817 as a New Light Church, a dissident Presbyterian group. It soon became a Disciples of Christ congregation. Liberty Christian Church in Belleview became an un‑denominational congregation. Its original building, located on the west side of Michigan Road, was relocated after 1941 and later remodeled, incorporating parts of the original structure.

Oakdale School on the grounds of Jefferson Proving Ground was listed on the National Register of Historic Places in 1993.

=== The Monroe Presbyterian Church ===
Monroe Presbyterian Church, originally called Middlefork Presbyterian (founded Sept. 25, 1830), later underwent internal division and reorganization during the 19th century and united under the name Monroe Presbyterian Church by 1870 after the creation of the Jefferson Proving Ground.

== Geography ==
According to the 2010 census, the township has a total area of 36.62 square miles (94.8 km^{2}), of which 36.6 square miles (95 km^{2}) (or 99.95%) is land and 0.03 square miles (0.078 km^{2}) (or 0.08%) is water. The streams of Big Creek, Middle Fork; Toddys Branch and the West Fork Indian-Kentuck Creek run through this township.

=== Unincorporated towns ===
- Belleview
- Bryantsburg

=== Extinct towns ===
- Galloways Station. The U.S. board of geographic names is incorrect in labeling this Galloways Station, but has refused to acknowledge the mistake, which appears to be the result of typographical error. It was Calloway Station and the post office was Calloway. The map of Jefferson County in the 1876 Indian Historical Atlas Indiana Board of Tax Commissioners map of ca. 1896 and Galbraith's Railway Service Map of 1897/98 show the location as Calloway or Calloway's Station. In the 1988 edition of the Callaway Journal, a Callaway family publication, it was listed as Callaway's Station.

=== Adjacent townships ===
- Shelby Township, Ripley County (north)
- Shelby Township (east)
- Madison Township (south)
- Smyrna Township (southwest)
- Lancaster Township (west)
- Bigger Township, Jennings County (northwest)

=== Cemeteries ===
The township contains three cemeteries: Grandview Memorial Garden, Hebron Church Cemetery and Smith Cemetery. Grandview is a commercially operated facility that opened in the 1900s. Hebron was the only township cemetery not relocated after the founding of the former Jefferson Proving Ground in 1941. the Smith-Smart Cemetery, which was moved to Graham Rd, north of the Hebron Baptist Church, was originally located on the Michigan Road, near the Bayless Cemetery, which itself was in Madison Township and was also relocated.

Burials in the Baxter, Big Creek, Mt. Monroe, Marble Valley, and Monroe Cemeteries were removed to the east side of the Michigan Road (U.S. highway 421), south of Fairmount Cemetery in north Madison.

=== Major highways ===
- U.S. Route 421
- Indiana State Road 62
- Indiana State Road 250

== Education ==
It is in the Madison Consolidated Schools school district.

The zoned MCS elementary school for most of the township is Rykers Ridge Elementary School, while a small part is zoned to Anderson Elementary School. The zoned secondary schools of the Madison district are Madison Junior High School and Madison Consolidated High School.
