= Graham Township, Jefferson County, Indiana =

Graham Township
- Township
- Location in Jefferson County
- Coordinates: 38°46′54″N 85°37′52″W
- Country: United States
- State: Indiana
- County: Jefferson

Government
  - Type: Indiana township

Area
  - Total: 42.31 sq mi (109.6 km^{2})
  - Land: 42.09 sq mi (109.0 km^{2})
  - Water: 0.22 sq mi (0.57 km^{2}) 0.52%
- Elevation: 666 ft (203 m)

Population (2020)
  - Total: 1,618
  - Density: 38.44/sq mi (14.84/km^{2})
- GNIS feature ID: 0453333

Graham Township is one of ten townships in Jefferson County, Indiana, United States. As of the 2020 census, its population was 1,618 (slightly down from 1,668 at 2010) and it contained 705 housing units.

Historical population
Census	Pop.	Note	%±
1890	1,184		—
1900	1,186		0.2%
1910	1,213		2.3%
1920	1,228		1.2%
1930	903		−26.5%
1940	1,062		17.6%
1950	1,170		10.2%
1960	1,231		5.2%
1970	1,262		2.5%
1980	1,446		14.6%
1990	1,448		0.1%
2000	1,666		15.1%
2010	1,668		0.1%
2020	1,618		−3.0%
Source: US Decennial Census

== Geography ==
According to the 2010 census, the township has a total area of 42.31 square miles (109.6 km^{2}), of which 42.09 square miles (109.0 km^{2}) (or 99.48%) is land and 0.22 square miles (0.57 km^{2}) (or 0.52%) is water. The streams of Dry Branch, Lewis Creek, Little Creek, Neils Creek and Walton Creek run through this township.

=== Unincorporated towns ===
- Deputy

=== Extinct towns ===
- Parkers Station

=== Adjacent townships ===
- Montgomery Township, Jennings County (north)
- Lancaster Township (northeast)
- Smyrna Township (east)
- Republican Township (southeast)
- Lexington Township, Scott County (south)
- Johnson Township, Scott County (west)
- Marion Township, Jennings County (northwest)

=== Cemeteries ===
The township contains three cemeteries: Carmel, Robertson and Valley.

=== Major highways ===
- Indiana State Road 3
- Indiana State Road 56
- Indiana State Road 250
- Indiana State Road 256

== Education ==
It is in the Madison Consolidated Schools school district.

The zoned MCS elementary school is Deputy Elementary School. The zoned secondary schools of the Madison district are Madison Junior High School and Madison Consolidated High School.
