= Canaan, Indiana =

Canaan
- Census-designated place
- Location of Canaan in Jefferson County, Indiana

- Location within Indiana Location within the United States
- Coordinates: 38°51′57″N 85°17′59″W
- Country: United States
- State: Indiana
- County: Jefferson
- Township: Shelby

Area
  - Total: 0.28 sq mi (0.73 km^{2})
  - Land: 0.28 sq mi (0.73 km^{2})
  - Water: 0 sq mi (0.00 km^{2})
- Elevation: 951 ft (290 m)

Population (2020)
  - Total: 72
  - Density: 254.9/sq mi (98.42/km^{2})
- ZIP code: 47250
- FIPS code: 18-10036
- GNIS feature ID: 2587014

Canaan is an unincorporated community and census-designated place (CDP) in Shelby Township, Jefferson County, Indiana, United States. As of the 2020 census, Canaan had a population of 72.

== History ==
Canaan began growing slowly with the establishment of John Warfield's farm in 1812. The first known use of the name "Canaan" is dated November 15, 1832, when Edwards Ayres advertised that he had opened the Bee Hive, a public house, 14 miles from Canaan and 12 miles from Madison. On May 6, 1833, a road petition mentions Canaan in renaming a road to Versailles beginning at Canaan. It is generally recognized that Amos Simpers founded Canaan by virtue of the fact that he sold seven lots laid out along the road that is now State Road 62. On March 15, 1836, Canaan's original plat was filed in a Jefferson County deed book.

=== Indian-Kentuck Baptist Church ===
The Indian-Kentuck Baptist Church was established in 1814. In 1815, the church joined the Silver Creek Baptist Association, according to the earliest independent record. On November 27, 1819, the church purchased a lot on Toddy's Branch for relocation but instead chose a site at Flat Bottom Cemetery circa 1820. In either 1844 or 1865, dates being disputed, the church was moved to its present site on 4413 East 925 North just northwest of downtown Canaan. The pastor since 2019 is Rodney Asher. The church has seen a resurgence in the community of Canaan and in attendance in the congregation in recent years. The church has maintained a multi-county food pantry twice a month, and a presence at the Jefferson County fair, along with many other community outreach programs.

=== Canaan Methodist Church ===
Canaan Methodist Church was founded in 1830 by John Cain, William C. Sullivan, John Warfield, and Marscia Cook and their wives. The cemetery dates to 1829, with the first burial being that of a child named Susan Littlejohn. Katherine Cain is reported to be the next burial, which took place July 30, 1833. The land on which these burials occurred was deeded to church trustees by Amos Simpers on April 22, 1834. Three buildings were reported as church buildings. One made of logs was located about one-quarter mile north?est of the final church site. The other two were located next to the graveyard building, with the second in the 1840s and the last in 1868. On July 10, 1866, Joseph Lochard opened a store after operating a similar establishment in Manville for some time. This store was run by Joseph and later by his son Solomon Lochard, followed by Don Carlo Lochard.

=== Early business ===
During the 1840s and 1850s, a number of people operated businesses in Canaan. In 1829, a tavern was established by E.B. Bishop and a man named Etherton. In 1837, Ephraim and Coy Kennedy opened a store, and by 1840 they were operating Kennedy & Bros., a tobacco factory employing seven people. By 1850, 8,000 pounds of tobacco was used in the production of cigars, from which 780,000 were produced in 1850 and 750,000 were produced in 1870. By 1878, Canaan also had a drug store.

=== Social centers ===
On February 1, 1872, the Canaan Lodge of the Independent Order of Odd Fellows was incorporated. On August 17, 1868, Canaan Lodge 393 of Free & Accepted Masons was organized, only to be annulled. It was reestablished as Canaan Lodge 583 on February 28, 1890.

=== Canaan Fall Festival ===
The Canaan Fall Festival in Canaan is the site of the longest-running annual Pony Express ride. It is held annually on the third weekend in September with a wide variety of Music, Parade, antiques and collectibles, crafts, jewelry, fresh produce and furniture for sale. The Festival has seen an uplift in attendance and standing from 2021 to present

== Geography ==
Canaan is located in northeastern Jefferson County in the center of Shelby Township. State Roads 62 and 250 pass through the community together, along the eastern and southern sides. State Road 62 leads northeast 21 miles (34 km) to Dillsboro and southwest 11 miles (18 km) to the northern outskirts of Madison, the Jefferson county seat. State Road 250 leads east 7 miles (11 km) to Pleasant and southwest 6 miles (10 km) to U.S. Route 421, which leads south 7 miles (11 km) to the center of Madison.

According to the U.S. Census Bureau, the Canaan CDP has a total area of 0.31 square miles (0.80 km^{2}), of which 0.5 acres (2,074 m^{2}), or 0.26%, are water. The center of the community drains north via Canaan Branch into the valley of Indian Kentuck Creek, which flows south to the Ohio River at Brooksburg. The western edge of the Canaan CDP drains west to Toddys Branch, which flows to the West Fork of Indian Kentuck Creek.

== Demographics ==
Historical population
Census	Pop.	Note	%±
2020	72		—
U.S. Decennial Census

== Public services ==
Mail delivery was through the Barbersville post office until November 29, 1938, when William C. Sullivan became the first postmaster, located at Section 2N Twp. 5N Range 11E.

== Education ==
It is in the Madison Consolidated Schools school district.

There is a charter school called Canaan Community Academy. It is a K-8 school which opened in 2012 in the former Canaan Elementary School campus.

The zoned MCS elementary school for Canaan is Rykers Ridge Elementary School. The zoned secondary schools of the Madison district are Madison Junior High School and Madison Consolidated High School.

The first school of Canaan opened in 1872. It included a high school. Previously the school district operated Canaan Elementary School. The final building of that school opened in 1954. In 2010 the district board of trustees closed the elementary school. Tom Patterson, the superintendent, stated that the district wanted to save some money. A group of parents wanted to sue the district if it closed the school. The students were rezoned to an elementary school in Madison.
