= Milton Township, Jefferson County, Indiana =

Milton Township
- Township
- Location in Jefferson County
- Coordinates: 38°46′00″N 85°14′15″W
- Country: United States
- State: Indiana
- County: Jefferson

Government
  - Type: Indiana township

Area
  - Total: 35.07 sq mi (90.8 km^{2})
  - Land: 34.58 sq mi (89.6 km^{2})
  - Water: 0.5 sq mi (1.3 km^{2}) 1.43%
- Elevation: 453 ft (138 m)

Population (2020)
  - Total: 862
  - Density: 24.9/sq mi (9.62/km^{2})
- GNIS feature ID: 0453631

Milton Township is one of ten townships in Jefferson County, Indiana, United States. As of the 2020 census, its population was 862 (down from 896 at 2010) and it contained 450 housing units.

Historical population
| Census | Pop. | Note | %± |
|---|---|---|---|
| 1890 | 1,871 | | — |
| 1900 | 1,785 | | −4.6% |
| 1910 | 1,394 | | −21.9% |
| 1920 | 1,270 | | −8.9% |
| 1930 | 1,129 | | −11.1% |
| 1940 | 1,089 | | −3.5% |
| 1950 | 1,068 | | −1.9% |
| 1960 | 896 | | −16.1% |
| 1970 | 818 | | −8.7% |
| 1980 | 1,204 | | 47.2% |
| 1990 | 879 | | −27.0% |
| 2000 | 864 | | −1.7% |
| 2010 | 896 | | 3.7% |
| 2020 | 862 | | −3.8% |
Source: US Decennial Census

== History ==
The township was created by the Jefferson County Court of Common Pleas on May 12, 1818, from Madison Township and Pittsburgh Township. At the time, it also included the southern tier of modern Shelby Township running from an east–west line between sections 33 and 33 Twp. 4N Range 11E to the Switzerland county border. It is an overwhelmingly rural area and the cultivation of Burley tobacco has been a major cash crop since the late 1800s.

Milton Township has one incorporated town, Brooksburg, and the unincorporated Manville area. Four churches exist: the Manville Christian, Brooksburg Baptist, Brooksburg Methodist and Macedonia Baptist. The Pleasant Ridge Methodist Church, founded in 1839, disbanded in 2002.

A number of other churches have existed. The Milton Baptist Church was founded about a mile north of Manville on the East Prong of the Indian-Kentuck Creek in 1828 and was disbanded in 1836 after many members joined the Manville Christian Church in 1830. It reformed in 1840 and faded away about 1881. A church of the Reformed Latter Day Saints met in homes in the 1870s and a church was constructed on Halls Ridge, probably about around March 4, 1894, when property was deeded to Bishop E. F. Kelley of Lamoni, Iowa. The church property was sold to the original owners on November 28, 1904. A subsequent owner razed the building after buying it in 1913.

The Home Chapel Methodist Church was founded about 1830 on the Dry Fork of the Indian-Kentuck and was disbanded between 1965 and 1972. The McKendree Methodist Church was founded on Greenbriar Ridge in 1840 and disbanded in 1880, with most members joining Home Chapel. Armstrong Chapel, another Methodist body, was founded on the Ohio River about 1832 but was abandoned by 1856 when a shift in the river made it inaccessible. Most members joined Morris Chapel, which was founded on Lost Fork Road just north of modern State Road 56 in 1856 or 1859. It disbanded sometime in the 1900s and the building was razed in 1973, according to a plaque on the former church site. Bee Camp Baptist Church from 1872 to 1879, as shown by minutes of the Madison Baptist Association. Otterbein Chapel, a congregation of the United Brethren, formed in 1867 and a stone building was constructed for its use by November 9, 1869, when its upcoming dedicated was mentioned in the Madison Courier. However, the church apparently lost ownership of the building and on March 18, 1873, its trustees voted to buy the Eagle Hollow School House in nearby Madison.

Several post offices have operated in the township: Doe Run (June 28, 1892 – November 30, 1895; Home (January 18, 1830 – August 15, 1896); Manville (December 22, 1858 – April 30, 1907); Sugan (July 26, 1883 – February 15, 1904). The Manville Post Office was originally named Buena Vista and operated from August 19, 1847, through December 22, 1858, under that name. It was probably named after Nicholas Manville, the first post master after the name change. The Brooksburg post office opened under the named Brooksburgh on October 19, 1880. The name was changed to Brooksburg on March 31, 1893. Its mail has been handled by the Madison Post Office for many years.

The 1890 Indiana Business Directory and Gazetteer described Manville this way: "A postoffice in Milton township, Jefferson county, 7 miles northeast of Madison, the county seat, banking place, and shipping station. Population, 35. Mail, tri-weekly. Sina Manville, postmaster." Sina is short for Abyssinia, the full name of the postmaster.

== Geography ==
According to the 2010 census, the township has a total area of 35.07 square miles (90.8 km^{2}), of which 34.58 square miles (89.6 km^{2}) (or 98.60%) is land and 0.5 square miles (1.3 km^{2}) (or 1.43%) is water. The streams of Bee Camp Creek, Brushy Fork, Dog Run, Dry Fork, Mollys Run, Doe Run, East Prong Indian-Kentuck, West Fork Indian Kentuck Creek, Lost Fork, Little Brushy Fork, Little Doe Run, Puncheon Camp Creek, and Wolf Run run through this township. The East and West Forks of the Indian-Kentuck (more often called Indian-Kentucky in the 19th century), join at Manville.

=== Cities and towns ===
- Brooksburg

=== Unincorporated towns ===
- Manville

=== Adjacent townships ===
- Shelby Township (north)
- Pleasant Township, Switzerland County (northeast)
- Craig Township, Switzerland County (east)
- Madison Township (west)

=== Cemeteries ===
The township contains the following cemeteries: Armstrong, Brooks, Brown, Brooksburg, Brumbarger, Gale (moved to Armstrong cemetery) Joyce, Macedonia Baptist Church, Manville Christian Church, McKay, McKendry (Mistakenly called McHenry or McKenzie in some records) Milton (former Milton Baptist Church), Monroe (two Monroe family cemeteries), Morris Chapel (former Methodist Church), Pleasant Ridge (former Methodist Church), Tevis, Vaughn, Vernon (Vernon family cemetery, also known as Hankins) and Wilkins.

=== Major highways ===
- Indiana State Road 56

== Education ==
It is in the Madison Consolidated Schools school district.

The zoned MCS elementary school is Rykers Ridge Elementary School. The zoned secondary schools of the Madison district are Madison Junior High School and Madison Consolidated High School.
