= Chelsea, Indiana =

- Unincorporated community
- Location within Indiana Location within the United States
- Coordinates: 38°39′02″N 85°31′30″W
- Country: United States
- State: Indiana
- County: Jefferson
- Township: Saluda
- Elevation: 787 ft (240 m)
- ZIP code: 47138
- FIPS code: 18-12250
- GNIS feature ID: 432440

Chelsea is an unincorporated community in Saluda Township, Jefferson County, Indiana.

== History ==
A post office was established at Chelsea in 1883, and remained in operation until it was discontinued in 1903. The community was likely named directly or indirectly after Chelsea, London.

Chelsea was hit by a tornado on March 2, 2012, in which three people died. A fourth fatality occurred about one mile away in Paynesville.

== Geography ==
Chelsea is located on Indiana 62, between New Washington and Hanover.

== See also ==
- Tornado outbreak of March 2–3, 2012
