= Paynesville, Indiana =

- Unincorporated community
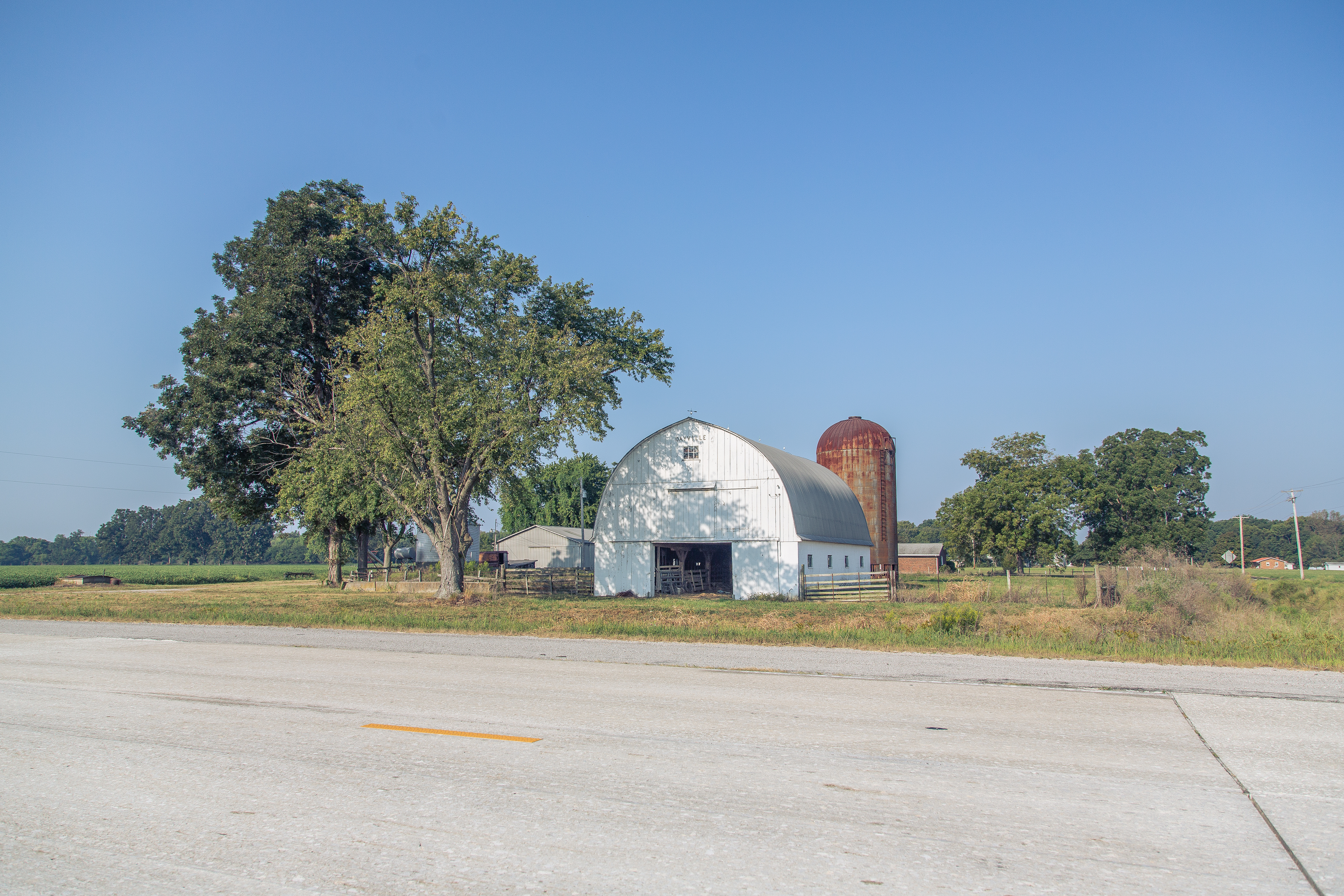

- Location within Indiana Location within the United States
- Coordinates: 38°37′16″N 85°29′36″W
- Country: United States
- State: Indiana
- County: Jefferson
- Township: Saluda
- Elevation: 768 ft (234 m)
- ZIP code: 47243
- FIPS code: 18-58518
- GNIS feature ID: 440949

Paynesville is an unincorporated community in Saluda Township, Jefferson County, Indiana.

== History ==
Paynesville was named in honor of Miller Payne, a pioneer.

Paynesville was hit by a tornado on March 2, 2012, and one person died. Three fatalities occurred about a mile away in Chelsea.

== See also ==
- Tornado outbreak of March 2–3, 2012
