= Dupont, Indiana =

- Town
- Town of Dupont
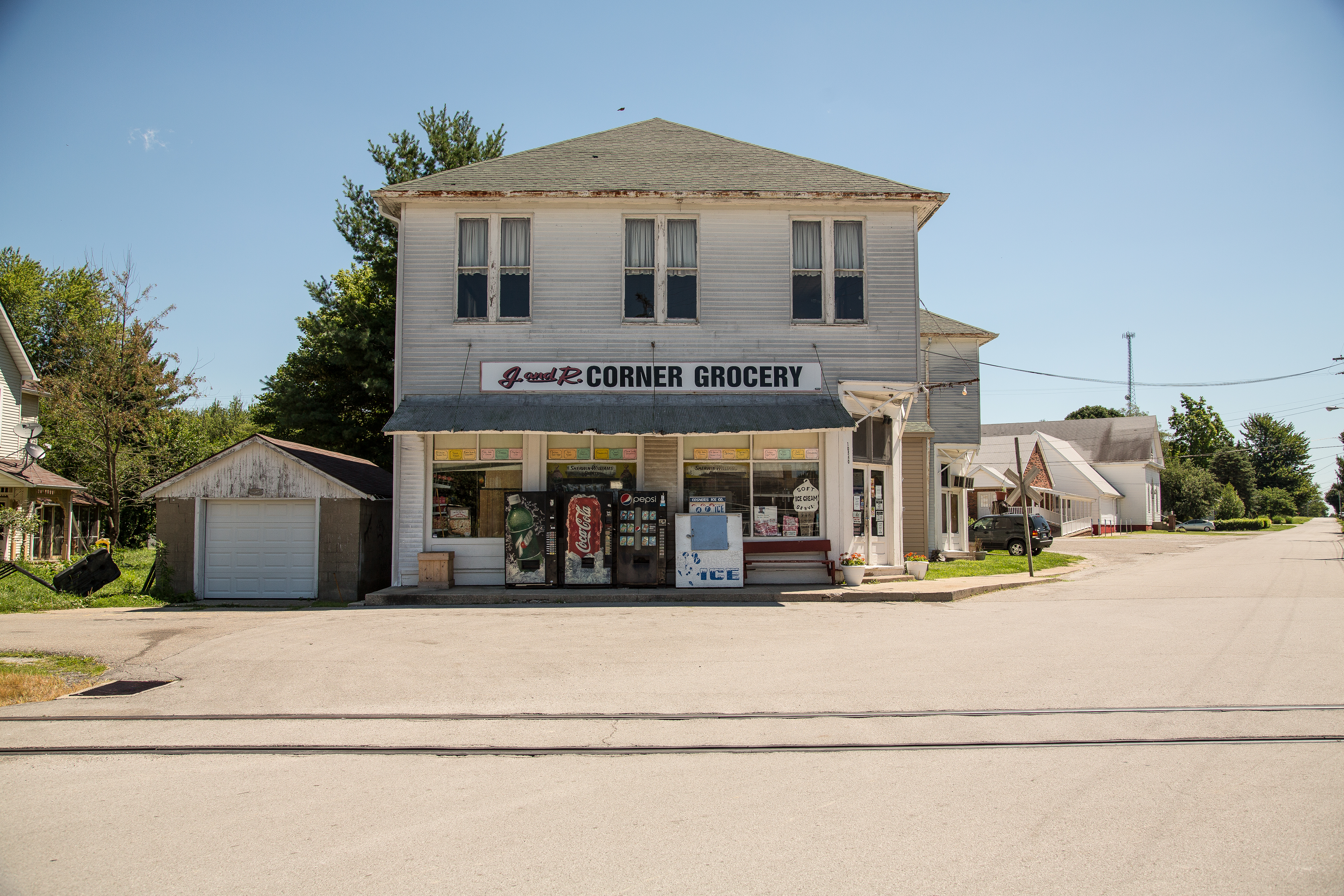

- Logo

- Location of Dupont in Jefferson County, Indiana.
- Coordinates: 38°53′29″N 85°31′00″W
- Country: United States
- State: Indiana
- County: Jefferson
- Township: Lancaster

Area
  - Total: 1.01 sq mi (2.61 km^{2})
  - Land: 1.01 sq mi (2.61 km^{2})
  - Water: 0 sq mi (0.00 km^{2})
- Elevation: 774 ft (236 m)

Population (2020)
  - Total: 343
  - Density: 340.0/sq mi (131.29/km^{2})
- Time zone: UTC-5 (EST)
  - Summer (DST): UTC-5 (EST)
- ZIP code: 47231
- Area code: 812
- FIPS code: 18-19180
- GNIS feature ID: 2396913
- Website: www.dupontindiana.com

Dupont is a town in Lancaster Township, Jefferson County, Indiana, United States. As of the 2020 census, Dupont had a population of 343.

== History ==
Dupont was founded in 1849. It was named after the Du Pont family.

Dupont was one of the towns visited by John Hunt Morgan on his raid.

== Geography ==
According to the 2010 census, Dupont has a total area of 1.02 square miles (2.64 km^{2}), all land.

== Demographics ==
Historical population
Census	Pop.	Note	%±
1880	192		—
1970	357		—
1980	392		9.8%
1990	391		−0.3%
2000	392		0.3%
2010	339		−13.5%
2020	343		1.2%
U.S. Decennial Census

=== 2010 census ===
As of the census of 2010, there were 339 people, 117 households, and 87 families living in the town. The population density was 332.4 inhabitants per square mile (128.3/km^{2}). There were 148 housing units at an average density of 145.1 per square mile (56.0/km^{2}). The racial makeup of the town was 95.9% White, 2.1% African American, and 2.1% from other races. Hispanic or Latino of any race were 2.7% of the population.

There were 117 households, of which 45.3% had children under the age of 18 living with them, 50.4% were married couples living together, 14.5% had a female householder with no husband present, 9.4% had a male householder with no wife present, and 25.6% were non-families. 23.1% of all households were made up of individuals, and 8.6% had someone living alone who was 65 years of age or older. The average household size was 2.90 and the average family size was 3.26.

The median age in the town was 33.9 years. 31.6% of residents were under the age of 18; 9% were between the ages of 18 and 24; 23.6% were from 25 to 44; 25.6% were from 45 to 64; and 10% were 65 years of age or older. The gender makeup of the town was 51.9% male and 48.1% female.

=== 2000 census ===
As of the census of 2000, there were 392 people, 139 households, and 97 families living in the town. The population density was 382.1 inhabitants per square mile (147.5/km^{2}). There were 146 housing units at an average density of 142.3 per square mile (54.9/km^{2}). The racial makeup of the town was 95.92% White, 1.53% African American, 0.26% Native American, 1.02% Asian, 0.51% from other races, and 0.77% from two or more races. Hispanic or Latino of any race were 2.30% of the population.

There were 139 households, out of which 44.6% had children under the age of 18 living with them, 49.6% were married couples living together, 14.4% had a female householder with no husband present, and 29.5% were non-families. 22.3% of all households were made up of individuals, and 10.8% had someone living alone who was 65 years of age or older. The average household size was 2.76 and the average family size was 3.23.

In the town, the population was spread out, with 33.9% under the age of 18, 8.2% from 18 to 24, 31.4% from 25 to 44, 16.6% from 45 to 64, and 9.9% who were 65 years of age or older. The median age was 31 years. For every 100 females, there were 94.1 males. For every 100 females age 18 and over, there were 89.1 males.

The median income for a household in the town was $37,188, and the median income for a family was $32,083. Males had a median income of $32,188 versus $23,333 for females. The per capita income for the town was $13,966. About 16.8% of families and 19.3% of the population were below the poverty line, including 25.7% of those under age 18 and none of those age 65 or over.

== Education ==
It is in the Madison Consolidated Schools school district.

The zoned MCS elementary school for most of Dupont is Anderson Elementary School, while part of Dupont is zoned to Deputy Elementary School. The zoned secondary schools of the Madison district are Madison Junior High School and Madison Consolidated High School.
