= Madison Township, Jefferson County, Indiana =

Madison Township
- Township
- Location in Jefferson County
- Coordinates: 38°46′45″N 85°23′06″W
- Country: United States
- State: Indiana
- County: Jefferson

Government
  - Type: Indiana township

Area
  - Total: 58 sq mi (150 km^{2})
  - Land: 57.41 sq mi (148.7 km^{2})
  - Water: 0.59 sq mi (1.5 km^{2}) 1.02%
- Elevation: 915 ft (279 m)

Population (2020)
  - Total: 18,007
  - Density: 313.7/sq mi (121.1/km^{2})
- GNIS feature ID: 0453593

Madison Township is one of ten townships in Jefferson County, Indiana, United States. As of the 2020 census, its population was 18,007 (up from 17,415 at 2010) and it contained 8,264 housing units.

Historical population
Census	Pop.	Note	%±
1890	13,027		—
1900	11,761		−9.7%
1910	10,013		−14.9%
1920	10,762		7.5%
1930	10,816		0.5%
1940	11,408		5.5%
1950	12,667		11.0%
1960	14,348		13.3%
1970	15,628		8.9%
1980	16,225		3.8%
1990	16,117		−0.7%
2000	16,770		4.1%
2010	17,415		3.8%
2020	18,007		3.4%
Source: US Decennial Census

== History ==
It was established as one of three townships when Jefferson County commenced operations on February 11, 1811. Before this, the area belonged to Madison Township in Clark County. With the inclusion of the city of Madison, it boasts the highest population among Jefferson County's 10 townships.

Outside of the City of Madison, the township has the following active churches: Ryker's Ridge Baptist Church, which was founded in 1840, and Wirt Baptist Church, founded in 1818 as Harbert's Creek Baptist Church. Extinct churches in the country include Bee Camp Baptist (1872-ca.1879), Center Presbyterian (1831-ca. 1850), Graysville Methodist (ca. 1837-ca. 1870?), Mt. Zion Methodist (1868–1972), Olive Branch Methodist (1835–1938), Otterbein Chapel United Brethren (1867-after 1916), Ryker's Ridge Presbyterian (1831-ca. 1837)

There is one public school outside of the city, Ryker's Ridge Elementary School. It was originally the Central School, a 1-12 school, which had its first high school graduation in 1878 and last in 1961, when it was consolidated with the Madison system.

The township has two active post offices, Madison and North Madison. Madison was established in 1812 and North Madison on Jan. 13,1848.

Madison has also had the following post offices: Bee Camp, (Feb. 18, 1880-Feb. 15, 1905) China: Madison/Shelby Twp. Jan. 30, 1833-Nov. 29, 1838. Moses H. Wilder; Feb., 3, 1879-May 2, 1881, Feb. 23, 1882-Feb. 28, 1902 (to Madison) postmaster, Jacob Thiennes. The first post office was likely in Madison Twp. The next two renditions were in Shelby Twp. Eagle Springs (Oct. 19, 1868-Dec. 5, 1870); Stoney Point (July 26, 1853 – May 31, 1906); Waldinger (Dec. 30, 1897-Apr. 15, 1902); Wirt (Dec. 22, 1834-June 19, 1839) and (June 24, 1856 – June 30, 1950; Zion (Sept. 13, 1895–July 15, 1899).

Lemuel Allen Farm and Mathias Wolf Farm were listed on the National Register of Historic Places in 2016.

== Geography ==
According to the 2010 census, the township has a total area of 58 square miles (150 km^{2}), of which 57.41 square miles (148.7 km^{2}) (or 98.98%) is land and 0.59 square miles (1.5 km^{2}) (or 1.02%) is water. The streams of Bee Camp Creek, Big Clifty Creek, Crooked Creek, Deans Branch, Dry Fork, Eagle Hollow Creek, Little Clifty Creek, Little Crooked Creek, Razor's Fork, Schnapps Creek, Turkey Run (usually called Turkey Branch locally), West Fork of the Indian-Kentuck Creek and Wolf Run run through this township.

=== Cities and towns ===
- Madison (the county seat)

=== Extinct towns ===
- North Madison
- Ringwald
- Wirt
- Wirt Station

=== Adjacent townships ===
- Monroe Township (north)
- Shelby Township (northeast)
- Milton Township (east)
- Hanover Township (southwest)
- Republican Township (west)
- Smyrna Township (west)
- Lancaster Township (northwest)

=== Cemeteries ===
The township contains these cemeteries: Booth, Craig, Bramwell, Brisbane, Brown-Bacon, Bryner, Fairmount, Graysville (Miller), Higbie, Indiana Veterans Memorial Cemetery, Jewish, Lund, Minor, Monroe, Olive Branch, Olive Branch, Paul, Pleasant Ridge (Reul), Rykers Ridge Baptist (Old and New), Saint Anthony Roman Catholic, Saint Josephs Roman Catholic, Saint Patricks Roman Catholic, Springdale, Thomas, Underwood, Wirt Baptist and Woodfill.

The Baxter, Bayless, Big Creek, Craig (another Craig Cemetery), Marble Corner, Marble Valley, Monroe and Mt. Monroe cemeteries were relocated to an area just south of Fairmount Cemetery in 1941 when the former Jefferson Proving Ground was created. Bayless was originally in the northern part of the township. The Baxter, Big Creek, Marble Valley, Monroe and Mt. Monroe cemeteries had been in Monroe Township. Marble Corner was relocated from Shelby Township, Ripley County. Some graves from St. Magdalene cemetery were moved from the original site in the same township to St. Patrick's cemetery. The Lund family cemetery, originally located near the Ohio River was moved to the Bayless Cemetery about 1951 during the construction of the Indiana-Kentucky Electric Corp. power plant. Many of the graves in the Old Third Street Cemetery in downtown Madison relocated to Fairmount Cemetery on the Madison hilltop in the 1800s.

=== Major highways ===
- U.S. Route 421
- Indiana State Road 7
- Indiana State Road 56
- Indiana State Road 62

=== Airports and landing strips ===
- Madison Municipal Airport

== Education ==
It is in the Madison Consolidated Schools school district.

The zoned MCS elementary schools that cover sections of the township are Anderson, Lydia Middleton, and Rykers Ridge. The zoned secondary schools of the Madison district are Madison Junior High School and Madison Consolidated High School.
