= China, Indiana =

- Unincorporated community
- Location within Indiana Location within the United States
- Coordinates: 38°49′33″N 85°20′18″W
- Country: United States
- State: Indiana
- County: Jefferson
- Township: Shelby
- Elevation: 571 ft (174 m)
- ZIP code: 47250
- FIPS code: 18-12520
- GNIS feature ID: 432479

China is an unincorporated community in Shelby Township, Jefferson County, Indiana. It spans Shelby and Madison Townships and was for years largely defined by the existence of a general store in Madison Township and the former St. Anthony's Catholic Church in Shelby township. Razor's Fork runs between the two sections. Indiana State Road 62 runs parallel to Razor's Fork in Madison Township, and then crosses the stream and heads north to Canaan.

A post office called China was established in 1833, and remained in operation until 1902. The origin of the name China is disputed. Some say the community derives its name from Father Chine, while others believe the presence of chinaberries caused the name to be selected.

== Geography ==
China sits on the western side of Razor's Fork, a small stream, just before it enters the West Fork of the Indian-Kentuck Creek.
