= Kent, Indiana =

Kent, Indiana may refer to:

- Kent, Jefferson County, Indiana
- Kentland, Indiana
