= Swanville =

Swanville can refer to a place in the United States:

- Swanville, Indiana
- Swanville, Maine
- Swanville, Minnesota
- Swanville Township, Morrison County, Minnesota
