= Lancaster, Jefferson County, Indiana =

- Unincorporated community
- Location within Indiana Location within the United States
- Coordinates: 38°49′53″N 85°31′07″W
- Country: United States
- State: Indiana
- County: Jefferson
- Township: Lancaster
- Elevation: 715 ft (218 m)
- ZIP code: 47250
- FIPS code: 18-41922
- GNIS feature ID: 437590

Lancaster is an unincorporated community in Lancaster Township, Jefferson County, Indiana.

== History ==
Lancaster was platted on October 5, 1815, by David Hillis and William McFarland. The plat established 128 lots, reserving some for the construction of a courthouse, market house, and place of public worship. McFarland was a county judge and Hillis, a popular local politician, later became lieutenant governor of Indiana.

The Lancaster Post Office operated from March 16, 1830, through August 30, 1839. Service went to Dupont, then to Republican and Franklin Mills, before returning to Lancaster on August 19, 1841. It closed on March 15, 1907.

Before the Civil War, the area was a center of anti-slavery activity. The Neal's Creek Anti-Slavery Baptist Church, founded in 1846, moved to Lancaster in 1847. It later became known as the College Hill Baptist Church and disappeared by 1879. The Eleutherian College, founded in 1848, was the second co-educational, integrated college to open in the United States. It accepted black and white students until the Civil War when it stopped accepting blacks. It closed and in 1874 then reopened as a private high school and normal school that same year. It operated until 1888 when it was purchased by Lancaster Township and the stone college building was used as an elementary school until 1937.

Lancaster was shown with 119 occupants in the 1880 census, but was not separately enumerated in any other census.

An 1889 publication gave this description: "LANCASTER, Lancaster township, is in section thirty-three, town V north, range IX east. Post office, several stores, one church, a fine merchant mill and school-house. Situated at the confluence of Big Creek and Middle Fork, on the north side of Big Creek. College Hill is just across Big Creek from Lancaster."

The 1890 Indiana Business Directory described it as follows: "Is located on Big creek in Lancaster township Jefferson county, 10 miles northwest of Madison, the county seat and banking town. Middle Fork, 3 miles east on the J. M. & I.R.R., is the shipping station. Population, 200. Mail daily. Walter McElroy, postmaster." It had a flour mills, three general stores, and a hay-rake manufacturer.

== Churches ==
There have been several churches in the town, but their histories are ambiguous. A Christian church was founded in 1862, according to local accounts, but the church trustees sold the property on April 2, 1889. According to George Cottman's History of Lancaster Township, Christians took over a building that had been used by a Methodist congregation, that was failing. The Christians razed the building at an unknown date. They deeded it to J.E. McConnell, who then donated it to the Methodists, who had reorganized. However, this account also says the Christians were followed by the Presbyterians, so it is unclear when the church building was demolished.

A Methodist congregation which acquired land southwest of the town on February 16, 1850, may have been the same one operating in Lancaster in 1861. But the trustees of the Lancaster Methodist Church sold their property to a private individual on March 14, 1863. Jefferson County deeds show the McConnells sold the property to trustees for a Methodist church on January 3, 1906, and this body was still active in the 1920s.

The church that was originally named Lancaster Presbyterian Church was founded in what is now Monroe Township, which was then part of Lancaster Township. The church divided in 1839 with Monroe as a New School Presbyterian and Lancaster an Old School church, both meeting in Monroe Township. Another church called Lancaster Presbyterian was founded about 1855. A biographical sketch of Charles Lee, who was licensed to preach by the Madison Presbyterian in 1855 and ordained the same year, spent his first four years in the ministry serving Graham and Lancaster Presbyterian Church.

The Lancaster Baptist Church was formed on July 30, 1859, at Byfield's schoolhouse, according to a history of Lancaster Township. A new building, constructed in 1900, is in use by the Bible Baptist Temple Church, a different body.
