= Middlefork, Indiana =

Middlefork is the name of the following places in the U.S. state of Indiana:

- Middlefork, Clinton County, Indiana
- Middlefork, Jefferson County, Indiana
