= Barbersville, Indiana =

- Extinct town
- Location within Indiana Location within the United States
- Coordinates: 38°54′21″N 85°16′51″W
- Country: United States
- State: Indiana
- County: Jefferson
- Township: Shelby
- Elevation: 899 ft (274 m)
- ZIP code: 47250
- FIPS code: 18-12520
- GNIS feature ID: 430483

Barbersville was an unincorporated town in Shelby Township, Jefferson County, Indiana.

== History ==
Barbersville was probably preceded by the town of Edinburgh, which was platted on November 3, 1815, and recorded in the Jefferson County deed records. No legal land definitions were included, but a rough map showed the land of the proprietors, Wilson Buchanan, George Benefiel, and James Whitton, who were neighboring landowners, all of whom had land in the Barbersville area. They laid out 64 lots around a public square, which was filed in Jefferson County Deed Book A page 174.

The Barbersville Post Office operated from December 7, 1826, to November 19, 1838, and then was transferred to nearby Buchanan's Station in Ripley County. Mail service was then provided by the Canaan Post Office in Shelby Township. The government re-established the Barberville office on June 27, 1848, and it operated until May 31, 1906, when service was transferred to Canaan.

The first postmaster, Timothy Barber, was licensed by the Jefferson County Commissioners to sell foreign merchandise (such as sugar and coffee) in May 1829 and again in May 1832. Enoch and Thomas Bray platted the town on December 18, 1848, with fifteen lots and three named streets including Main Street (60 feet wide), Broadway (50 feet wide), and Main Cross. During the 1870s, most of the lots came into the possession of area resident William Buchanan.

The Historical Atlas of Indiana, published in 1876, lists Barbersville's population as 100 in 1870. But it was never separately enumerated in the censuses, so this may reflect the number of people with Barbersville addresses. William H. operated the store with the longest history, opening in 1857 and closing with his death in 1911. His goods were auctioned on August 8, 1911, according to William Kramer's Shelby Township history.

The 1890 Indiana Business Directory and Gazetteer described the town as follows: "A village of 50 population located Shelby township, Jefferson county, 15 miles northeast of Madison, the county seat, shipping point, and banking town. Grain, livestock, hay and fruit are the shipments. Mail, tri-weekly. W.H.H. Benefiel."

A one-room school was operating in Barbersville by December 24, 1890, when the school year ended, according to the January 6, 1891, issue of the Daily Democrat. It apparently closed by the 1915/16 school year, as a county school list for that year did not include it.

The town had a corn mill, according to a Madison Courier article dated January 31, 1895, which said the mill "grinds every Friday and Saturday when not too bad" and was under the operation of Milford Smock. The town also had a justice of the peace court, which lasted at least into the latter part of the nineteenth century. The Madison Courier reported in 1895 that "Squire Van Antwerp's Court will convene September 24." William Benefiel was listed as involved in a "General Store, Implements, Fertilizers and Live Stock."

In the twentieth century, the area was severely depopulated, and according to aerial photographs there are only three residences or other buildings along the Barbersville Road for a mile in either direction, including the area in which the town was once located.
