= Volga, Indiana =

- Unincorporated community
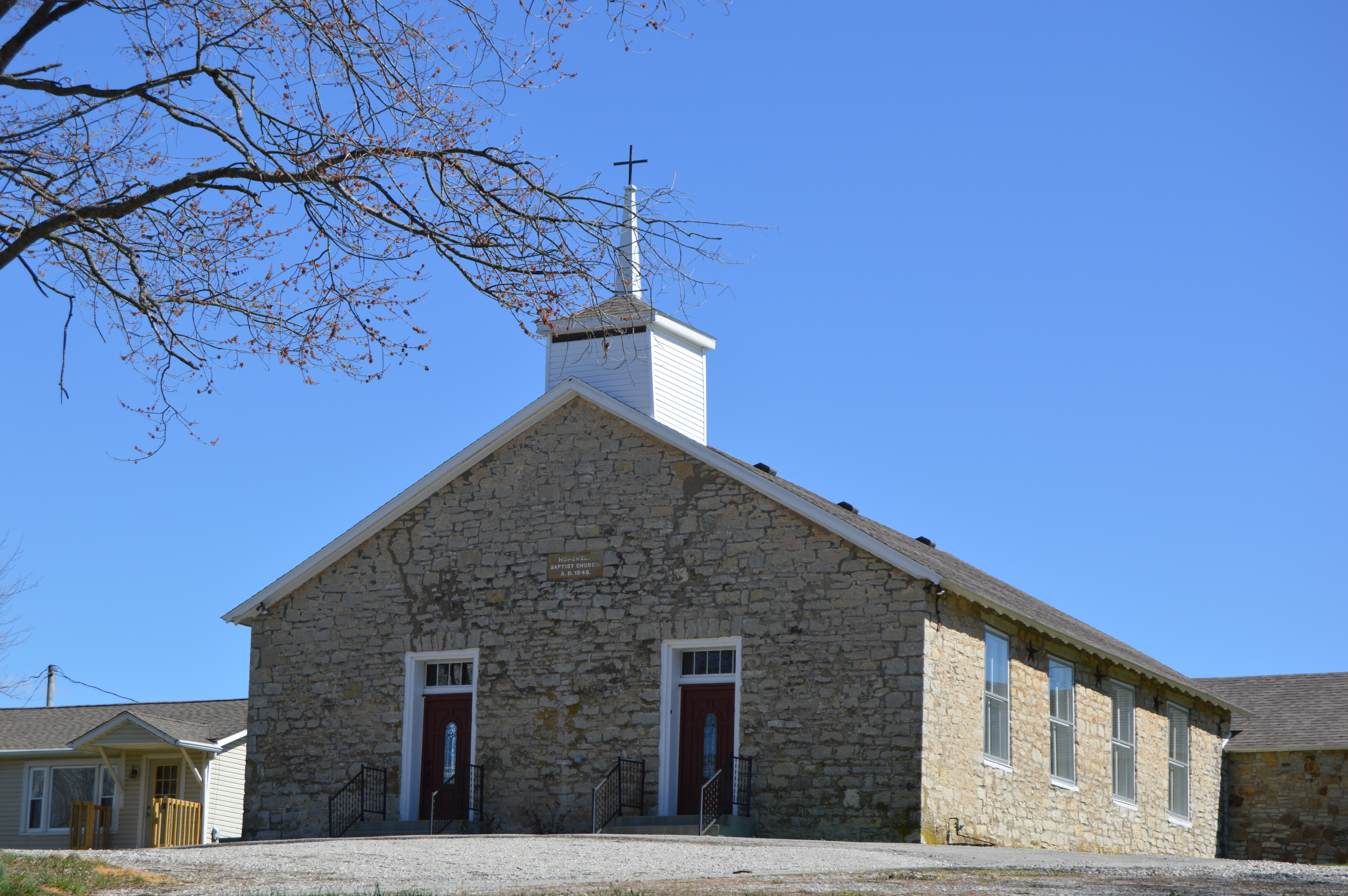
- Hopewell Baptist Church

- Location within Indiana Location within the United States
- Coordinates: 38°47′02″N 85°31′05″W
- Country: United States
- State: Indiana
- County: Jefferson
- Township: Smyrna
- Elevation: 686 ft (209 m)
- ZIP code: 47250
- FIPS code: 18-79244
- GNIS feature ID: 445316

Volga is an unincorporated community in Smyrna Township, Jefferson County, Indiana. The name's origin is not known with certainty, but is believed to have been adopted from Volga in Russia.

== History ==
Volga was not platted as a town and was never separately enumerated in federal censuses. It was defined primarily by the existence of a post office and a school. The post office operated from May 29, 1856, until July 14, 1904. The first postmaster was William J. Chambers.

School trustees purchased a tract in the area on March 11, 1844, for the erection of a school house. A school house that was still standing in 1989 was built in 1870. In the immediate neighborhood is the Hopewell Baptist Church, a stone building constructed in 1848. The History of Hopewell Baptist Church shows that the organizing meeting was held on May 16, 1829, at the house of Robert Ford. The first worship was held in July 1829 at Volga.

The 1890 Indiana Gazetteer and Business Directory provided the following description: "A village of 100 inhabitants in Smyrna township, Jefferson county, 9 miles northwest of Madison, Jefferson county, the county seat, nearest shipping point and bank location. Mail tri-weekly. George Wallace, postmaster."

== Geography ==
Volga is located on the north side of Harbert's Creek, which flows from east to west, on the Deputy Pike at its junction with county road 700W.
