= Swanville, Indiana =

- Unincorporated community
- Location within Indiana Location within the United States
- Coordinates: 38°41′11″N 85°33′31″W
- Country: United States
- State: Indiana
- County: Jefferson
- Township: Republican
- Elevation: 702 ft (214 m)
- ZIP code: 47138
- FIPS code: 18-74500
- GNIS feature ID: 444470

Swanville is an unincorporated community in Republican Township, Jefferson County, Indiana.

A post office was established at Swanville in 1847, and remained in operation until it was discontinued in 1907.
