= Saluda, Indiana =

- Unincorporated community
- Location within Indiana Location within the United States
- Coordinates: 38°39′02″N 85°29′06″W
- Country: United States
- State: Indiana
- County: Jefferson
- Township: Saluda
- Elevation: 774 ft (236 m)
- ZIP code: 47243
- FIPS code: 18-67644
- GNIS feature ID: 446878

Saluda is an unincorporated community in Saluda Township, Jefferson County, Indiana.

== History ==
Saluda took its name from Saluda Township. A post office was established at Saluda in 1828, and remained in operation until it was discontinued in 1903.
