= Republican Township, Jefferson County, Indiana =

Republican Township
- Township
- Location in Jefferson County
- Coordinates: 38°43′48″N 85°33′32″W
- Country: United States
- State: Indiana
- County: Jefferson

Government
  - Type: Indiana township

Area
  - Total: 27.55 sq mi (71.4 km^{2})
  - Land: 27.44 sq mi (71.1 km^{2})
  - Water: 0.11 sq mi (0.28 km^{2}) 0.40%
- Elevation: 741 ft (226 m)

Population (2020)
  - Total: 1,600
  - Density: 58/sq mi (23/km^{2})
- GNIS feature ID: 0453786

Republican Township is one of ten townships in Jefferson County, Indiana, United States. As of the 2020 census, its population was 1,600 and it contained 663 housing units.

Republican Township was created on March 12, 1817, by the Jefferson County Common Pleas Court. It has had the following post offices, which are no longer in operation: Hargan (June 4, 1884 – July 29, 1898); Ramsey's Mills (Dec. 19, 1832-Jan. 14, 1848); Swanville (June 10, 1847-Oct. 23, 1866) and (Jan. 8, 1867-Jan. 15, 1907). There is no active post office in the township.

Ramseys Mills Post Office was renamed Kent, which operated from Jan. 14, 1848 until March 26, 1965, when mail service was transferred to Madison.

Its active churches include the Kent Baptist, Christian and Methodist churches. Past churches include the Ebenezer Methodist (ca. 1840-?): New Liberty Methodist (ca. 1900-1995/90), Providence Methodist (ca. 1830-?), Sharon Hill Presbyterian (1845-after 1945); White River Baptist (1811-1886/87) and White River Christian (founded as a New Light church in 1817, moved to Kent where the Kent Christian Church is its successor).

Historical population
Census	Pop.	Note	%±
1890	872		—
1900	859		−1.5%
1910	871		1.4%
1920	887		1.8%
1930	729		−17.8%
1940	724		−0.7%
1950	719		−0.7%
1960	880		22.4%
1970	1,061		20.6%
1980	1,447		36.4%
1990	1,468		1.5%
2000	1,534		4.5%
2010	1,599		4.2%
2020	1,600		0.1%
Source: US Decennial Census

== Geography ==
According to the 2010 census, the township has a total area of 27.55 square miles (71.4 km^{2}), of which 27.44 square miles (71.1 km^{2}) (or 99.60%) is land and 0.11 square miles (0.28 km^{2}) (or 0.40%) is water. The streams of Big Spring Creek, Chicken Run, Ramsey Creek and Thompson Branch run through this township.

=== Unincorporated towns ===
- Kent
- Swanville

=== Adjacent townships ===
- Smyrna Township (northeast)
- Hanover Township (east)
- Madison Township (east)
- Saluda Township (southeast)
- Lexington Township, Scott County (southwest)
- Graham Township (northwest)

=== Cemeteries ===
The township contains cemeteries: Blankenship, Kent, Landon, Liberty, Lloyd, Scotland, Sharon Hill, Slippery Point and White River.

=== Major highways ===
- Indiana State Road 56
- Indiana State Road 256
- Indiana State Road 356

=== Airports and landing strips ===
- Wilkersons Airport

== Education ==
The school district is Southwestern Jefferson County Consolidated Schools. The comprehensive high school is Southwestern High School.
