= Lemuel Allen Farm =

- U.S. National Register of Historic Places
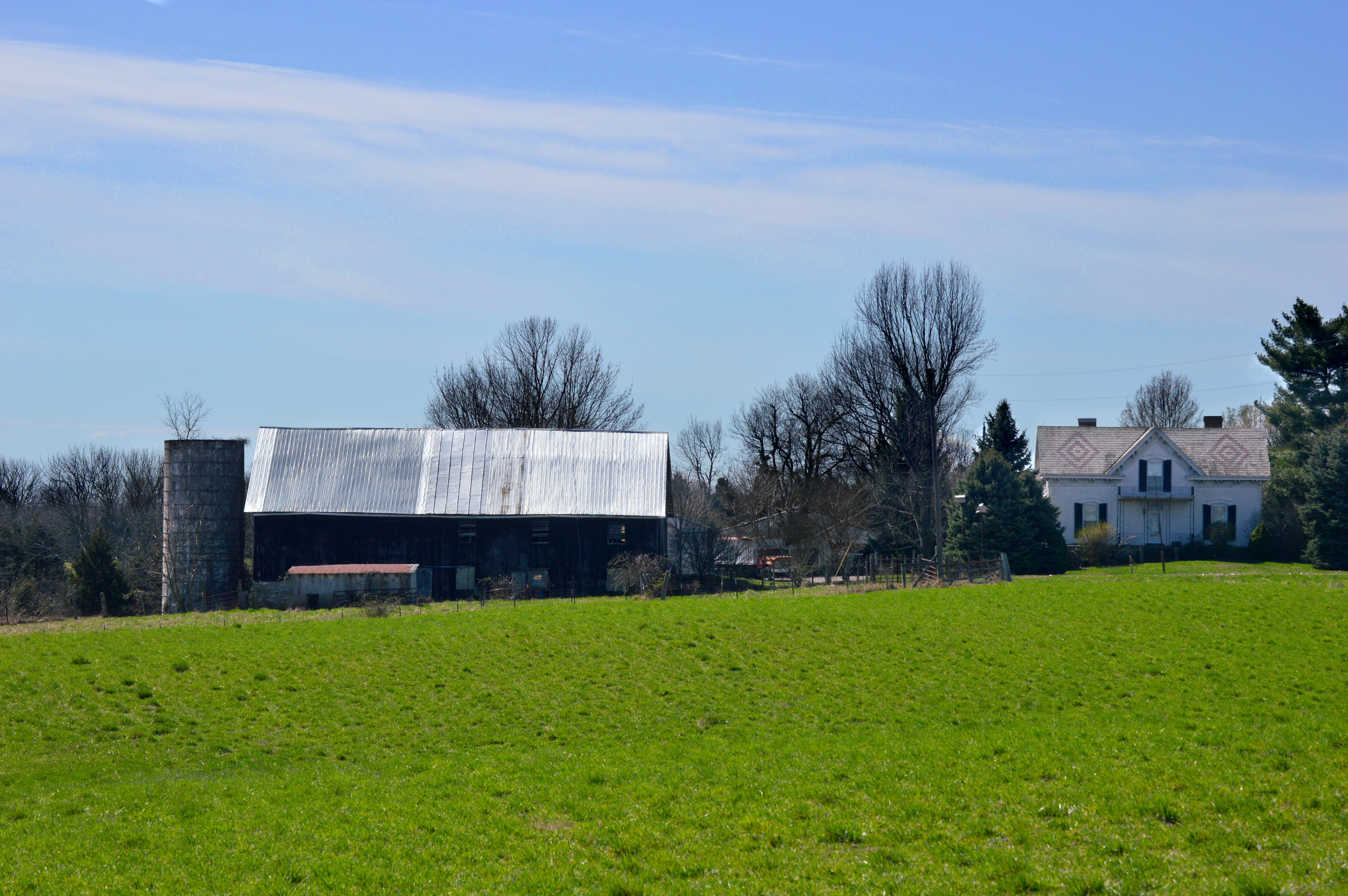
- Lemuel Allen Farm, March 2012

- Location within Indiana Location within the United States
- Location: 3768 E. Pleasant Ridge Rd., Madison Township, Jefferson County, Indiana
- Coordinates: 38°45′32″N 85°19′04″W
- Area: 13.1 acres (5.3 ha)
- Built: 1877
- Architectural style: Italianate
- NRHP reference No.: 16000334
- Added to NRHP: June 7, 2016

Lemuel Allen Farm is a historic home and farm located in Madison Township, Jefferson County, Indiana. The farmhouse was built in 1877, and is a 1 1/2-story, central passage plan, vernacular Italianate style brick dwelling. It features a side-gabled roof sheathed in slate shingles with triple-embedded and diamond patterns in red on either side of the front-gable on the façade. Also on the property are the contributing privy and large, transverse-frame basement barn, built around 1877, and a silo, the workshop, the granary, the garage, the feed shed, and a tool shed, all dated to the 1920s.

It was listed on the National Register of Historic Places in 2016.
