= Smyrna Township, Jefferson County, Indiana =

Smyrna Township
- Township
- Location in Jefferson County
- Coordinates: 38°47′35″N 85°30′33″W
- Country: United States
- State: Indiana
- County: Jefferson

Government
  - Type: Indiana township

Area
  - Total: 25.95 sq mi (67.2 km^{2})
  - Land: 25.93 sq mi (67.2 km^{2})
  - Water: 0.02 sq mi (0.052 km^{2}) 0.08%
- Elevation: 761 ft (232 m)

Population (2020)
  - Total: 1,116
  - Density: 43.04/sq mi (16.62/km^{2})
- GNIS feature ID: 0453855

Smyrna Township is one of ten townships in Jefferson County, Indiana, United States. As of the 2020 census, its population was 1,116 and it contained 453 housing units.

Created on June 16, 1847, by the Jefferson County Commissioners, Smyrna was the last of Jefferson County's 10 townships to be formed. It is largely rural with only small unincorporated areas as population centers.

No post offices operate in the township.

The following post offices once operated in the township: Creswell (May 29, 1856-Nov. 30, 1892) and (June 6, 1893-Sept. 13, 1902); Volga (May 29, 1856 – July 14, 1904); Wakefield (July 8, 1899-Feb. 15, 1905). 6.

Historical population
Census	Pop.	Note	%±
1890	867		—
1900	810		−6.6%
1910	756		−6.7%
1920	792		4.8%
1930	634		−19.9%
1940	644		1.6%
1950	649		0.8%
1960	726		11.9%
1970	815		12.3%
1980	886		8.7%
1990	930		5.0%
2000	1,065		14.5%
2010	1,096		2.9%
2020	1,116		1.8%
Source: US Decennial Census

== Geography ==
According to the 2010 census, the township has a total area of 25.95 square miles (67.2 km^{2}), of which 25.93 square miles (67.2 km^{2}) (or 99.92%) is land and 0.02 square miles (0.052 km^{2}) (or 0.08%) is water. The streams of Goose Creek, Harberts Creek and Hensley Creek run through this township.

=== Unincorporated towns ===
- Neavill Grove
- Smyrna
- Volga

=== Adjacent townships ===
- Lancaster Township (north)
- Monroe Township (northeast)
- Madison Township (east)
- Republican Township (southwest)
- Graham Township (west)

=== Cemeteries ===
The township contains the following cemeteries: Brown (Sauer farm) Ford, Hopewell, Kinnear, Lawler (1) and Lawler (2), Lowe, McKay-Stites, Neavill, Shiloh, and Smyrna Presbyterian.

=== Major highways ===
- Indiana State Road 7

== Education ==
The school district is Southwestern Jefferson County Consolidated Schools. The comprehensive high school is Southwestern High School.
