= Mathias Wolf Farm =

- U.S. National Register of Historic Places
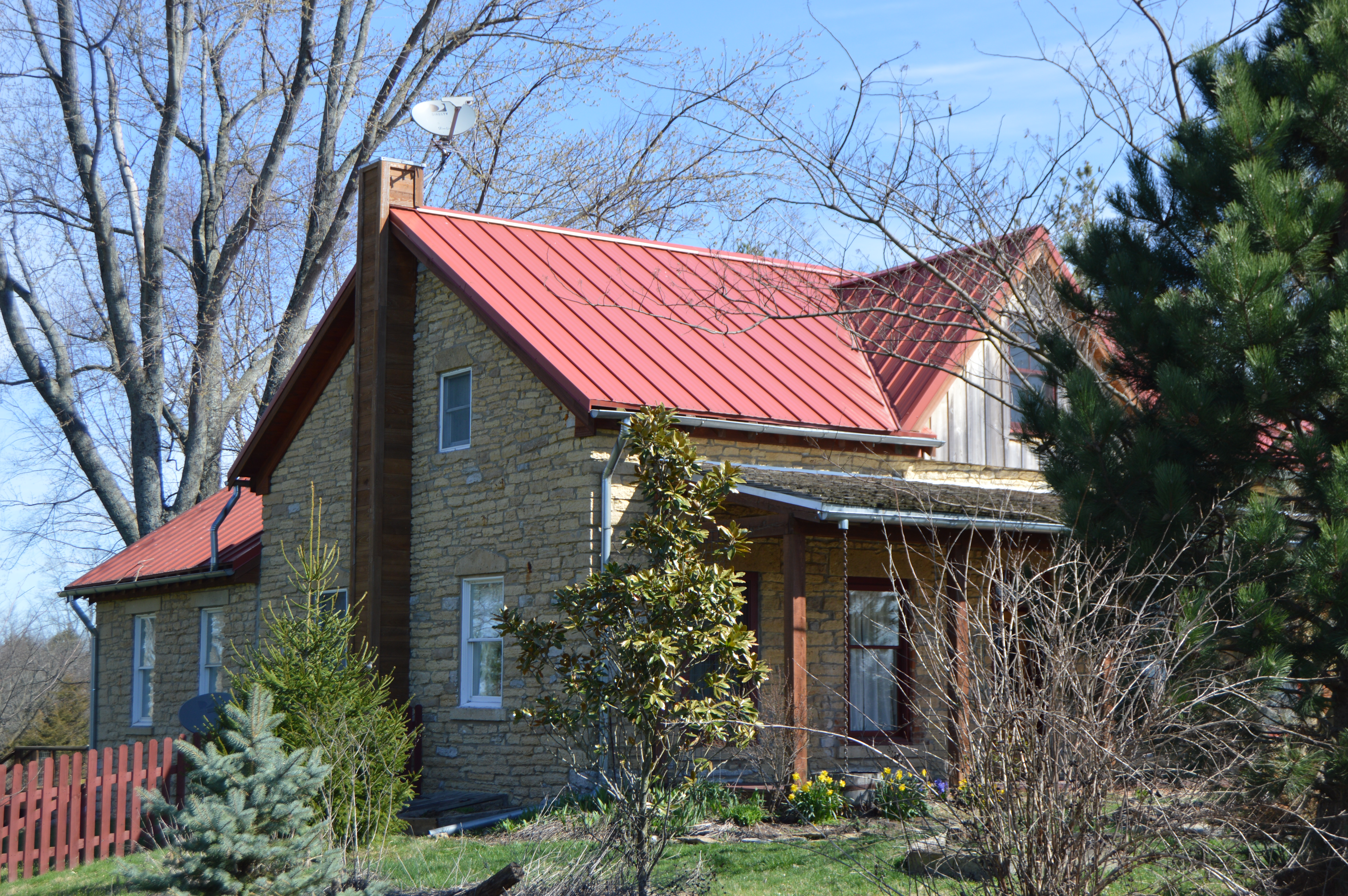
- Mathias Wolf Farmhouse, March 2016

- Location within Indiana Location within the United States
- Location: 4137 E. Pleasant Ridge Rd., Madison Township, Jefferson County, Indiana
- Coordinates: 38°45′45″N 85°18′38″W
- Area: 3 acres (1.2 ha)
- Built: c. 1854
- Architectural style: Gothic Revival
- NRHP reference No.: 16000335
- Added to NRHP: June 7, 2016

Mathias Wolf Farm is a historic home and farm located in Madison Township, Jefferson County, Indiana. The farmhouse was built about 1854, and is a 1 1/2-story, central passage plan, vernacular Gothic Revival style limestone dwelling. Also on the property are the contributing smokehouse, outhouse, transverse-frame barn, and shed.

It was listed on the National Register of Historic Places in 2016.
