= Eleutherian College =

School in Lancaster, Indiana, USA

- Eleutherian College Classroom and Chapel Building
- U.S. National Register of Historic Places
- U.S. National Historic Landmark
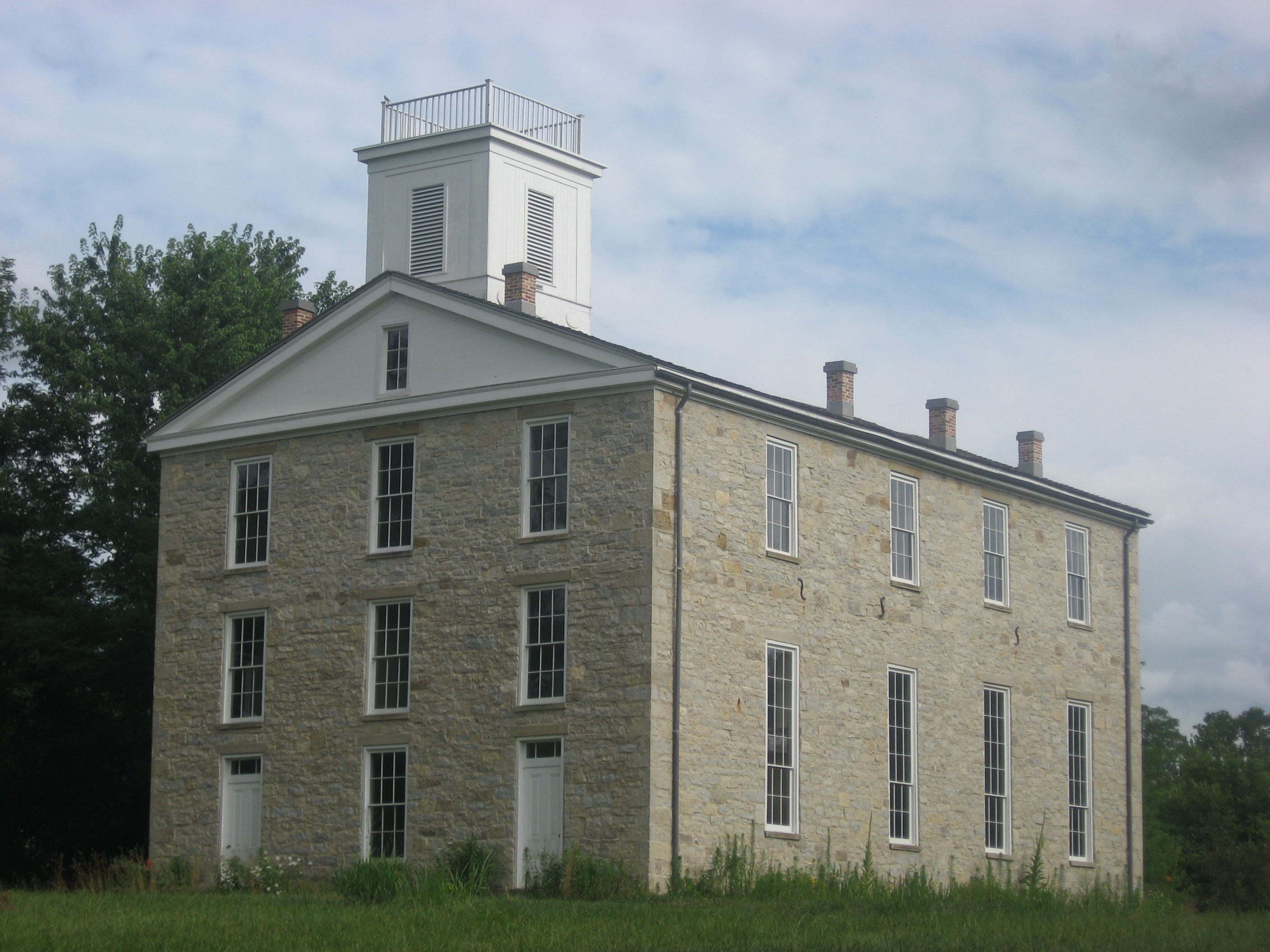
- Eleutherian College and Chapel Building

- Location within Indiana Location within the United States
- Location: Lancaster, Indiana
- Coordinates: 38°49′51″N 85°30′59″W
- Architectural style: Greek Revival
- NRHP reference No.: 93001410

Significant dates
- Added to NRHP: December 15, 1993
- Designated NHL: February 18, 1997

Eleutherian College, founded as Eleutherian Institute in 1848, was a school founded by local anti-slavery Baptists at Lancaster in Jefferson County. The institute's name comes from the Greek word eleutheros, meaning "freedom and equality." The school admitted students without regard to ethnicity or gender, including freed and fugitive slaves. Its first classes began offering secondary school instruction on November 27, 1848. The school was renamed Eleutherian College in 1854, when it began offering college-level coursework. It closed in 1874 and its main building was used for a private normal school and then a public high school. It is now home to a non-profit group. The school was the second college in the United States west of the Allegheny Mountains and the first in Indiana to provide education to students of different colors. The restored three-story stone chapel and classroom building was constructed between 1853 and 1856 and presently serves as a local history museum. The school was listed on the National Register of Historic Places in 1993 and declared a National Historic Landmark in 1997,

In the decade before the American Civil War, African-American students comprised approximately one quarter to one third of the institute's total enrollment, with its peak years between 1855 and 1861. At one time during this period its enrollment reached 150 students; however, attendance soon declined and no black students were enrolled at the school after 1861. During the Civil War the college's grounds were used for military training and its main building were used for meetings and concerts. The college closed in 1874, but the main building was used as a private high school and teachers' training school until 1887, when the Lancaster township trustees purchased the building for use as a public school, which closed in 1938. Historic Madison, a Jefferson County preservation organization, received the school as a gift in 1973 and sold it to its present owners in 1990. The new owners formed Historic Eleutherian College Inc., a non-profit group, in 1996. The main building has been restored to reflect an 1850s-era appearance.

== History ==
Reverend Thomas Craven, a visiting Baptist minister who studied at Miami University in Oxford, Ohio, is credited with proposing the idea for the school. He was also an abolitionist and an early advocate of an integrated educational system. Following his advice, several members of Neil's Creek Abolitionist Baptist Church established the Eleutherian Institute, its initial name, at Lancaster, Indiana, in 1848. Much of the initial organizing done by the extended Hoyt-Whipple family.

From the 1830s to the 1860s the unincorporated community of Lancaster, about 10 miles (16 km) northwest of Madison in Jefferson County, Indiana, was known for its anti-slavery sentiment. Some members of the local community established the Neil's Creek Anti-Slavery Society in 1839 and the Neil's Creek Abolitionist Baptist Church in 1846. Neil's Creek was located about 3 miles (4.8 km) west of Lancaster, a major stop for fugitive slaves along the Underground Railroad route as they traveled north from Madison on the Ohio River to Indianapolis, Indiana. Several abolitionist families in the area, including some members of the school's board of trustees, were active participants in the Underground Railroad. The community's abolitionist church and anti-slavery sentiments also made Lancaster a good place to establish an integrated school.

Eleutherian Institute admitted students without regard to ethnicity or gender, including freed and fugitive slaves. The institute's name comes from the Greek word eleutheros, meaning "freedom and equality". Its first classes began offering secondary school instruction on November 27, 1848, with fifteen students gathering in an old meetinghouse near Lancaster.

Reverend John G. Craven, the son of Reverend Thomas Craven, served as the school's first teacher. John C. Thompson, Thomas Craven's son-in-law, served as a teacher for the first year, but he returned to Ohio when the school was unable to financially support two teachers. Reverend John Craven was principal of the school until 1861, then moved to Minnesota. James and Lucy Nelson maintained the school's dormitory in the days before the American Civil War.

Reverend Thomas Craven donated the land for the school's campus at Lancaster, where two new building were erected atop College Hill in the 1850s, a dormitory, circa 1854, and the stone chapel and classroom building, which was constructed between 1854 and 1856. A log cabin on the property once served as John Craven's home, but no longer exists. In addition to donating land, Reverend Thomas Craven also solicited funds to support the school and recruited students to increase its enrollment.

The institute was renamed Eleutherian College in 1854, when it began offering college-level coursework, making it the second college in the United States west of the Allegheny Mountains (Oberlin College was first) and the first in Indiana to provide interracial education. In the decade prior to the Civil War, African-American students comprised approximately one quarter to one third of its total enrollment, although enrollment of black students was never large. Some of its African-American students came from as far south as New Orleans, Louisiana, and Jackson, Mississippi, but most of them came from Kentucky. The school's peak years were 1855 to 1861. At one time during this period its enrollment reached 150 students. Some sources indicate that by 1860 the college enrolled 200 students, including 50 African Americans, some of whom had come from the Deep South despite fugitive slave laws and an amendment to the state constitution prohibited African-American migration into the state. Overall enrollment declined to 112 students in 1857—58 and dropped to 109 students in 1859, including 18 African-American students, 10 of whom were born into slavery. In 1860, two hundred students were enrolled, 50 of them African-American. No black students were enrolled at the school after 1861.

During the Civil War, some of the school's former students who enlisted in the 6th Indiana Infantry Regiment participated in the military training held on the Eleutherian College's grounds. In addition, the college's buildings were used for meetings and concerts during the war.

After John Craven left the school in 1861, William Brand served as its principal until 1866, followed by several successors. The college closed in 1874; however, John Craven returned to the school in 1878 to help revive it as a private high school and teachers' training school. Craven stayed at the school until 1887. Lancaster township trustees purchased the main classroom and chapel building in 1888 for use as a public school. It finally closed in 1938, after the township schools were consolidated, and the building was eventually abandoned. Subsequent owners were unsuccessful in efforts to have the Indiana Department of Conservation convert the property to a state park.

=== Preservation and restoration ===
Restoration of the college's main building began in the 1960s. Historic Madison, a Jefferson County preservation organization, received the school as a gift in 1973, but sold it in 1990. The new owners formed Historic Eleutherian College Incorporated, a non-profit organization, in 1996. The chapel and classroom building has been restored to "an 1850s-era appearance." Historic Eleutherian College operates the building as a local history museum.

== Description ==
Reverend Thomas Craven donated the land for the school, which eventually included two new buildings erected on the College Hill property in the 1850s. The main building housed a chapel and classrooms; a second building served as a dormitory. Both buildings were constructed of rough-cut limestone from nearby quarries. The two-story dormitory, circa 1854, had fifteen rooms. The three-story main building, completed in 1856, included a chapel and seven more rooms. The main building measures 65 feet (20 m) by 42 feet (13 m). Its classroom spaces were capable of accommodating 200 to 300 students. The dormitory/boardinghouse located near the main school building measures 55 feet (17 m) by 33 feet (10 m).

=== Exterior ===
The main building was constructed between 1854 and 1856 in the Greek Revival style. The three-story building has a rectangular plan that includes a square bell tower (belfry) centered above a gable-fronted main entrance. The gable roof includes a triangular-shaped wood pediment above the third-floor windows. The building's windowsills, lintels, and corner quoins are finished limestone, which contrasts to the rough-hewn stone walls. The north (front) facade of the building has three bays wide with two wooden doors flanking a single, ground-floor window. East and west facades are identical, with four double-height windows below four more on the third level. The south (rear) facade has two windows at the third-floor level.

=== Interior ===
The main building has a small entryway leading to a two-story chapel that runs the length of the building. The chapel includes double-height windows and a balcony, which crosses the north side of the room. The chapel ceiling is covered in wood panels. Stairs at each end of the entry hall lead to the upper floors. The second story includes two classrooms above the entryway and five additional rooms on the third floor. Stairs in one of the third-floor rooms leads to an unfinished attic. A ladder in the attic leads to the belfry tower. The cast bell was manufactured by J.A. Kelley of Franklin Brass Bell Factory, Madison, Indiana.

== Recognition ==
The restored main building (classroom and chapel), now a public museum, was listed on the National Register in 1993 and declared a National Historic Landmark on February 18, 1997. The National Park Service, U.S. Department of the Interior, also lists the building as a Network to Freedom Site. In 2004 the Indiana Historical Bureau installed a state historical marker at the college to honor its role as one of the earliest educational institutions in the state to enroll students of all ethnicities and genders.

== Notable alumni ==
Among the school's most notable African-American students was Moses Broyles, who became pastor of the Second Baptist Church in Indianapolis and an organizer of the Indiana Association of Black Baptists Churches in 1858. Broyles was a slave from Kentucky who purchased his freedom as an adult.

Notable female students included Sarah B. Hoyt, who also studied at Oberlin College. She became a teacher and later served as a high school principal at Newport, Kentucky. Rebecca J. Thompson, who completed studies at the Young Ladies Institute, which later became Shepardson College in Granville, Ohio, was chair of the mathematics department at Franklin College (Indiana) for thirty-eight years. She retired from Franklin College in 1910.

== Gallery ==
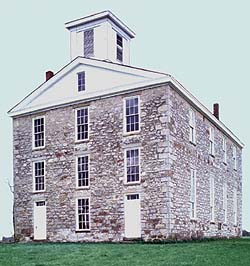
Old NPS picture of the school

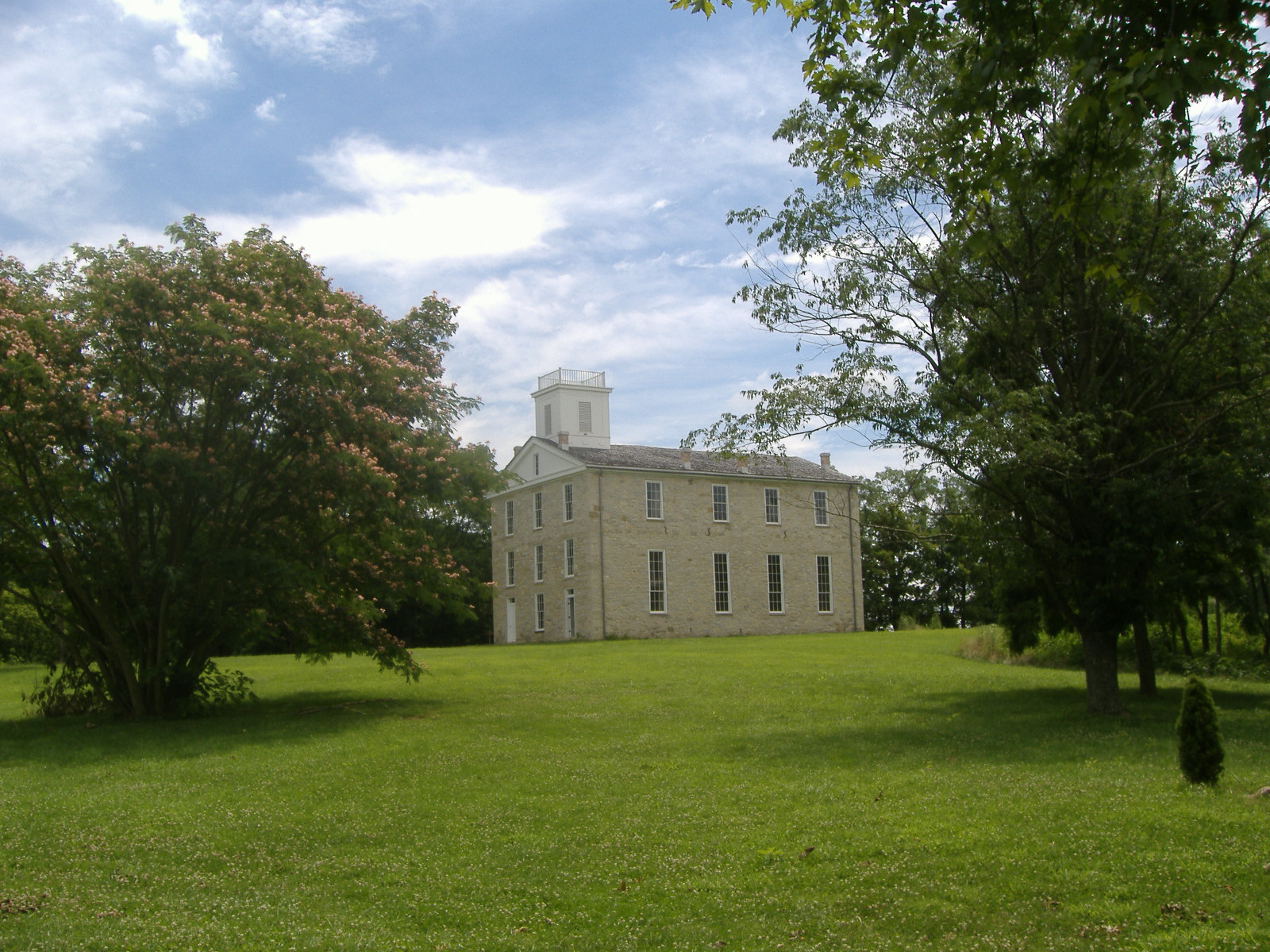
Distant view

== See also ==
- Lyman and Asenath Hoyt House
- List of museums in Indiana
- List of National Historic Landmarks in Indiana
- National Register of Historic Places listings in Jefferson County, Indiana
