= Manville, Indiana =

- Unincorporated community
- Location within Indiana Location within the United States
- Coordinates: 38°47′16″N 85°17′08″W
- Country: United States
- State: Indiana
- County: Jefferson
- Township: Milton
- Elevation: 515 ft (157 m)
- ZIP code: 47250
- FIPS code: 18-46512
- GNIS feature ID: 438539

Manville is an unincorporated community in Milton Township, Jefferson County, Indiana.

== Geography ==
Manville is located on the West Fork of the Indian-Kentuck Creek, just upstream from where it joins the East Prong of the Indian-Kentuck. Manville takes its name from the Manville family, most likely from Nicholas Manville, who was the first postmaster under that name, starting in 1858. However, a post office existed previously under the name Buena Vista, after the site of a Mexican–American War battle, opening in 1847.

As an unincorporated area, Manville has no boundaries. It no longer has either a post office, or any established commerce. Its only institution is the Manville Christian Church, which was founded in 1830. That church grew out of a schism in the former Milton Baptist Church, which was located about two miles north on the East Prong.

== History ==
The first attempt to establish a town was the platting of the town of Vienna in 1813 by Gershom Lee, just downstream from the meeting of the West Fork and East Prong. However, no lots were sold and Lee sold the tract intact in 1817. During this time there was reportedly a Shawnee camp in the area and two Shawnees were reported to stay at Lee's house. A Shawnee woman, Half Moon, married an early settler, John Miller. According to a descendant, George Miller, who wrote extensively in the Madison Courier during the late 1900s, Miller was buried in the wall of the Manville Cemetery. Because he had married a Native American, he reportedly was not buried in the cemetery itself.

The first known commercial reference was made in 1817 when Nicholas Manville petitioned to build a mill and a jury was named to view the impact of a mill dam. While Manville withdrew the request, Manville's mill was soon in operation. Manville either operated it in partnership with a son-in-law Isaac Howard or let Howard operate it.
