= Lyman and Asenath Hoyt House =

Historic house in Indiana, United States

- U.S. National Register of Historic Places
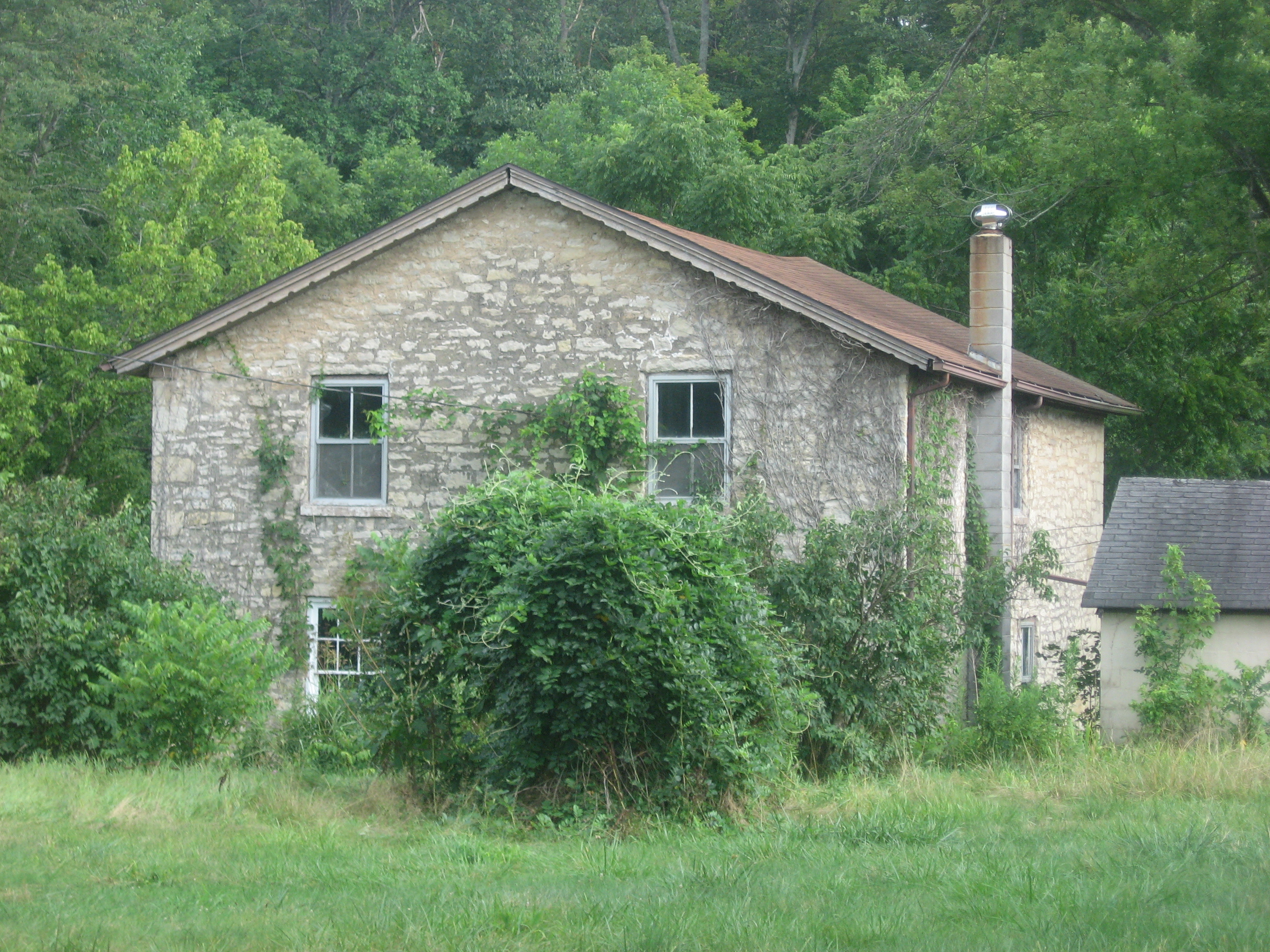
- Lyman and Asenath Hoyt House, July 2012

- Location within Indiana Location within the United States
- Location: 7147 W. State Road 250 at Lancaster Township, Jefferson County, Indiana
- Coordinates: 38°49′56″N 85°31′14″W
- Area: 3 acres (1.2 ha)
- Built: c. 1850
- Architectural style: Greek Revival
- NRHP reference No.: 03000977
- Added to NRHP: September 28, 2003

Lyman and Asenath Hoyt House is a historic home in Lancaster Township, Jefferson County, Indiana that was a stop on the Underground Railroad. It is owned by the non-profit group, Historic Eleutherian College Incorporated. Built about 1850, the two-story, rectangular, limestone dwelling has Greek Revival-style design elements. Its front facade has gable roof and a deep-set wooden entry door.

The house is believed to have been an active stop on the Underground Railroad in Indiana from Madison, Indiana on the Ohio River to Indianapolis, Indiana. Lyman Hoyt, along with other local abolitionists and Reverend Thomas Craven, was also a founder of Eleutherian Institute in 1848. The present-day Hoyt home is private residence and is not open to the public. The Hoyt house was listed on the National Register of Historic Places in 2003.
