= Kent, Jefferson County, Indiana =

Kent, Indiana
- Census-designated place
- Location within Indiana Location within the United States
- Coordinates: 38°44′15″N 85°32′21″W
- Country: United States
- State: Indiana
- County: Jefferson
- Township: Republican

Area
  - Total: 0.069 sq mi (0.18 km^{2})
  - Land: 0.069 sq mi (0.18 km^{2})
  - Water: 0 sq mi (0.00 km^{2})
- Elevation: 719 ft (219 m)

Population (2020)
  - Total: 90
  - Density: 1,327.6/sq mi (512.58/km^{2})
- ZIP code: 47250
- FIPS code: 18-39510
- GNIS feature ID: 2587020

Kent is an unincorporated community and census-designated place (CDP) in Republican Township, Jefferson County, Indiana, United States. As of the 2010 census it had a population of 70.

== History ==
Kent was platted in 1853. It was named for James Kent, a New York jurist. The Kent post office was discontinued in 1965.

== Geography ==
Kent is located in western Jefferson County in the northeast part of Republican Township. Indiana State Road 256 passes through the community, leading east 8 miles (13 km) to Madison, the county seat, and west 14 miles (23 km) to Austin.

According to the U.S. Census Bureau, the Kent CDP has an area of 0.10 square miles (0.27 km^{2}), all of it recorded as land. The community sits on the east side of Little Creek, a north-flowing tributary of Big Creek, a major northwest-flowing tributary of the Muscatatuck River, which is part of the White River watershed.

== Demographics ==
Historical population
Census	Pop.	Note	%±
2020	90		—
U.S. Decennial Census

== Education ==
It is in the Southwestern Jefferson County Consolidated Schools school district. Southwestern High School is the district's comprehensive high school.
