= Brooksburg, Indiana =

- Town
- Town of Brooksburg
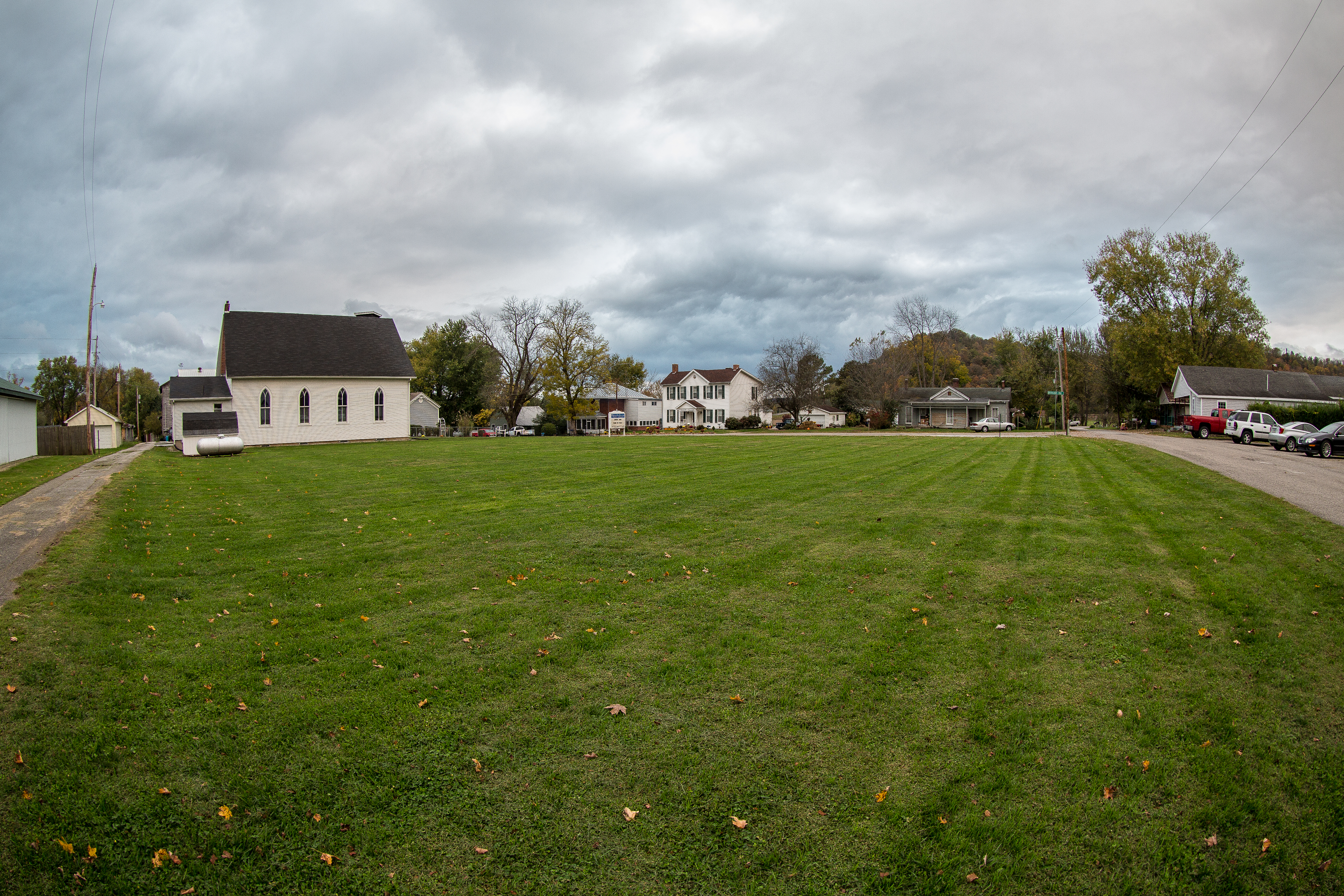

- Location of Brooksburg in Jefferson County, Indiana.
- Coordinates: 38°44′06″N 85°14′40″W
- Country: United States
- State: Indiana
- County: Jefferson
- Township: Milton

Area
  - Total: 0.11 sq mi (0.29 km^{2})
  - Land: 0.10 sq mi (0.26 km^{2})
  - Water: 0.0077 sq mi (0.02 km^{2})
- Elevation: 456 ft (139 m)

Population (2020)
  - Total: 72
  - Density: 708.6/sq mi (273.59/km^{2})
- Time zone: UTC-5 (EST)
  - Summer (DST): UTC-5 (EST)
- ZIP code: 47250
- Area codes: 812 and 930
- FIPS code: 18-08092
- GNIS feature ID: 2396607

Brooksburg is a town in Milton Township, Jefferson County, Indiana, United States. As of the 2020 census, Brooksburg had a population of 72.

== History ==
Brooksburg was platted in 1843. It was named for Noah Brooks, one of its founders. Brooksburg was incorporated as a town on August 24, 1878.

== Geography ==
Brooksburg is located on the south side of the Indian-Kentuck Creek just north of State Road 56 and just before the creek enters the Ohio River.

Brooksburg is home to some classic tobacco barns. Brooksburg also has some buildings dating back to the mid-to-late 19th century. One example is the "Webster" house (named after its original occupants) that was built in the 1870s. This house is now owned by the Fisher family who have resided there for many years and own land in the surrounding area, including four houses in the town itself.

According to the 2010 census, Brooksburg has a total area of 0.11 square miles (0.28 km^{2}), of which 0.1 square miles (0.26 km^{2}) (or 90.91%) is land and 0.01 square miles (0.03 km^{2}) (or 9.09%) is water.

== Demographics ==
Historical population
Census	Pop.	Note	%±
1880	148		—
1890	120		−18.9%
1900	149		24.2%
1910	150		0.7%
1920	117		−22.0%
1930	112		−4.3%
1940	100		−10.7%
1950	132		32.0%
1960	129		−2.3%
1970	104		−19.4%
1980	132		26.9%
1990	79		−40.2%
2000	74		−6.3%
2010	81		9.5%
2020	72		−11.1%
U.S. Decennial Census

=== 2010 census ===
As of the census of 2010, there were 81 people, 32 households, and 19 families residing in the town. The population density was 810.0 inhabitants per square mile (312.7/km^{2}). There were 39 housing units at an average density of 390.0 per square mile (150.6/km^{2}). The racial makeup of the town was 98.8% White and 1.2% African American.

There were 32 households, of which 37.5% had children under the age of 18 living with them, 31.3% were married couples living together, 15.6% had a female householder with no husband present, 12.5% had a male householder with no wife present, and 40.6% were non-families. 25.0% of all households were made up of individuals, and 9.4% had someone living alone who was 65 years of age or older. The average household size was 2.53 and the average family size was 3.00.

The median age in the town was 38.5 years. 27.2% of residents were under the age of 18; 4.9% were between the ages of 18 and 24; 27.1% were from 25 to 44; 28.4% were from 45 to 64; and 12.3% were 65 years of age or older. The gender makeup of the town was 50.6% male and 49.4% female.

=== 2000 census ===
As of the census of 2000, there were 74 people, 31 households, and 23 families residing in the town. The population density was 673.5 inhabitants per square mile (260.0/km^{2}). There were 37 housing units at an average density of 336.8 per square mile (130.0/km^{2}). The racial makeup of the town was 98.65% White, and 1.35% from two or more races.

There were 31 households, out of which 41.9% had children under the age of 18 living with them, 54.8% were married couples living together, 12.9% had a female householder with no husband present, and 25.8% were non-families. 25.8% of all households were made up of individuals, and 9.7% had someone living alone who was 65 years of age or older. The average household size was 2.39 and the average family size was 2.83.

In the town, the population was spread out, with 27.0% under the age of 18, 4.1% from 18 to 24, 32.4% from 25 to 44, 29.7% from 45 to 64, and 6.8% who were 65 years of age or older. The median age was 42 years. For every 100 females, there were 111.4 males. For every 100 females age 18 and over, there were 86.2 males.

The median income for a household in the town was $37,500, and the median income for a family was $41,250. Males had a median income of $37,917 versus $17,250 for females. The per capita income for the town was $19,016. There were no families and 2.5% of the population living below the poverty line, including no under eighteens and 28.6% of those over 64.
