= Madison Consolidated Schools =

School district in Indiana, USA

Madison Consolidated Schools is a school district headquartered in Madison, Indiana.

It includes sections of Jefferson County. In addition to Madison, the district includes Canaan, Deputy, and Dupont. The district includes the townships of Graham, Lancaster, Madison, Milton, Monroe, and Shelby.

== Schools ==
Secondary schools:

- Madison Consolidated High School
- Madison Junior High School (5–8)

Primary schools (PK–4):

- Anderson Elementary School
  - It was closed for a period with the building used for preschool. Circa 2017 the district decided to renovate and expand the building and reopen the elementary school program, so it would have preschool and elementary school.
- Deputy Elementary School
- Lydia Middleton Elementary School
- Rykers' Ridge Elementary School

Former schools

- Canaan Elementary School
  - The first school in Canaan opened in 1872, and the final building opened in 1954. In 2010 the district board of trustees closed Canaan Elementary School. Tom Patterson, the superintendent at the time, stated that the district wanted to save some money. A group of parents wanted to sue the district if it closed the school. A K-8 charter school called Canaan Community Academy opened in the former school in 2012.
- Eggleston Elementary School
  - It closed, and Madison's First Baptist Church bought the building in Summer 2013. It is used as the Eggleston Community Building.
- E.O. Muncie Elementary School
  - It was an elementary school beginning circa 1958. It closed in 2018. Anderson Elementary School was to take most of the students. An alternative high school was in this building beginning in 2019, but in 2022 it moved to MCHS. Circa 2025 the company Schmidt Associates checked if the building could house an early childhood program, and the company concluded that the building was no longer safe for classes.
