= Saluda Township, Jefferson County, Indiana =

Saluda Township
- Township
- Location in Jefferson County
- Coordinates: 38°37′37″N 85°30′09″W
- Country: United States
- State: Indiana
- County: Jefferson

Government
  - Type: Indiana township

Area
  - Total: 37.69 sq mi (97.6 km^{2})
  - Land: 37.35 sq mi (96.7 km^{2})
  - Water: 0.34 sq mi (0.88 km^{2}) 0.90%
- Elevation: 774 ft (236 m)

Population (2020)
  - Total: 1,333
  - Density: 35.69/sq mi (13.78/km^{2})
- GNIS feature ID: 0453830

Saluda Township is one of ten townships in Jefferson County, Indiana, United States. As of the 2020 census, its population was 1,333 and it contained 589 housing units. It was created by the Jefferson County Court of Common Pleas on Feb. 13, 1817. Saluda is derived from a Native American name meaning "river of corn".

Historical population
Census	Pop.	Note	%±
1890	1,482		—
1900	1,488		0.4%
1910	1,479		−0.6%
1920	1,288		−12.9%
1930	1,042		−19.1%
1940	1,110		6.5%
1950	1,186		6.8%
1960	1,237		4.3%
1970	1,236		−0.1%
1980	1,358		9.9%
1990	1,305		−3.9%
2000	1,358		4.1%
2010	1,370		0.9%
2020	1,333		−2.7%
Source: US Decennial Census

== Geography ==
According to the 2010 census, the township has a total area of 37.69 square miles (97.6 km^{2}), of which 37.35 square miles (96.7 km^{2}) (or 99.10%) is land and 0.34 square miles (0.88 km^{2}) (or 0.90%) is water. The streams of Big Saluda Creek, Farley Creek, Harts Falls Creek and Lee Creek run through this township.

=== Unincorporated towns ===
- Chelsea
- Paynesville
- Saluda

=== Adjacent townships ===
- Hanover Township (north)
- Bethlehem Township, Clark County (southeast)
- Washington Township, Clark County (southwest)
- Lexington Township, Scott County (west)
- Republican Township (northwest)

=== Cemeteries ===
The township contains the following cemeteries: Barnes, Harrell (also called Fairview), Maddox, Marble Hill (also called Bowman), Marling, Mt. Zion, New Bethel Methodist Church, New Prospect, Swan

=== Major highways ===
- Indiana State Road 62
- Indiana State Road 356

== Education ==
The school district is Southwestern Jefferson County Consolidated Schools. The comprehensive high school is Southwestern High School.
