= Deputy, Indiana =

Deputy
- Census-designated place
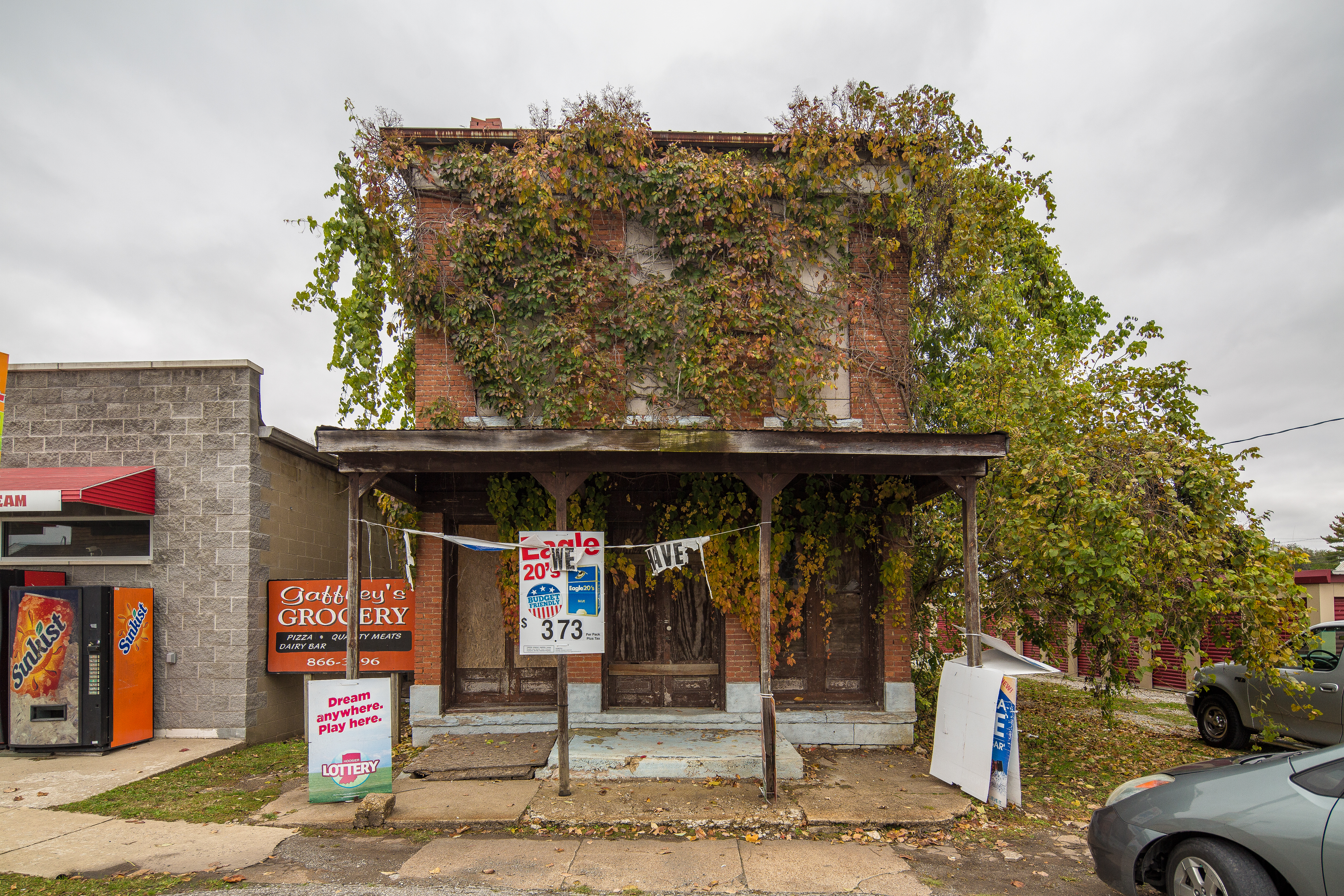

- Location of Deputy, Jefferson County, Indiana

- Location within Indiana Location within the United States
- Coordinates: 38°47′42″N 85°39′10″W
- Country: United States
- State: Indiana
- County: Jefferson
- Township: Graham

Area
  - Total: 0.073 sq mi (0.19 km^{2})
  - Land: 0.073 sq mi (0.19 km^{2})
  - Water: 0 sq mi (0.00 km^{2})
- Elevation: 637 ft (194 m)

Population (2020)
  - Total: 86
  - Density: 1,166.1/sq mi (450.25/km^{2})
- ZIP code: 47230
- FIPS code: 18-17812
- GNIS feature ID: 2587016

Deputy is an unincorporated community and census-designated place (CDP) in Graham Township, Jefferson County, Indiana, United States. By road it is approximately 18 miles (29 km) northwest of Madison, the county seat. As of the 2020 census, Deputy had a population of 86.

== Geography ==
Deputy is located in western Jefferson County northwest of the center of Graham Township. Indiana State Road 3 forms the eastern edge of the community; the highway leads north 16 miles (26 km) to North Vernon and south 40 miles (64 km) to Jeffersonville.

According to the U.S. Census Bureau, the Deputy CDP has an area of 0.073 square miles (0.19 km^{2}), all of it recorded as land. Lewis Creek flows northward just east of the community, leading in 1 mile (1.6 km) to the Muscatatuck River, part of the White River watershed.

Deputy is located on land that is considered to be of karst topography. The town and the area around it contain numerous sink holes and caves.

=== Climate ===
The climate in this area is characterized by hot, humid summers and generally mild to cool winters. According to the Köppen Climate Classification system, Deputy has a humid subtropical climate, abbreviated "Cfa" on climate maps.

== Description ==
Primarily an agricultural community, Deputy residents farm timber, corn, soybeans, wheat, hay, tobacco as well as vegetables and fruits in season. Cattle, hogs, chickens, goats, sheep, horses and donkeys are typical of farm animals many residents raise in the Deputy area.

There is no other town or community in the United States named Deputy.

== History ==
Deputy was laid out as a town in March 1871 by Foster C. Wilson, the husband of Margaret Mary Deputy and son-in-law of John and Harriet Deputy.

Local lore - and probably the source of the town's name - indicates that the area was first settled in the 1810s by a number of Deputy families that had migrated to Clark County, Indiana, from Sussex County, Delaware, probably as a result of the conclusion of the Treaty of Fort Wayne in September 1809 which opened up lands in the Indiana territory to American settlement.

Deputy Pike is the historic road which connects Deputy to the county seat, Madison. It begins as Main Street and then heads east for 13 miles (21 km), becoming Deputy Pike at State Highway 3 and West Deputy Pike Road at North Home Road. It eventually merges with State Highway 7, which runs southeast to Madison. Deputy Pike is a scenic route along the Muskatatuck River ("Big Creek" as it is known locally) along the road's western and central portions and along Harbert's Creek to the east. It runs by several cemeteries such as Robertson Cemetery and through the smaller communities of Wakefield and Volga. It was originally a toll road but has long since been publicly maintained by the county.

== Methodist Episcopal Camp Meetings ==
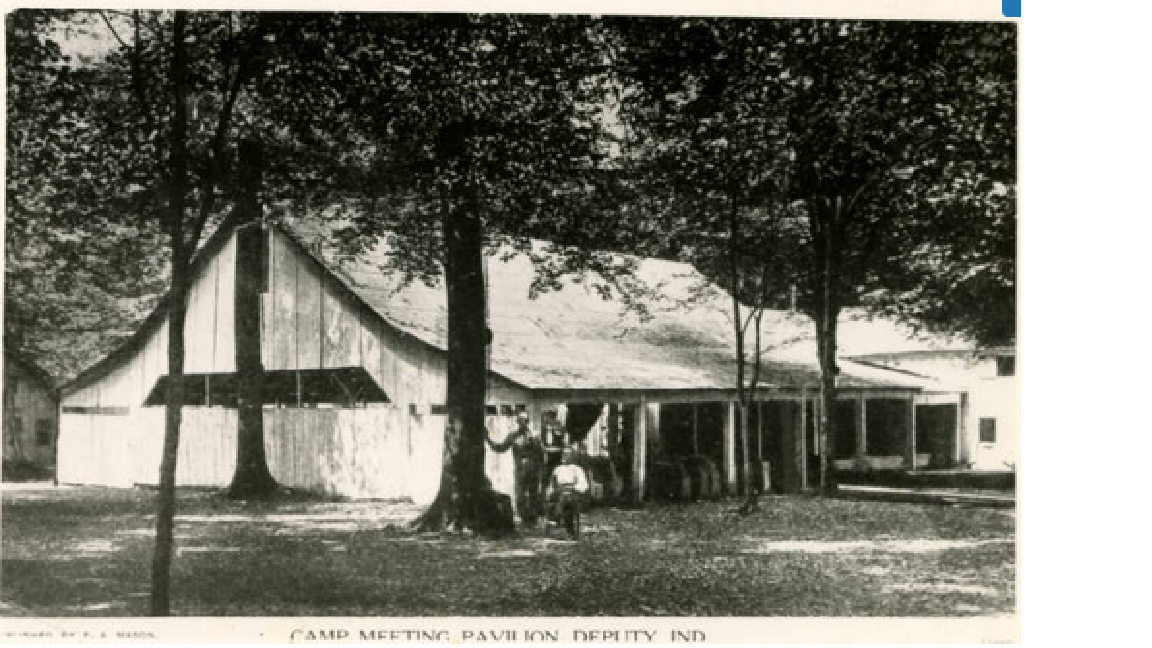
A photo of the Deputy Camp Meeting Pavilion near Deputy, Indiana, circa 1900

Some notable churches in the area are the Deputy United Methodist Church, the Pisgah Methodist Church, the Open Door Baptist Church, the Bethany Baptist Church and the Lick Branch Baptist Church. Deputy is the area where the historic Deputy Camp Meetings were held by the Methodist Episcopal Church as part of the Second Great Awakening movement in the mid-1800s. These camp meetings - which initially featured "round the clock" evangelism and passionate "fire and brimstone" preaching to win new converts - were central features of the outreach of the Methodist church in the American frontiers. The Deputy Camp Meetings (first billed as "Beech Glen Camp Meeting") were the first such meetings held in Indiana in the late 1840s. They became part of the network of camp meetings organized under the Indiana Conference of the Methodist Episcopal Church. (See below historical photo) The camp meetings continued in the Deputy area until the start of World War I, gradually evolving into permanent congregations who built their own church buildings. Pisgah Methodist Church is the location of the Pisgah cemetery, which holds many graves from the Revolutionary era and Civil War era to the present.

== Demographics ==
Historical population
Census	Pop.	Note	%±
2020	86		—
U.S. Decennial Census

== Education ==
It is in the Madison Consolidated Schools school district. Located in Deputy is the Deputy Elementary School, part of the Madison Consolidated Schools system. As of 2020, the principal is Janet McCreary. Deputy Elementary School is located near the site of the old Deputy High School. The Deputy Elementary School and the old Deputy High School mascot is a panther.

The original "Old Brick School" was erected in 1897 and covered all grades. The school was later Enlarged and renovated in 1907.

The zoned MCS elementary school for Deputy is Deputy Elementary School. The zoned secondary schools of the Madison district are Madison Junior High School and Madison Consolidated High School.
