= Middlefork, Jefferson County, Indiana =

- Unincorporated community
- Location within Indiana Location within the United States
- Coordinates: 38°51′14″N 85°28′20″W
- Country: United States
- State: Indiana
- County: Jefferson
- Township: Lancaster
- Elevation: 774 ft (236 m)
- ZIP code: 47231
- FIPS code: 18-48978
- GNIS feature ID: 439115

Middlefork is an unincorporated community in Lancaster Township, Jefferson County, Indiana.

The community took its name from the Middle Fork Creek.
