= Indiana State Road 250 =

Highway in Indiana

State Road 250
- SR 250 highlighted in red

Route information
- Maintained by INDOT
- Length: 68.565 mi (110.345 km)

Western segment
- Length: 33.433 mi (53.805 km)
- West end: US 50 in Brownstown
- Major intersections: US 31 in Uniontown; I-65 in Uniontown
- East end: SR 7 in Middlefork

Eastern segment
- Length: 35.132 mi (56.539 km)
- West end: US 421 in Belleview
- East end: SR 156 in Patriot

Location
- Country: United States
- State: Indiana
- Counties: Jackson, Jefferson, Jennings, Switzerland

Highway system
- Indiana State Highway System; Interstate; US; State; Scenic
← SR 249	→ SR 252

State Road 250 (SR 250) in the U.S. state of Indiana is a secondary route that runs from U.S. Route 50 (US 50) in Brownstown eastward toward the Ohio River at State Road 156 (SR 156) in Patriot in southeast Indiana. Towns include Uniontown, Paris Crossing, Canaan, and East Enterprise. SR 250 is split in two north of Madison due to the Big Oaks National Wildlife Refuge (formerly the Jefferson Proving Ground).

== Route description ==
Most of the length of SR 250 is a rural two-lane highway.

=== Western section ===
SR 250 heads southeast from the western terminus in Brownstown towards State Road 39. At the intersection with SR 39, SR 250 turns east. Then SR 250 passes through an intersection with the southern terminus of the northern section of State Road 11 (SR 11). SR 250 then passes through an intersection with U.S. Route 31 (US 31) and an interchange with Interstate 65 (I-65). SR 250 heads east from I-65 and then has a concurrency with State Road 3. Then SR 250 heads east from the concurrency with SR 3 towards the eastern terminus of the western section. Then eastern terminus of this section is an intersection with State Road 7.

=== Eastern section ===
The eastern section begins at an intersection with U.S. Route 421. SR 250 has a concurrency with State Road 62. Then SR 250 leaves the concurrency with SR 62 and then passes through intersections with State Road 129 and State Road 56. SR 250 then has an intersection with SR 156, this intersection is the eastern terminus of SR 250.

== History ==
SR 250 has a western section that went from US 50 toward State Road 37 in Mitchell.

== Major intersections ==
County	Location	mi	km	Destinations	Notes
Jackson	Brownstown	0.000	0.000	US 50 – Bedford, Seymour	Western terminus of western section of SR 250
Jackson	Wegan	2.496	4.017	SR 39 south – Little York	Northern terminus of the southern section of SR 39
Jackson	Washington Township	8.485	13.655	SR 11 north – Seymour	Southern terminus of SR 11
Jackson	Uniontown	13.105	21.090	US 31 – Scottsburg, Columbus	
Jackson	Uniontown	13.431– 13.601	21.615– 21.889	I-65 – Indianapolis, Louisville	Exit 41 on I-65
Jennings	Paris Crossing	23.663	38.082	SR 3 north – Vernon	Northern end of SR 3 concurrence
Jennings	Paris Crossing	23.908	38.476	SR 3 south – Charlestown	Southern end of SR 3
Jefferson	Middlefork	33.433	53.805	SR 7 – Madison, Vernon	Eastern terminus of the western section of SR 250
Gap in route
Jefferson	Belleview	33.434	53.807	US 421 – Madison, Versailles	Western terminus of the eastern section of SR 250
Jefferson	Belleview	35.541	57.198	SR 62 west – Madison	Western end of SR 62 concurrence
Jefferson	Canaan	42.764	68.822	SR 62 east – Dillsboro	Eastern end of SR 62 concurrence
Switzerland	Pleasant Township	46.663	75.097	SR 129	
Switzerland	East Enterprise	57.610	92.714	SR 56 – Vevay, Rising Sun	
Switzerland	Patriot	68.565	110.345	SR 156 – Florence, Rising Sun	Eastern terminus of SR 250
1.000 mi = 1.609 km; 1.000 km = 0.621 mi: Concurrency terminus
