= Madison Consolidated High School =

Location
- 743 Clifty Drive; Madison, Jefferson County, Indiana 47250; United States; 38.773491°N 85.401831°W

Information
- Type: Public high school
- School district: Madison Consolidated Schools
- Principal: Ronnie Lawhead
- Teaching staff: 51.83 (FTE)
- Grades: 9–12
- Enrollment: 761 (2023-2024)
- Student to teacher ratio: 14.68
- Colors: Red and white
- Athletics: Football, Basketball, Baseball, Wrestling, Volleyball, Cheerleading, Soccer, Softball, Track, Cross Country, Golf, Marching Band, Color Guard
- Athletics conference: Hoosier Hills Conference (1972-2021) Independent (2021-2026) Mid-Southern Conference (2026+)
- Mascot: Cub
- Rival: Southwestern High School
- Website: madison.k12.in.us/mchs-home

Madison Consolidated High School is a school in Madison, Indiana, United States. It is a part of the Madison Consolidated Schools. The school was first constructed in 1960 with multiple expansions starting in 1969. Since the school's original construction, a library, gymnasium, cafeteria, and fine arts academy have been either added or renovated along with two entire school wings for extra capacity. MCHS is home to the Conner K. Salm Gymnasium, the Opal E. Sherman Auditorium, and a large athletic facility.

The district includes Madison, Canaan, Deputy, and Dupont.

The alternative school moved from the former E.O. Muncie Elementary School to the MCHS second floor in 2022.

== See also ==
- List of high schools in Indiana
