= Jefferson County, Indiana =

County in Indiana, United States

- County
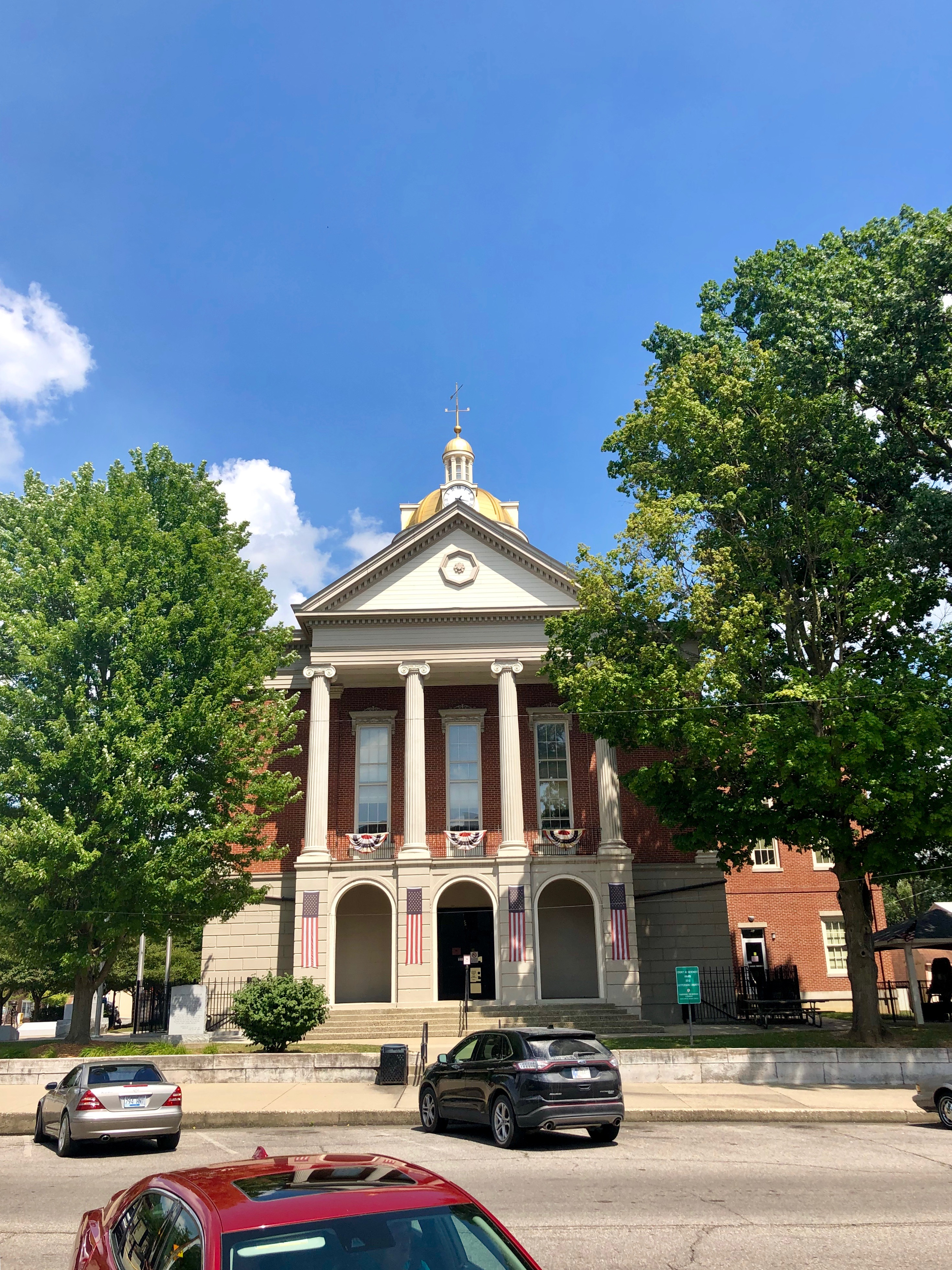
- Jefferson County Courthouse in Madison

- Location within the U.S. state of Indiana
- Coordinates: 38°47′N 85°26′W
- Country: United States
- State: Indiana
- Founded: 1811
- Named for: Thomas Jefferson
- Seat: Madison
- Largest city: Madison

Area
  - Total: 362.89 sq mi (939.9 km^{2})
  - Land: 360.63 sq mi (934.0 km^{2})
  - Water: 2.26 sq mi (5.9 km^{2}) 0.62%

Population (2020)
  - Total: 33,147
  - Estimate (2025): 33,279 ▲
  - Density: 91.914/sq mi (35.488/km^{2})
- Time zone: UTC−5 (Eastern)
  - Summer (DST): UTC−4 (EDT)
- Congressional district: 6th
- Website: jeffersoncounty.in.gov/index.php
- Indiana county number 39

Jefferson County is a county located in the U.S. state of Indiana. As of 2020, the population was 33,147. The county seat is Madison.

== History ==
Jefferson County was formed on February 1, 1811, from Dearborn and Clark Counties. It was named for Thomas Jefferson, principal draftsman of the Northwest Ordinance and President of the United States from 1801 through 1809.

Jefferson County was one of Indiana's first counties, and many important early Hoosiers came from Madison, including William Hendricks. Throughout the early history of the state, Madison was one of the leading cities competing with Vincennes, and later New Albany, to be the largest city in the state. The county fell into economic decline after the American Civil War, as industry began to shift from southern Indiana to the northern part of the state.

On the evening of May 20, 2009, the county courthouse caught fire. The fire began in the steeple of the courthouse, which was under reconstruction for Madison's bicentenary. The roof of the dome had just been painted gold. Fire departments from across southern Indiana and northern Kentucky arrived to put out the fire, which burned for several hours, destroyed much of the inside of the building and the county records. The fire forced the evacuation of the nearby county jail, and effectively shut down the downtown area of the city. It was later determined the fire was accidentally started by workers who were welding on the metal roof dome.

The tallest waterfall in Indiana, Fremont Falls, is located in Hanover.

== Geography ==
According to the 2010 census, the county has a total area of 362.89 square miles (939.9 km^{2}), of which 360.63 square miles (934.0 km^{2}) (or 99.38%) is land and 2.26 square miles (5.9 km^{2}) (or 0.62%) is water. Jefferson County makes up the Madison, IN Micropolitan Statistical Area.

=== Cities and towns ===
- Brooksburg
- Dupont
- Hanover
- Madison (county seat)

=== Census-designated places ===
- Canaan
- Deputy
- Kent

=== Townships ===
- Graham
- Hanover
- Lancaster
- Madison
- Milton
- Monroe
- Republican
- Saluda
- Shelby
- Smyrna

=== Adjacent counties ===
- Ripley County (north)
- Switzerland County (east)
- Carroll County, Kentucky (southeast)
- Trimble County, Kentucky (south)
- Clark County (southwest)
- Scott County (west)
- Jennings County (northwest)

=== Major highways ===
Sources: National Atlas, U.S. Census Bureau

- U.S. Route 421
- Indiana State Road 3
- Indiana State Road 7
- Indiana State Road 56
- Indiana State Road 62
- Indiana State Road 250
- Indiana State Road 256
- Indiana State Road 356
- Indiana State Road 362

=== National protected area ===
- Big Oaks National Wildlife Refuge (part)

== Climate and weather ==
Madison, Indiana

Climate chart (precipitation, max. and min. temperature)
J	F	M	A	M	J	J	A	S	O	N	D
3.1 39 23	3 44 26	4.3 55 34	4.3 65 43	5 75 53	4.4 83 62	4.4 87 66	4.1 85 65	2.9 79 57	3.2 67 45	3.8 55 36	3.7 44 27
- █ Average max. and min. temperatures in °F
- █ Precipitation totals in inches
- Source: The Weather Channel
Metric conversion
J	F	M	A	M	J	J	A	S	O	N	D
80 4 −5	75 7 −3	108 13 1	109 18 6	126 24 12	111 28 17	112 31 19	104 29 18	74 26 14	81 19 7	98 13 2	94 7 −3
- █ Average max. and min. temperatures in °C
- █ Precipitation totals in mm

In recent years, average temperatures in Madison have ranged from a low of 23 °F (−5 °C) in January to a high of 87 °F (31 °C) in July, although a record low of −18 °F (−28 °C) was recorded in December 1989 and a record high of 108 °F (42 °C) was recorded in July 1954. Average monthly precipitation ranged from 2.92 inches (74 mm) in September to 4.96 inches (126 mm) in May.

== Government ==
The county government is a constitutional body, and is granted specific powers by the Constitution of Indiana, and by the Indiana Code.

County Council: The county council is the legislative branch of the county government and controls all the spending and revenue collection in the county. Representatives are elected from county districts. The council members serve four-year terms. They are responsible for setting salaries, the annual budget, and special spending. The council also has limited authority to impose local taxes, in the form of an income and property tax that is subject to state level approval, excise taxes, and service taxes.

Board of Commissioners: The executive body of the county is made of a board of commissioners. The commissioners are elected county-wide, in staggered terms, and each serves a four-year term. One of the commissioners, typically the most senior, serves as president. The commissioners are charged with executing the acts legislated by the council, collecting revenue, and managing the day-to-day functions of the county government.

Court: The county maintains a small claims court that can handle some civil cases. The judge on the court is elected to a term of four years and must be a member of the Indiana Bar Association. The judge is assisted by a constable, who is also elected to a four-year term. In some cases, court decisions can be appealed to the state level circuit court.

County Officials: The county has several other elected offices, including sheriff, coroner, auditor, treasurer, recorder, surveyor, and circuit court clerk Each of these elected officers serves a term of four years and oversees a different part of county government. Members elected to county government positions are required to declare party affiliations and to be residents of the county.

Jefferson County is part of Indiana's 6th congressional district and is represented in Congress by Republican Luke Messer. It is also part of Indiana Senate district 45 and is split between Indiana House of Representatives districts 66, 67 and 69.

=== Politics ===
United States presidential election results for Jefferson County, Indiana
Year	Republican		Democratic		Third party(ies)	
Year	No.	%	No.	%	No.	%
1888	3,321	54.87%	2,700	44.61%	31	0.51%
1892	3,135	53.44%	2,549	43.45%	182	3.10%
1896	3,636	57.30%	2,645	41.69%	64	1.01%
1900	3,371	55.12%	2,636	43.10%	109	1.78%
1904	3,195	53.20%	2,542	42.32%	269	4.48%
1908	2,995	50.06%	2,708	45.26%	280	4.68%
1912	1,563	30.46%	2,325	45.31%	1,243	24.23%
1916	2,675	49.76%	2,518	46.84%	183	3.40%
1920	5,732	58.02%	4,000	40.49%	148	1.50%
1924	5,192	55.50%	3,914	41.84%	249	2.66%
1928	5,295	57.24%	3,906	42.22%	50	0.54%
1932	4,670	45.95%	5,305	52.19%	189	1.86%
1936	5,320	52.12%	4,805	47.08%	82	0.80%
1940	5,957	55.80%	4,688	43.91%	31	0.29%
1944	5,748	56.17%	4,376	42.76%	110	1.07%
1948	5,166	53.79%	4,302	44.79%	136	1.42%
1952	6,169	58.90%	4,251	40.59%	53	0.51%
1956	6,632	60.27%	4,344	39.48%	28	0.25%
1960	6,333	55.11%	5,119	44.54%	40	0.35%
1964	4,808	41.50%	6,694	57.78%	84	0.73%
1968	5,731	49.31%	4,635	39.88%	1,257	10.81%
1972	6,722	60.54%	4,267	38.43%	114	1.03%
1976	5,573	46.94%	6,139	51.71%	161	1.36%
1980	6,831	52.20%	5,496	42.00%	760	5.81%
1984	7,482	59.20%	4,952	39.18%	205	1.62%
1988	6,949	56.64%	5,221	42.56%	98	0.80%
1992	4,937	37.43%	5,510	41.77%	2,744	20.80%
1996	4,827	40.96%	5,441	46.17%	1,517	12.87%
2000	6,582	55.17%	5,117	42.89%	232	1.94%
2004	7,763	59.85%	5,117	39.45%	91	0.70%
2008	7,053	52.21%	6,255	46.30%	202	1.50%
2012	7,096	53.94%	5,728	43.54%	332	2.52%
2016	8,546	62.59%	4,326	31.69%	781	5.72%
2020	9,663	65.60%	4,731	32.12%	336	2.28%
2024	9,614	66.97%	4,442	30.94%	299	2.08%

== Demographics ==
Historical population
Census	Pop.	Note	%±
1820	8,038		—
1830	11,465		42.6%
1840	16,614		44.9%
1850	23,916		44.0%
1860	25,036		4.7%
1870	29,741		18.8%
1880	25,977		−12.7%
1890	24,507		−5.7%
1900	22,913		−6.5%
1910	20,483		−10.6%
1920	20,709		1.1%
1930	19,182		−7.4%
1940	19,912		3.8%
1950	21,613		8.5%
1960	24,061		11.3%
1970	27,006		12.2%
1980	30,419		12.6%
1990	29,797		−2.0%
2000	31,705		6.4%
2010	32,428		2.3%
2020	33,147		2.2%
2025 (est.)	33,279	▲	0.4%
U.S. Decennial Census; 1790-1960 1900-1990; 1990-2000 2010-2013

=== Racial and ethnic composition ===
Jefferson County, Indiana – Racial and ethnic composition Note: the US Census treats Hispanic/Latino as an ethnic category. This table excludes Latinos from the racial categories and assigns them to a separate category. Hispanics/Latinos may be of any race.
Race / Ethnicity (NH = Non-Hispanic)	Pop 1980	Pop 1990	Pop 2000	Pop 2010	Pop 2020	% 1980	% 1990	% 2000	% 2010	% 2020
White alone (NH)	29,733	29,107	30,321	30,463	30,023	97.74%	97.68%	95.63%	93.94%	90.58%
Black or African American alone (NH)	389	358	453	530	510	1.28%	1.20%	1.43%	1.63%	1.54%
Native American or Alaska Native alone (NH)	37	55	71	59	79	0.12%	0.18%	0.22%	0.18%	0.24%
Asian alone (NH)	85	118	186	211	290	0.28%	0.40%	0.59%	0.65%	0.87%
Native Hawaiian or Pacific Islander alone (NH)	x	x	4	5	10	x	x	0.01%	0.02%	0.03%
Other race alone (NH)	41	36	18	29	106	0.13%	0.12%	0.06%	0.09%	0.32%
Mixed race or Multiracial (NH)	x	x	320	376	1,018	x	x	1.01%	1.16%	3.07%
Hispanic or Latino (any race)	134	123	332	755	1,111	0.44%	0.41%	1.05%	2.33%	3.35%
Total	30,419	29,797	31,705	32,428	33,147	100.00%	100.00%	100.00%	100.00%	100.00%

=== 2020 census ===
As of the 2020 census, the county had a population of 33,147. The median age was 40.6 years. 21.1% of residents were under the age of 18 and 18.6% of residents were 65 years of age or older. For every 100 females there were 92.5 males, and for every 100 females age 18 and over there were 89.4 males age 18 and over.

The racial makeup of the county was 91.5% White, 1.6% Black or African American, 0.3% American Indian and Alaska Native, 0.9% Asian, <0.1% Native Hawaiian and Pacific Islander, 1.8% from some other race, and 3.9% from two or more races. Hispanic or Latino residents of any race comprised 3.4% of the population.

52.6% of residents lived in urban areas, while 47.4% lived in rural areas.

There were 12,992 households in the county, of which 28.6% had children under the age of 18 living in them. Of all households, 46.6% were married-couple households, 18.8% were households with a male householder and no spouse or partner present, and 26.2% were households with a female householder and no spouse or partner present. About 29.4% of all households were made up of individuals and 13.2% had someone living alone who was 65 years of age or older.

There were 14,386 housing units, of which 9.7% were vacant. Among occupied housing units, 72.3% were owner-occupied and 27.7% were renter-occupied. The homeowner vacancy rate was 1.6% and the rental vacancy rate was 6.4%.

=== 2010 census ===
As of the 2010 United States census, there were 32,428 people, 12,635 households, and 8,456 families residing in the county. The population density was 89.9 inhabitants per square mile (34.7/km^{2}). There were 14,311 housing units at an average density of 39.7 per square mile (15.3/km^{2}). The racial makeup of the county was 95.2% white, 1.7% black or African American, 0.7% Asian, 0.2% American Indian, 0.9% from other races, and 1.3% from two or more races. Those of Hispanic or Latino origin made up 2.3% of the population. In terms of ancestry, 23.5% were German, 15.4% were American, 12.9% were Irish, and 11.2% were English.

Of the 12,635 households, 31.4% had children under the age of 18 living with them, 50.5% were married couples living together, 11.4% had a female householder with no husband present, 33.1% were non-families, and 27.2% of all households were made up of individuals. The average household size was 2.42 and the average family size was 2.90. The median age was 39.7 years.

The median income for a household in the county was $47,697 and the median income for a family was $52,343. Males had a median income of $42,629 versus $30,475 for females. The per capita income for the county was $21,278. About 10.2% of families and 15.1% of the population were below the poverty line, including 22.1% of those under age 18 and 10.1% of those age 65 or over.

== Education ==
There are two school districts with sections of the county: Madison Consolidated Schools and Southwestern Jefferson County Consolidated Schools.

All Jefferson County residents five years and older are eligible to obtain a free library card from the Jefferson County Public Library in Madison.

== See also ==
- National Register of Historic Places listings in Jefferson County, Indiana
