= Elbridge Blish Thompson =

American businessman who died in the sinking of the RMS Lusitania (1882–1915)

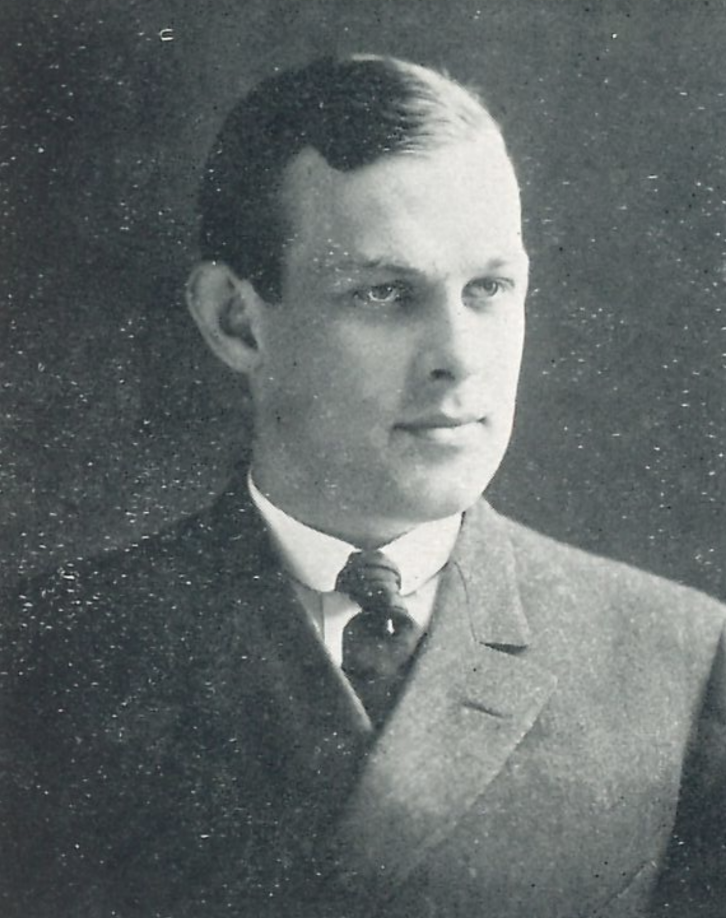
- Thompson, Yale University, 1904
- Born: August 2, 1882; Seymour, Indiana, U.S.
- Died: May 7, 1915 (aged 32); At sea, off the Old Head of Kinsale, Ireland (sinking of the RMS Lusitania)
- Body discovered: Never recovered
- Resting place: Cenotaph at Riverview Cemetery, Seymour, Indiana
- Education: Lake Forest Academy; Phillips Academy; Sheffield Scientific School, Yale University (1904)
- Occupations: Flour miller, businessman
- Known for: Secretary and sales manager of the Blish Milling Company; victim of the Lusitania sinking
- Spouse: Maude Robinson (m. 1904)
- Parent(s): Elbridge Gerry Thompson; Emma Blish

Elbridge Blish Thompson (August 2, 1882 – May 7, 1915) was an American flour miller and businessman from Seymour, Indiana. The secretary and sales manager of the Blish Milling Company and a director of the Seymour Water Company, he died in the sinking of the RMS Lusitania after giving his lifebelt to a fellow passenger. His wife Maude survived the sinking; her subsequent claim against Germany before the United States–Germany Mixed Claims Commission was dismissed on nationality grounds and became a noted decision in international claims law.

== Early life and education ==
Thompson was born in Seymour, Indiana, on August 2, 1882, to Elbridge Gerry Thompson and Emma Blish. His mother belonged to the Blish family of Seymour, whose flour milling firm was among the city's principal businesses; the company had been founded by John Blish, a son-in-law of Seymour's founder Meedy Shields. Thompson's father held railroad management positions in Houston, Texas, and St. Louis, Missouri, and died in 1889, after which Emma returned with her son to Seymour.

Thompson prepared at Lake Forest Academy in Illinois and at Phillips Academy in Andover, Massachusetts, before attending Yale University, where he took the metallurgy course at the Sheffield Scientific School, joined the Delta Phi fraternity, and served as president of the university's Indiana state club, graduating in 1904. He married Maude Robinson, daughter of Frank A. and Ella (West) Robinson, in New York City on March 31, 1904.

== Career ==
After graduation, Thompson spent a year as a metallurgist at a mine in Breckenridge, Colorado. At the urging of his Blish uncles, he returned to Seymour in 1905 and entered the family flour milling business, becoming secretary of the Blish Milling Company and, from 1910, taking complete charge of its sales department. During his tenure the company was engaged in the freight-damage litigation that culminated, a year after his death, in the United States Supreme Court decision Georgia, Florida, & Alabama Railway Co. v. Blish Milling Co. (1916), a leading case on notice-of-claim provisions under the Carmack Amendment.

Thompson was also a director of the Seymour Water Company and served as his township's Republican chairman. He belonged to the First Presbyterian Church of Seymour, the Indiana University Club, the Seymour Country Club, and the Masonic fraternity. In 1914, he decorated his Indianapolis-built National roadster as a German U-boat for a parade in Seymour, an episode Indiana newspapers recalled as an eerie coincidence after his death.

== Sinking of the Lusitania ==
In May 1915, Thompson and his wife booked passage on the Lusitania. The trip was planned in the interest of the milling business — Thompson was to confer with the firm's London agent regarding a large flour contract sought by a company in the Netherlands and to widen its contacts among European buyers — combined with a three-month tour of England, Scotland, and Ireland. They upgraded from cabin A-21 to suite B-68, adjoining the suite occupied by Elbert Hubbard and his wife Alice.

The Thompsons were in the first-class dining saloon when the ship was torpedoed by the German submarine SM U-20 on May 7, 1915. Thompson retrieved lifebelts from their cabin, and on the boat deck gave his own to fellow passenger Charlotte Luck, who was traveling with her two young sons; none of the Luck family survived. As the ship made its final plunge, the couple were swept into the water and separated by the suction of the sinking liner. Maude was pulled onto a collapsible raft and rescued by a trawler that landed survivors at Queenstown; Thompson was lost, and his body, if recovered, was never identified. Maude's cable home, reading "Maudie safe", was mistranscribed in transmission in a way that briefly gave his family false hope of his survival.

Thompson was one of four Yale alumni who died in the sinking, along with Alfred Gwynne Vanderbilt, Lindon Bates Jr., and Justus Miles Forman.

== Memorial and legacy ==
A memorial service was held on June 18, 1915, at the First Presbyterian Church in Seymour, attended by Blish Milling employees and Thompson's Yale classmates, and a monument was erected over an empty grave at Riverview Cemetery in Seymour. His widow endowed an annual scholarship at the Sheffield Scientific School reserved for graduates of Shields High School in Seymour.

Maude Thompson filed a claim against Germany with the State Department in August 1915. She returned to Europe during the war, donating Thompson's two National automobiles to the French war effort, and served with the Red Cross in France, where in November 1917 she married the French aviator Count Jean de Gennes. Because her remarriage to a foreign national terminated her American citizenship under the law then in force, the United States–Germany Mixed Claims Commission dismissed her claim in March 1925, holding in Maud Thompson de Gennes (United States) v. Germany that the claim was not impressed with American nationality when the Treaty of Berlin took effect. The decision by umpire Edwin B. Parker became a frequently cited authority on the nationality of claims in international law.

The couple had no children. Maude, who as Countess de Gennes lived at the Château de Longue Plaine in the Loire Valley and remained in France through the German occupation, died in Queens, New York, on May 17, 1951.
