= Hodapp =

Hodapp is a surname. Notable people with the surname include:

- Christopher L. Hodapp (born 1958), American author and filmmaker
- Johnny Hodapp (1905–1980), American professional baseball player
- Leroy Charles Hodapp (1923–2006), Bishop of the United Methodist Church in the United States
- Robert Louis Hodapp (1910–1989), American-born Catholic bishop in Belize
