= Georgia, Florida, & Alabama Railway Co. v. Blish Milling Co. =

Georgia, F. & A. R. Co. v. Blish Milling Co.
- Supreme Court of the United States

Argued March 15, 1916 Decided May 8, 1916
- Full case name: Georgia, Florida & Alabama Railway Company v. Blish Milling Company
- Citations: 241 U.S. 190 (more) 36 S. Ct. 541; 60 L. Ed. 948

Holding
- Bill of lading responsibilities

Court membership
- Chief Justice Edward D. White Associate Justices Joseph McKenna · Oliver W. Holmes Jr. William R. Day · Charles E. Hughes; Willis Van Devanter · Mahlon Pitney; James C. McReynolds

Case opinion
- Majority: Hughes, joined by unanimous

John Hedding Blish Founder

Elbridge Blish Thompson Sales Manager & Secretary

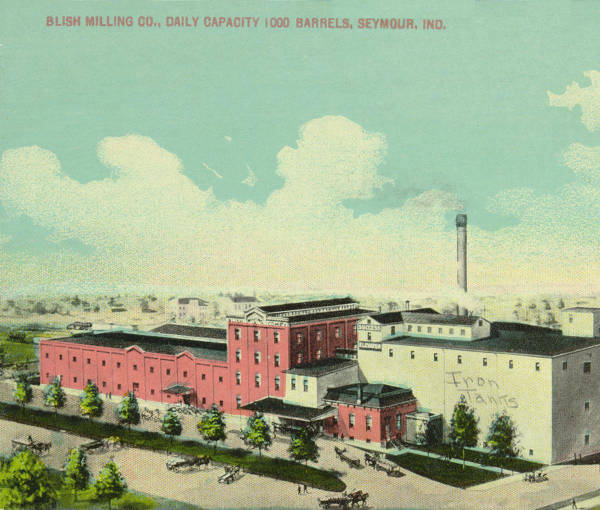
Blish Milling Company c. 1910

Georgia, Florida, & Alabama Railway Co. v. Blish Milling Co., 241 U.S. 190 (1916), was a case decided by the Supreme Court of the United States.

== The Blish Milling Company ==
The Blish Milling Company of Seymour, Indiana, founded by John Blish, son-in-law of the city founder Meedy Shields, shipped flour to Bainbridge, Georgia via the Georgia, Florida and Alabama Railroad. It arrived at its destination with water damage and the Blish Milling Company sued the railroad and the awarded judgment was upheld in Georgia Court of Appeals. The case was then appealed to the Supreme Court of the United States and set a Precedent.

During this time, Blish Thompson, John Blish's grandson, was company secretary and sales manager. He attended Hanover College and Yale University but tragically lost his life in the sinking of the RMS Lusitania. He was a first class passenger on his way to the Netherlands for a business trip.

== See also ==
- List of United States Supreme Court cases, volume 241

== Additional court actions involving Blish Milling Co. ==
- Blish Milling Co. v Detherage, 159 S.W. 816, 155 Ky. 319 Court of Appeals
