= WXKU-FM =

- Austin, Indiana; United States
- Broadcast area: Seymour, Indiana; Scottsburg, Indiana; North Vernon, Indiana
- Frequency: 92.7 MHz
- Branding: Nash Icon 92.7

Programming
- Format: Country music
- Affiliations: Nash Icon

Ownership
- Owner: BK Media, LLC
- Sister stations: WZZB

Technical information
- Licensing authority: FCC
- Facility ID: 3347
- Class: A
- ERP: 3,600 watts
- HAAT: 129 meters (423 ft)
- Transmitter coordinates: 38°49′21″N 85°47′38″W

Links
- Public license information: Public file; LMS
- Website: 92nashicon.com

WXKU 92.7 FM is a radio station broadcasting a country music format. Licensed to Austin, Indiana, the station serves the areas of Seymour, Indiana, Scottsburg, Indiana, and North Vernon, Indiana, and is owned by BK Media, LLC.
