= Southern Indiana Railroad Freighthouse =

- U.S. National Register of Historic Places
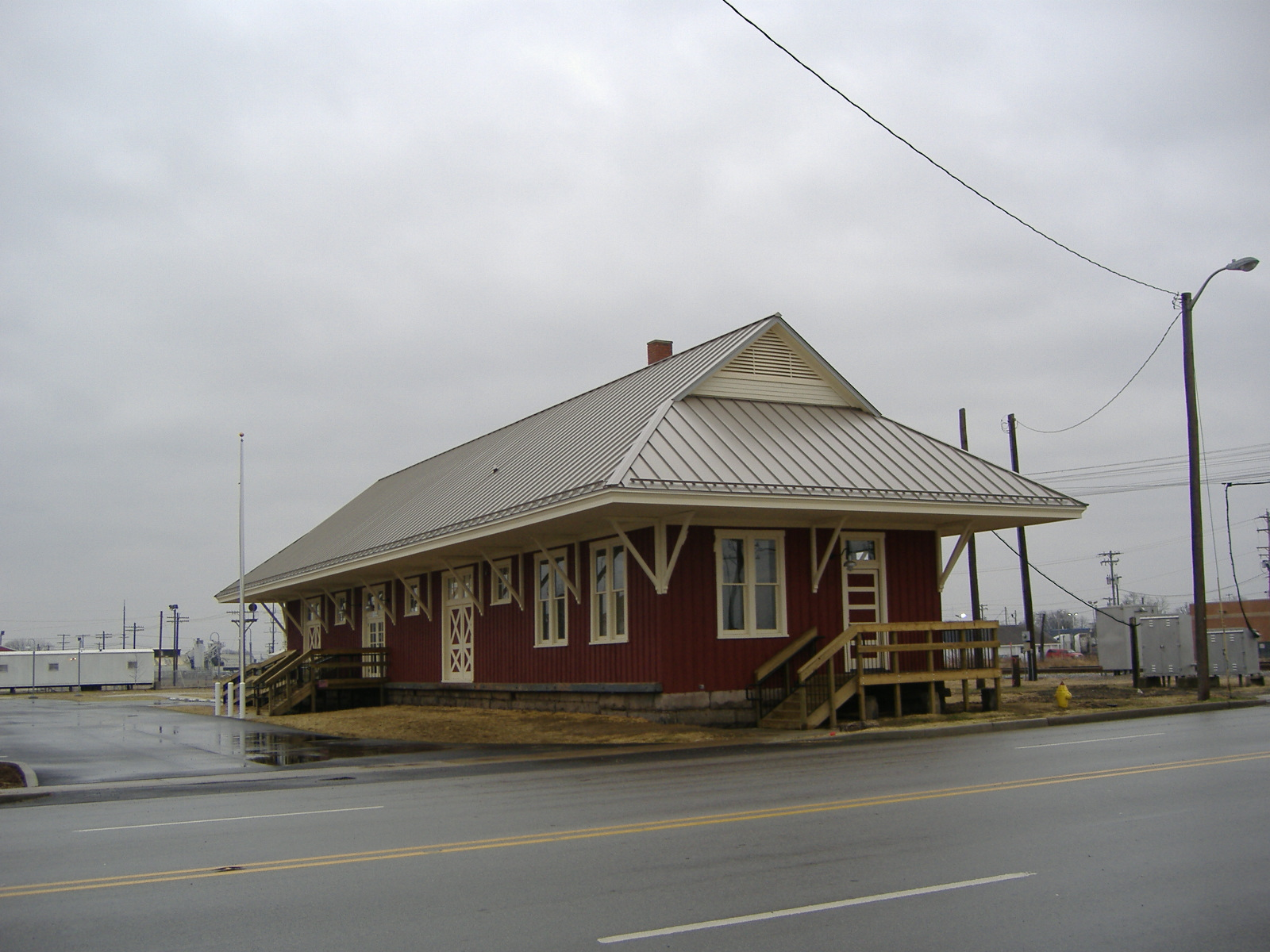

- Location within Indiana Location within the United States
- Location: 105 N. Broadway, Seymour, Indiana
- Coordinates: 38°57′34.36″N 85°53′7.6″W
- Area: less than one acre
- Built: 1901
- Architectural style: Late Victorian
- NRHP reference No.: 03000541
- Added to NRHP: June 22, 2003

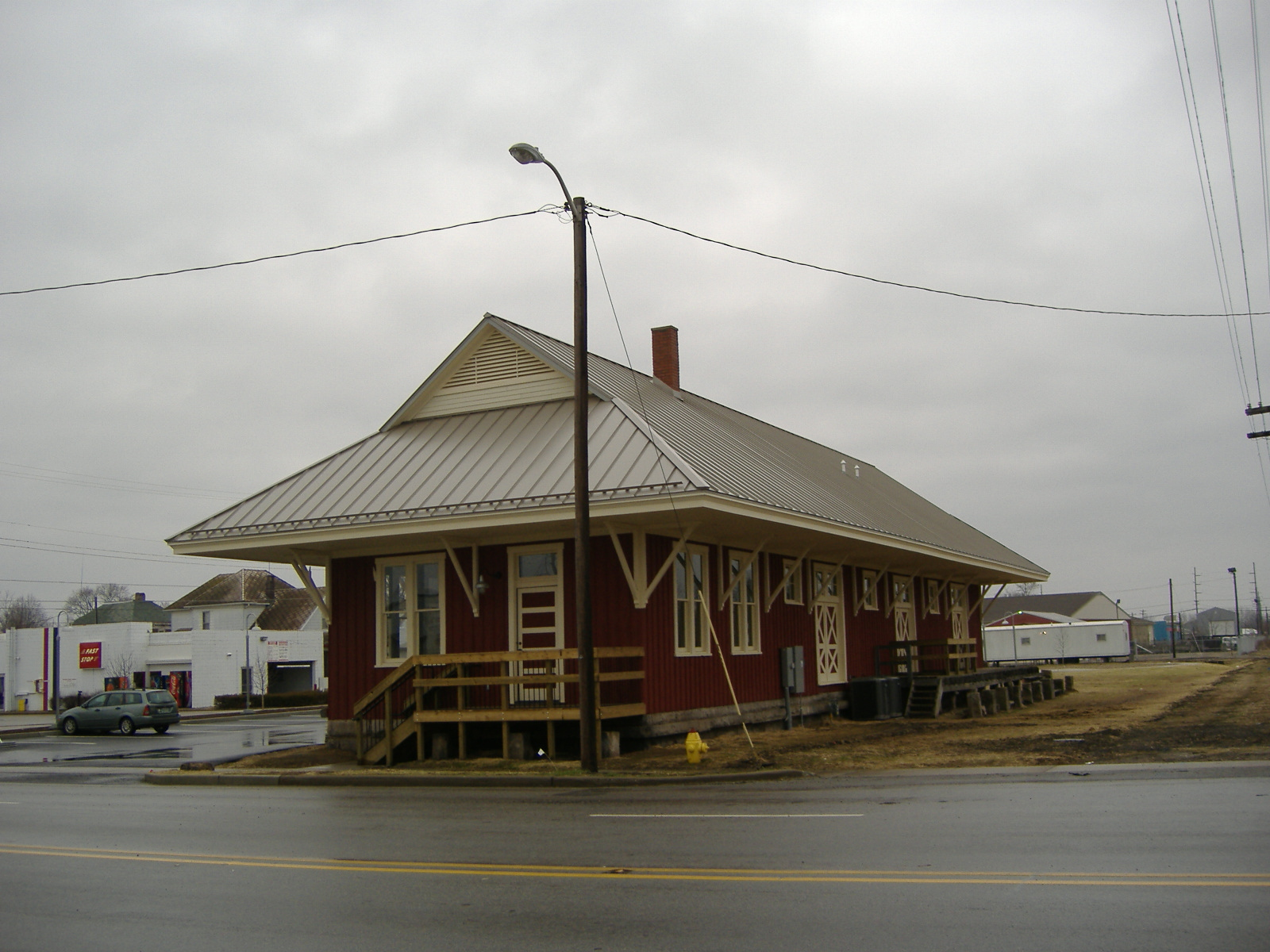
Southside of Freighthouse

The Southern Indiana Railroad Freighthouse, located in Seymour, Indiana, has since January 2008 served as the Jackson County Visitor Center, for Jackson County, Indiana. This freight house was placed on the National Register of Historic Places on June 22, 2003.

Three separate railroads once used the facilities here. These railroads included the Jeffersonville Railroad and the Ohio and Mississippi Line. These facilities included a roundhouse repair shop, the Adams Express Company, and access to interurbans. A passenger depot located next to the freighthouse has been demolished. The Freighthouse has display detailing the history of railroads in Jackson County.

The Freighthouse is a block east of the Seymour Commercial Historic District.
