= Carl Bennett (basketball) =

American basketball coach and executive

Personal information
- Born: December 7, 1915 Rockford, Indiana, U.S.
- Died: May 15, 2013 (aged 97) Fort Wayne, Indiana, U.S.
- Coaching career: 1941–1948

Career history

Coaching
- 1941–1943, 1945–1948: Fort Wayne Zollner Pistons
- 1948: Fort Wayne Pistons

Career coaching record
- BAA: 0–6 (.000)
- Record at Basketball Reference

Carl Blair Bennett (December 7, 1915 – May 15, 2013) was an American professional basketball general manager and head coach. He was born in Rockford, Indiana and began his sports career by playing softball. Bennett was recruited by Fred Zollner in 1938 to join his staff. He coached the Fort Wayne Zollner Pistons of the National Basketball League (NBL) and then the Fort Wayne Pistons of the Basketball Association of America (BAA). for six games in 1948–49. Bennett became the franchise's general manager and served in that capacity from 1948 to 1954. Bennett endured a 15-year campaign to get Zollner inducted into the Naismith Memorial Basketball Hall of Fame, which occurred in 1999. Bennett died at the age of 97 in 2013.

== Head coaching record ==
Legend
Regular season	G	Games coached	W	Games won	L	Games lost	W–L %	Win–loss %
Playoffs	PG	Playoff games	PW	Playoff wins	PL	Playoff losses	PW–L %	Playoff win–loss %

Team	Year	G	W	L	W–L%	Finish	PG	PW	PL	PW–L%	Result
Fort Wayne	1948–49	6	0	6	.000	(replaced)	—	—	—	—	—
