= Frank Niehaus =

American football player (1902–1985)

Profile
- Positions: Fullback, Halfback, Quarterback

Personal information
- Born: March 16, 1902; Seymour, Indiana, United States
- Died: March 1985 (aged 82–83)
- Listed height: 6 ft 0 in (1.83 m)
- Listed weight: 169 lb (77 kg)

Career information
- College: Washington & Jefferson College

Career history
- Akron Pros (1925); Pottsville Maroons (1926)
- Stats at Pro Football Reference

Francis Willard "Fanny" Niehaus (March 16, 1902 - March 1985) was a professional football player from Seymour, Indiana. After attending high school in Akron, Ohio, Niehaus attended Washington & Jefferson College. After college, he made his professional debut in the early National Football League with the Akron Pros in 1925. He later played for the Pottsville Maroons in 1926 before ending his professional football career.
