= Harold Bower (basketball) =

American basketball player (1912–1992)

Personal information
- Born: March 25, 1912 Seymour, Indiana, U.S.
- Died: November 13, 1992 (aged 80) Boynton Beach, Florida, U.S.
- Listed height: 5 ft 10 in (1.78 m)
- Listed weight: 165 lb (75 kg)

Career information
- High school: Morton Memorial (Knightstown, Indiana)
- College: Earlham (1930–1934)
- Position: Guard

Career history

Playing
- 1938: Cincinnati Comellos

Coaching
- 1936–1939: Morton Memorial HS

Harold Elijah Bower (March 25, 1912 – November 13, 1992), sometimes incorrectly named Bowers, was an American professional basketball player. He played for the Cincinnati Comellos in the National Basketball League for two games during the 1937–38 season and averaged 4.5 points per game.

== Career statistics ==
Legend
GP	Games played	FGM	Field goals made
FTM	Free throws made	FTA	Free throws attempted
FT%	Free throw percentage	PTS	Total points
PPG	Points per game	**Bold**	Career high

=== NBL ===
==== Regular season ====
Year	Team	GP	FGM	FTM	PTS	PPG
1937–38	Cincinnati	2	4	1	9	4.5
