= George H. Vehslage House =

Historic house in Indiana, United States

- U.S. National Register of Historic Places
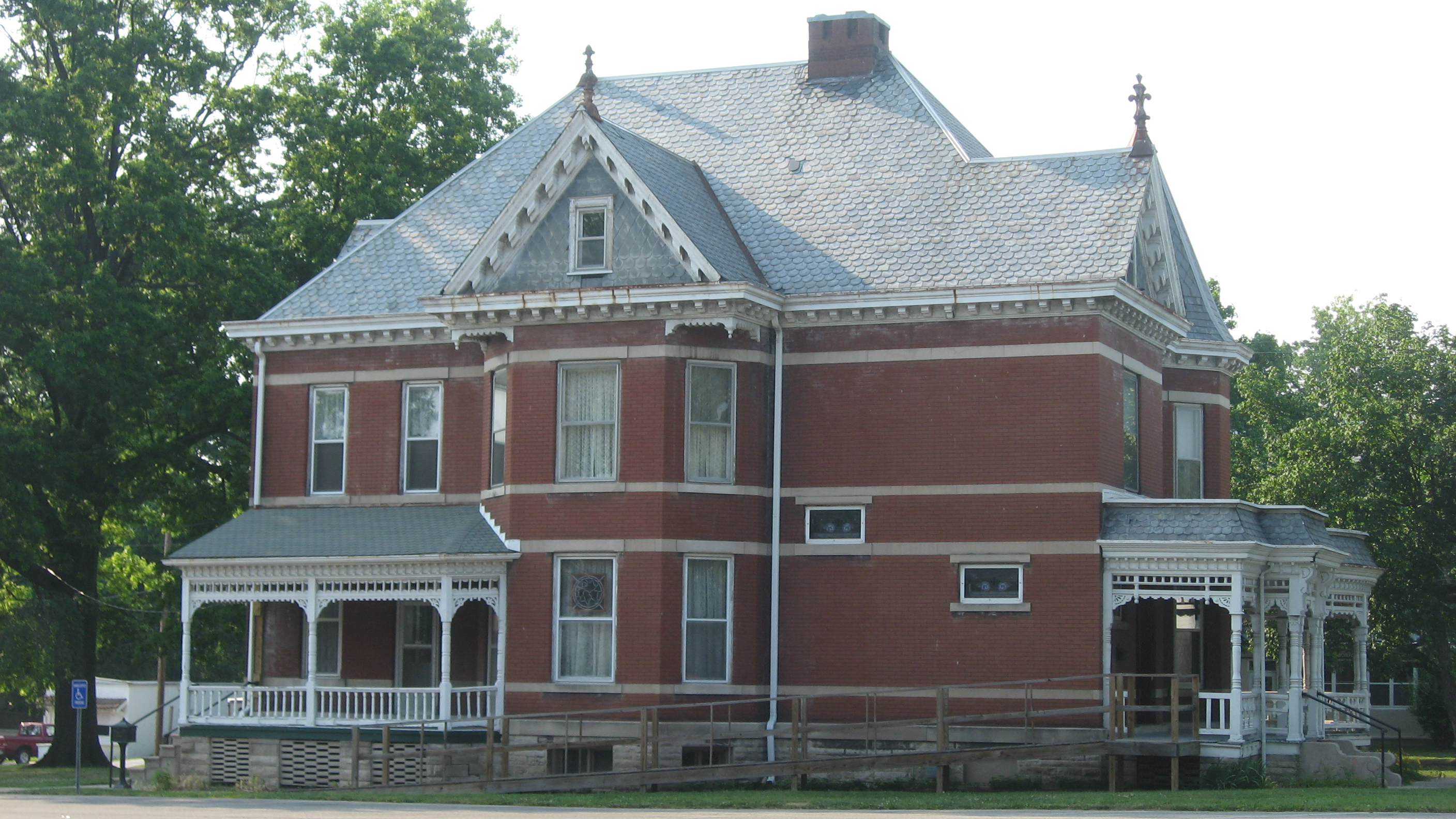
- George H. Vehslage House, June 2011

- Location within Indiana Location within the United States
- Location: 515 N. Chestnut St., Seymour, Indiana
- Coordinates: 38°57′45″N 85°53′32″W
- Area: Less than 1 acre (0.40 ha)
- Built: 1894
- Architectural style: Queen Anne
- NRHP reference No.: 10000775
- Added to NRHP: September 23, 2010

George H. Vehslage House is a historic home located at Seymour, Indiana. It was built in 1894, and is a 2 1/2-story, Queen Anne style brick dwelling with a limestone foundation. It features a corner tower with a hexagonal roof, irregular floorplan, and one-story full-width front porch with ornate woodwork. Also on the property is a two-story carriage house.

It was listed on the National Register of Historic Places in 2010.
