= Seymour Reds =

Semi-professional baseball team in Seymour, Indiana

Information
- League: Southern Indiana League (1930s)
- Location: Seymour, Indiana
- Ballpark: Redland Park
- Founded: 1900
- Manager: Alf Snyder (1930s)

The Seymour Reds were a semi-professional baseball team based in Seymour, Indiana. A club of that name was first organized in 1900, and a team called the Seymour Reds competed in the Southern Indiana League, a regional semi-professional circuit, during the 1930s. The club is best remembered for its 1937 season, when future Baseball Hall of Fame shortstop Pee Wee Reese played for the team before beginning his professional career.

== History ==
=== Founding ===
The Seymour Reds were organized on March 8, 1900, at a meeting of local baseball enthusiasts at the Arlington house in Seymour. The founding club was amateur, drawn from what the Seymour Daily Democrat described as "the best talent in the city," with ambitions to compete with any amateur organization in Indiana.

=== Southern Indiana League ===
By the 1930s, a semi-professional club bearing the Seymour Reds name competed in the Southern Indiana League against teams from nearby communities including Columbus, North Vernon, and Madison. The team was considered semi-professional because some of its players were paid. The Reds played home games on Sunday afternoons at Redland Park, located at Eighth and Blish streets, drawing crowds of several hundred spectators.

The club was managed in the 1930s by Alf Snyder, who also appeared as a player. In addition to league play, the Reds hosted exhibition games against barnstorming clubs; in 1938 Snyder booked the Zulu Cannibals, a barnstorming all-Black team, for an exhibition at Redland Park. In August 1938 the club also played one of its first night games, a Southern Indiana League contest at Columbus under a newly installed lighting system.

=== 1937 season and Pee Wee Reese ===
The Reds held first place in the Southern Indiana League late in the 1937 season. The club's shortstop that year was Pee Wee Reese, then a teenager from the Louisville area, whose defensive play drew particular praise in contemporary coverage; an August 1937 game account credited Reese with "three outstanding plays" in a 3–1 win over the Huff Cardinals. Reese later recalled that his first professional contract with the club paid $5 a game "plus all the milk he could drink." After his season with Seymour, Reese signed with the Louisville Colonels of the American Association, and reached the major leagues with the Brooklyn Dodgers in 1940. He was inducted into the Baseball Hall of Fame in 1984.

Reese's teammates on the 1937 club included third baseman Ernie Andres, who later played for the Boston Red Sox and served as head baseball coach at Indiana University from 1948 to 1973. Andres recalled his season with the Reds as Reese's teammate in a 1962 appearance in Seymour.

=== Later years ===
The club continued to field teams after World War II; the Reds were still playing as of 1961. (Note: Fill in the 1961 citation. If a "last documented season" is established from the newspaper record, this section can state it as such; no source has been located documenting the club's dissolution.)
