= William Wilkinson Reno =

United States Army medical officer (1872–1918)

- Born: May 10, 1872; Seymour, Indiana, U.S.
- Died: March 21, 1918 (aged 45); North Atlantic Ocean (lost at sea)
- Burial place: Commemorated on the Tablets of the Missing, Suresnes American Cemetery and Memorial, Suresnes, France
- Spouse: Ruth Steere Kelley (m. 1908)
- Relatives: Reno Gang (uncles)
- Military career
- Allegiance: United States
- Branch: United States Army
- Service years: 1898–1918
- Rank: Lieutenant Colonel
- Unit: Medical Corps
- Commands: Camp Funston; Fort Riley
- Conflicts: Boxer Rebellion; Philippine–American War; World War I
- Other work: School administrator; inventor of medical equipment

William Wilkinson Reno (May 10, 1872 – March 21, 1918) was an officer in the United States Army Medical Corps who served from 1898 until his death in 1918. (Note: Reno's memorial at Suresnes records his rank as lieutenant colonel, while his 1918 obituary refers to him throughout as "colonel." During World War I, U.S. Army officers commonly held a permanent grade in the Regular Army alongside a higher temporary grade in the National Army for the duration of the war; the two sources may therefore reflect his permanent (lieutenant colonel) and temporary (colonel) ranks respectively. The discrepancy has not been resolved against the Official Army Register.) Born in Seymour, Indiana, he was a grandson of J. Wilkison Reno and a nephew of the members of the Reno Gang, the post–Civil War outlaw band credited with one of the first peacetime train robberies in the United States. (Note: Reno's father, Clinton ("Honest Clint") Reno, was the one brother who did not ride with the gang.) After brief careers in education, Reno commissioned into the Army around the time of the Spanish–American War and served through the Boxer Rebellion and multiple postings in the Philippines. He commanded Camp Funston and Fort Riley, Kansas, before being sent to France in late 1917. He was lost overboard from the troop transport USS Susquehanna in the North Atlantic on March 21, 1918, and his body was never recovered.

== Early life and family ==
Reno was born on May 10, 1872, in Seymour, Indiana, in Jackson County. His grandfather, J. Wilkison Reno, was a prosperous Jackson County landowner whose sons Frank, John, Simeon, and William formed the Reno Gang. Reno's father, Clinton, was the brother who did not take part in the gang's crimes and was consequently known as "Honest Clint"; he later moved to Kansas and died in 1921.

== Education and early career ==
Reno graduated from the University of Kansas in 1893. Before entering the Army he worked in education, serving as principal of the Minneapolis city schools in 1894 and 1895.

== Military career ==
Reno was commissioned into the Army Medical Department in 1898, around the time of the Spanish–American War, and his early service coincided with the Boxer Rebellion in China. He was stationed in the Philippines on several occasions during the period of the Philippine–American War and subsequent American occupation.

By the time of World War I Reno had risen to lieutenant colonel—he is referred to as a colonel in contemporary accounts—and served as commanding officer at Camp Funston and Fort Riley in Kansas. In October 1917 he was sent from Camp Funston to France in charge of the American Ambulance Service.

Contemporary accounts also credited Reno with the design of medical equipment, including a hypodermic syringe and a wheeled stretcher for hospital and field use, said to have been adopted by the war departments of several countries. (Note: These claims appear in Reno's 1918 obituary in the Cape Girardeau Republican; they have not been independently verified through patent records.)

== Death ==
On March 21, 1918, Reno was lost from the United States troop transport USS Susquehanna in the North Atlantic. The waters were searched but his body was never recovered. Notice of his loss was conveyed to his sister, Mrs. Seth Babcock of Cape Girardeau, Missouri, by telegram from Washington. The Susquehanna, a former North German Lloyd liner named Rhein that had been seized in 1917 and converted to a U.S. Navy transport, had — in an irony of her history — carried German troops to the Boxer Rebellion in 1900.

Reno is commemorated on the Tablets of the Missing at Suresnes American Cemetery and Memorial near Paris. He had married his wife, Ruth (Kelley) Reno, in 1908, and they had two children.
