= Seymour Commercial Historic District =

Historic district in Indiana, United States

- U.S. National Register of Historic Places
- U.S. Historic district
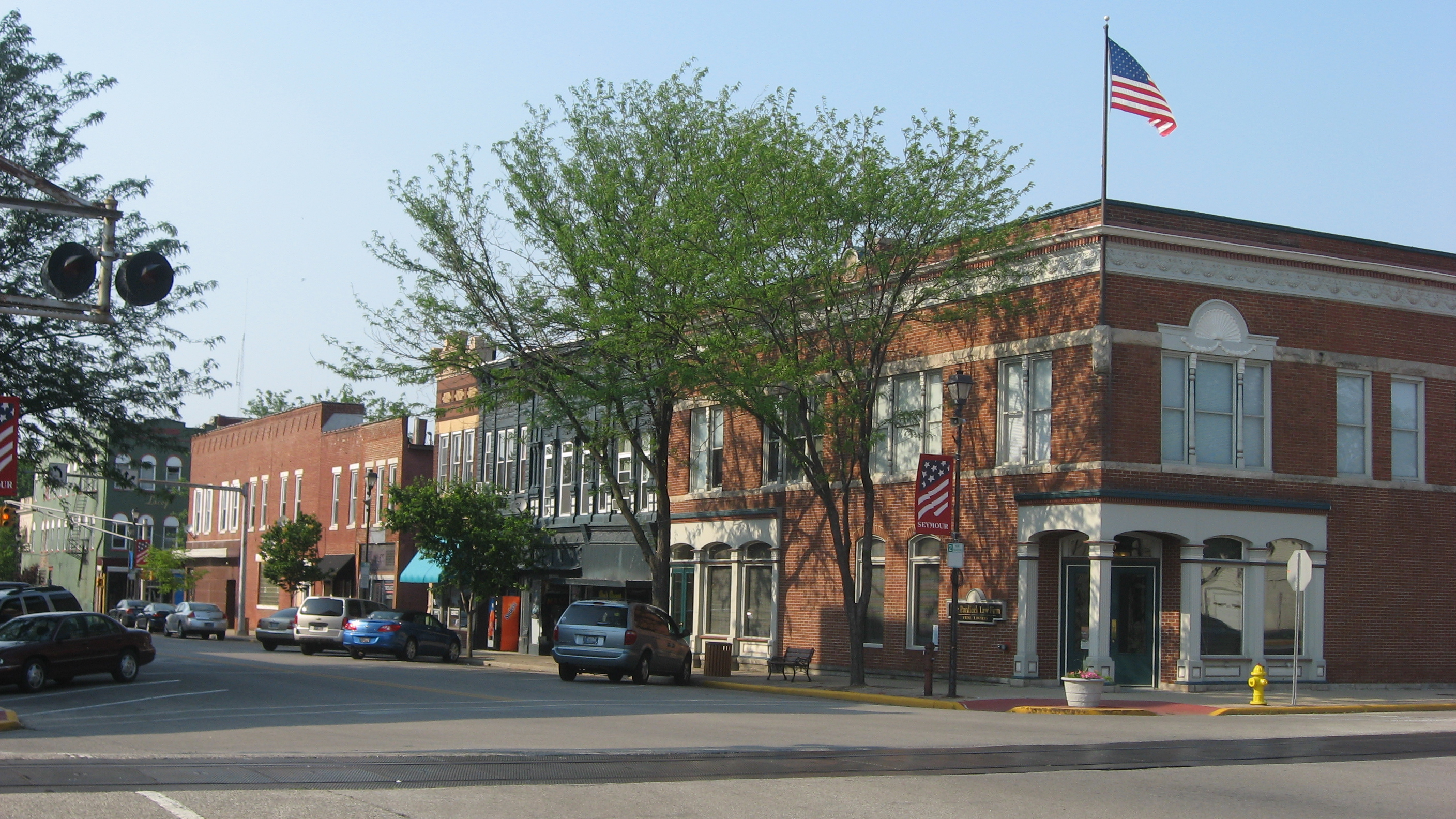
- Chestnut and St. Louis in Seymour, June 2011

- Location within Indiana Location within the United States
- Location: Roughly bounded by Walnut, Third, Ewing and Bruce Sts., Seymour, Indiana
- Coordinates: 38°57′28″N 85°53′21″W
- Area: 34 acres (14 ha)
- Built: 1876
- Architect: Abraham and Sons; Wetmore, James
- Architectural style: Italianate, Romanesque, Classical Revival
- NRHP reference No.: 95000708
- Added to NRHP: June 9, 1995

Seymour Commercial Historic District is a national historic district located at Seymour, Indiana. It encompasses 79 contributing buildings and four contributing structures in the central business district of Seymour. The district developed between about 1876 and 1945, and includes notable examples of Italianate, Romanesque Revival, and Classical Revival style architecture. Located in the district is the separately listed Farmers Club. Other notable buildings include the Masonic Temple (1901), Richart Block (1900), Steinker Meat Market (c. 1885), Seymour National Bank (c. 1920), Southern Indiana Telephone and Telegraph Building (1929), Jonas Hotel (c 1876), and Kidd Saloon (1887).

It was listed on the National Register of Historic Places in 1995.
