= Seymour, Indiana =

- City
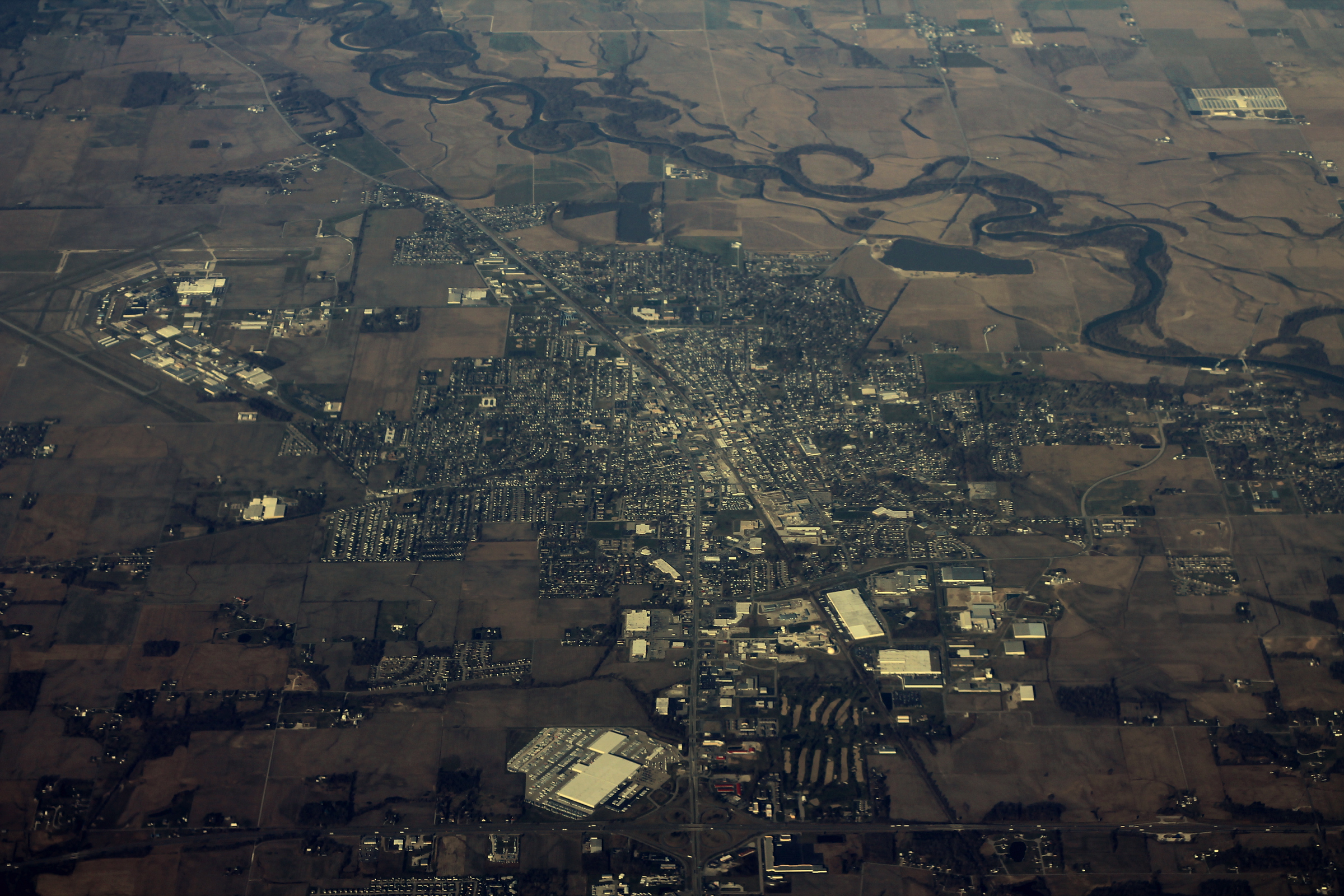
- Aerial view of Seymour

- Flag Logo
- Nickname: "Crossroads of Southern Indiana"
- Location of Seymour in Jackson County, Indiana

- Location of Seymour in the United States
- Coordinates: 38°57′26″N 85°53′40″W
- Country: United States
- State: Indiana
- County: Jackson
- Townships: Jackson, Redding, Rockford
- Founding and Incorporation (town): April 27, 1852
- Incorporated (city): 1864
- Founder: Meedy Shields
- Named for: Hezekiah Cook Seymour, Civil Engineer

Government
  - Type: Mayor–council
  - Mayor: Matt Nicholson (R)
  - State Senate: Eric Koch (R)
  - State House: Jim Lucas (R)

Area
  - City: 11.42 sq mi (29.59 km^{2})
  - Land: 11.42 sq mi (29.58 km^{2})
  - Water: 0.0039 sq mi (0.01 km^{2})
- Elevation: 581 ft (177 m)

Population (2020)
  - City: 21,569
  - Density: 1,777.8/sq mi (686.41/km^{2})
  - Urban: 21,579
- Time zone: UTC−05:00 (EST)
  - Summer (DST): UTC−04:00 (EDT)
- ZIP Codes: ZIP codes: 47274
- Area codes: 812 & 930
- FIPS code: 18-68832
- GNIS feature ID: 2395850
- Website: www.seymourin.org

Seymour is a city in Jackson County, Indiana, United States. The population was 21,569 at the 2020 census, making it the largest city in Jackson County. It was platted in 1852 by landowner Meedy Shields and named after a railroad engineer.

Seymour developed as a railroad town after the north–south Jeffersonville Railroad and the east–west Ohio and Mississippi Railroad intersected in the early 1850s, leading to the city to be nicknamed the "Crossroads of Southern Indiana." In October 1866, the local Reno Gang carried out what is considered to be the first peacetime train robbery in the United States—an episode that brought vigilante reprisals and lasting notoriety. During World War II the U.S. Army Air Forces operated Freeman Army Airfield southwest of the city, a training base later known for the 1945 Freeman Field mutiny, a milestone in the desegregation of the U.S. military.

The modern economy is anchored by manufacturing and distribution led by the automotive-parts maker Aisin, which opened a Seymour plant in the 1980s. Beginning in the late 1980s, the city drew substantial immigration from San Sebastián Coatán, Guatemala. Its Hispanic population grew rapidly in the early 21st century, reshaping the community and drawing state scrutiny of the city's policing policies in 2024. Seymour is the hometown of rock musician John Mellencamp and holds an annual Oktoberfest reflecting its 19th-century German heritage.

== History ==
=== 19th century ===
The land around Seymour was inhabited by the Lenape (Delaware), who had been displaced westward from the Delaware River valley. The 1805 Treaty of Grouseland opened the area to white settlement. After the 1812 Pigeon Roost massacre, the Battle of Tipton's Island took place, where Major John Tipton and some thirty men overcame a larger party of Native raiders. Native Americans killed fifteen settlers between 1811 and 1815, and by 1816—the year Indiana attained statehood—only five families remained in the area. In 1817 the state built a blockhouse to trade with the Lenape until they ceded the land under the 1818 Treaty of St. Mary's, after which the county saw significant depopulation between 1822 and 1832.

The first settler on the land that became Seymour was James Shields, who arrived with his family in 1816 and built on the property that is now the old city cemetery. In 1820, Shields received a land patent for his homestead. His son, Captain Meedy W. Shields, inherited the land and developed it into a prosperous farm. The site later became known as "Mule Crossing": according to an 1881 account, the first shipment of goods sent over the newly completed railroad was marked "Mule Crossing" because Shields kept a great many mules that gave the railroad's engineers trouble, and the engineers bestowed the name on the place.

Meedy Shields and his wife, platted Seymour on April 27, 1852, near the 1809 Indian treaty corner. A north–south railroad linking the Ohio River at Jeffersonville to Indianapolis had been built across the Shields farm in the late 1840s. When the east–west Ohio and Mississippi Railroad was surveyed through the county in 1852, Shields persuaded it to cross the first line on his land and, in return, agreed to name the town for the railroad's civil engineer. The earliest county history, published in 1886, identifies him only as "the chief contractor and civil engineer, Mr. Seymour," who was the superintendent over the construction of the Ohio and Mississippi Railway from North Vernon to St. Louis. Later accounts name him Hezekiah C. Seymour, while others instead credit a surveyor named J. Seymour. Hezekiah C. Seymour, formerly state engineer and surveyor of New York and superintendent of the New York and Erie Railroad, had become a principal contractor of the Ohio and Mississippi in the spring of 1852, when he took up railroad construction contracts exceeding $35 million. Seymour's first newspaper, the Seymour Times, was established in 1857 by Dr. Jasper R. Monroe, who brought the paper from Rockford. (Note: Sources differ on the Rockford Herald's founding date: the Tribune's 1920 history of Seymour newspapers places it in 1856, "the year previous" to the move, while Monroe's 1891 obituary states the paper was established at Rockford in 1855.) The Times was published as a Republican paper.

==== The Civil War ====
Seymour was an important waypoint for the movement of men and supplies during the war due to the rail lines connecting with larger cities such as Indianapolis, Chicago, Detroit, and St. Louis. Despite southern Indiana's strong Copperhead political sentiment, the city of Seymour and the surrounding area raised three separate infantry units for service in the Union Army. Volunteers were organized at Camp Heffren in Seymour. These included the 50th Indiana Infantry Regiment, commanded by former Indiana Secretary of State Colonel Cyrus L. Dunham, as well as Company C of the 10th Indiana Cavalry Regiment. The 50th Indiana was present at the Battle of Parker's Crossroads against Nathan Bedford Forrest, as was the 10th Indiana Cavalry in skirmishes near Pulaski and during the 1864 Nashville Campaign. Company H of the 6th Indiana Infantry Regiment was also raised in Seymour and commanded by Captain Fielder A. Jones. These men fought at Shiloh (2nd Day), Stones River, Chickamauga, Missionary Ridge, and through the Atlanta Campaign, ending in the capture of that city.

The area's divided politics produced a notable incident on September 5, 1862, when Jason B. Brown—a Brownstown lawyer, Democrat, and later a three-term U.S. representative from the district—delivered a speech at Seymour after which a recruiting officer of the 15th Indiana Volunteers filed a charge with the state adjutant general accusing him of using "treasonable language" in public against the government. Brown was taken to Indianapolis, where the deputy United States marshal declined to entertain the charge, and it was dismissed without trial; the Democratic press presented the arrest as part of an effort to intimidate Democratic voters before the fall election. Elected to the Indiana House of Representatives the following month, Brown offered the resolutions creating the House's select Committee on Arbitrary Arrests in January 1863 and led its investigation.

Captain Fielder A. Jones, was wounded early in the war and later raised an additional company of Jackson County men, who elected him colonel. By 1865 he had transferred to the 8th Indiana Cavalry and had been promoted to colonel, shortly before being brevetted to brigadier general. After his discharge, he moved to Missouri to practice law.

On July 10, 1863, as Confederate Brigadier General John Hunt Morgan and his cavalry sacked nearby Salem, Major General John Love of the Indiana Legion (militia) arrived in Seymour from New Albany to take command of the city defenses. Over the next day, Love used Seymour as a staging ground to gather a force to repel Morgan's next attack, which they believed would target the Ohio & Mississippi Railroad at Mitchell, Seymour, or Vernon. His force included elements of the 63rd Indiana and 69th Indiana Volunteer Infantry Regiments, the 1st Michigan Sharpshooters, the 15th Indiana (Von Sehlen's) Battery of Light Artillery, and a few Indiana Legion militia units. As Morgan moved on Vernon on July 11, Love took his force of about 1,000 men to meet him, placing Captain Meedy Shields in charge of the Seymour defenses in his absence. Shields, who had organized and trained many local mounted militia units, in Love's words "rendered invaluable service" during the Morgan's Raid crisis.

Six officers escaped on January 20, 1864, during a transfer of Confederate prisoners of war. One was later recaptured in town. The New York Times reported that on January 22, 1864, a "soldiers' riot" took place, in which two soldiers were killed and several others were injured.

During the war, the 50th Indiana Infantry lost 3 officers and 54 enlisted men due to being killed or mortally wounded, and 3 officers and 158 enlisted men to disease, for a total of 218 dead. Colonel Dunham, a Democrat, faced wartime accusations of disloyalty and was criticized for his conduct at the September 1862 surrender of Munfordville, Kentucky. He left the regiment in 1863. Lieutenant Colonel Horace Heffren resigned in September 1862 and was replaced by Major Samuel T. Wells—a Vallonia native and former sheriff of Jackson County (1846–1847). Wells commanded the regiment after Dunham's departure until the 50th was consolidated into the 52nd Indiana Infantry Regiment, through the war's end.

During the Civil War, Seymour and Jackson County fielded a total of 2,571 volunteers for the Union cause.

==== The Reno era ====
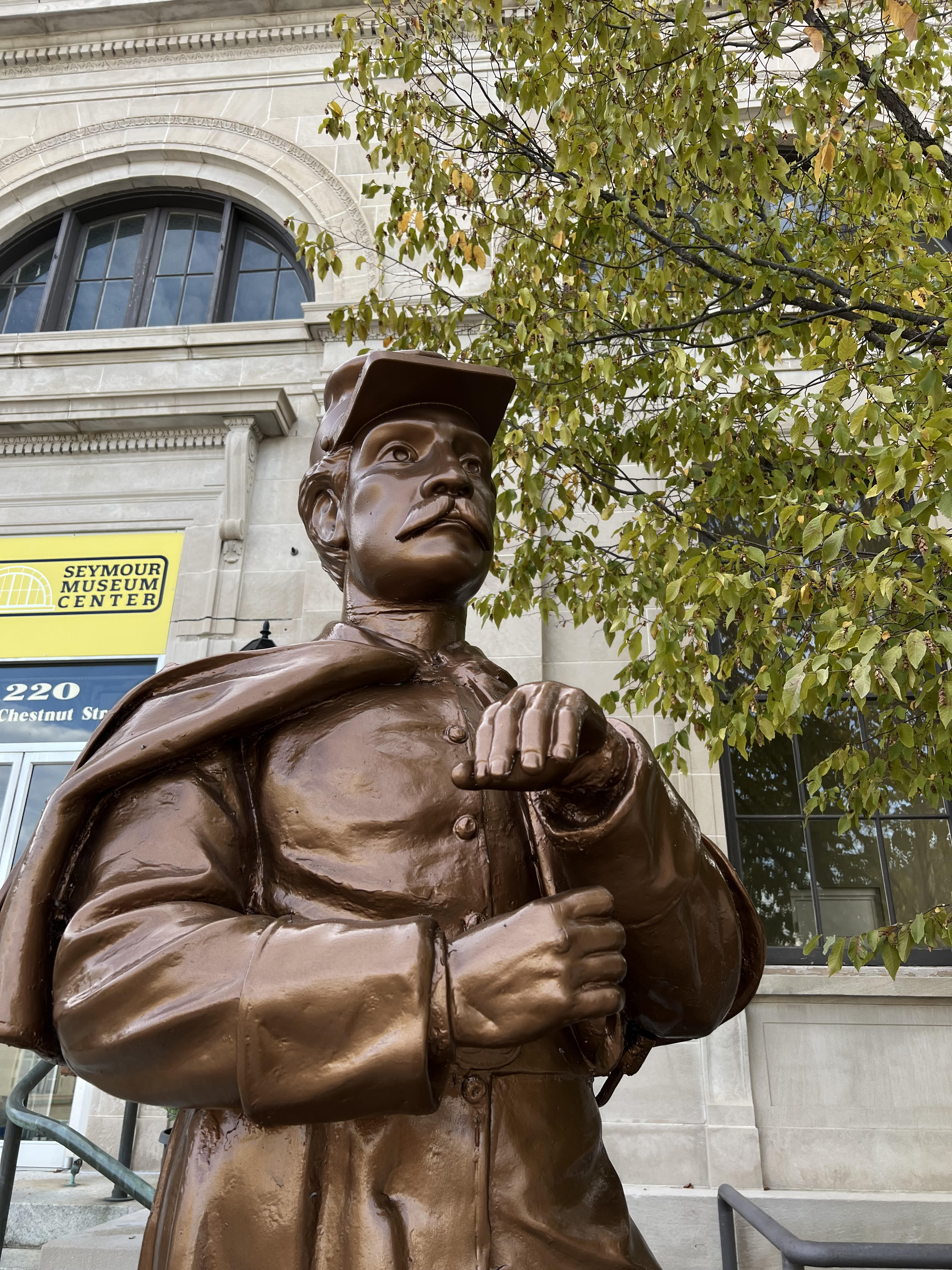
Billy Yank, the statue honoring Seymour's Civil War veterans, was newly restored in 2023 after being vandalized and stored for more than 40 years.

The Rader House is described in early county histories as one of Seymour's leading hotels. It became a haven for the Reno Gang during the mid-1860s and travelers who lodged there were frequently robbed.

In January 1866, Moore Woodmansee, a wealthy merchant from nearby Medora, stopped at the Rader House while traveling to Cincinnati to buy goods. He disappeared from his room. That October, his body—the head severed—was recovered from the East Fork of the White River. A hotel employee, Gordon Kinney, was suspected and was shot dead during the investigation. The proprietor, Captain George Rader, was arrested but acquitted. The killing was considered unsolved until 1872, when a dying man named Reuben Wheeler confessed that two men had used Rader's wagon to dispose of the body on the night of the murder.

After the war, local veterans organized the Ellsworth Post 20 of the G.A.R. At its peak, the post included two hundred and twenty-two local citizens who had served the Union during the war as members. The Ellsworth Post was active in local charities, organized burial services for local veterans, and conducted official observances on Decoration Day. The final member of the post, James H Boak, lived to be 98 years old. He died in 1942, closing one of the longest-running G.A.R. chapters.

A robbery of the Adams Express Car on the east-west Ohio and Mississippi line near Brownstown was reported in July 1866. That night, the perpetrators were chased by a local vigilance committee of 300 men that continued into the Rockford area. Three days later, the Reno brothers had been identified as the gang's leaders and newspapers were recounting the family's crimes. On October 6, 1866, the local Reno Gang robbed an Ohio and Mississippi Railroad train. The holdup is often described as the first robbery of a moving train in the United States during peacetime. The 1886 county history records that the gang boarded the train a short distance east of Seymour, rifled one safe of about $15,000, and rolled a second safe holding roughly $30,000 from the moving car. The second safe and its contents were recovered intact after the robbers were pursued. Some members of the gang were later lynched at Hangman's Crossing outside town.

The gang struck again in May 1868, stopping a train at Marshfield, in Scott County, cutting it in two and running the looted express car to within sight of Seymour. An early county historian, H. M. Beadle, described the years from 1863 to 1868 in Jackson County as "a perfect carnival of crime". In response, citizens masked in red organized a vigilance committee that carried out the lynchings of suspected gang members.

On September 28, 1867, a second train was held up near the same location. Initially blamed on the Renos, the copycat robbery was the work of two local men, Walker Hammond and Michael Colleran, who escaped with as much as $8,000. John Reno tracked Hammond down, beat him, and turned him over to the sheriff. Hammond and Colleran were indicted in February 1868.

Vigilante retribution peaked in 1868. On July 10, three gang members being transported by train were seized near Seymour and hanged from a beech tree by masked men of the Jackson County Vigilance Committee. Days later, three more members—Henry Jerrell, Frank Sparks, and John Moore—were captured in Illinois, returned, and hanged from the same tree. On the night of December 11, 1868, a darkened train left the Seymour depot of the Jeffersonville, Madison and Indianapolis Railroad carrying roughly 100 vigilantes in scarlet masks. They reached New Albany before dawn and the men marched to the Floyd County jail where they lynched Frank, William, and Simeon Reno along with gang member Charlie Anderson. Frank Reno and Anderson had been extradited from Canada and were in federal custody when they were killed. The lynchings drew protests from Canada and Great Britain, an apology from U.S. Secretary of State William H. Seward, and international press coverage. No one involved with the lynchings were charged for the crime.

About 1876, a general strike of approximately 500 railroad men occurred at Seymour and nearby North Vernon, Indiana. It was led by armed brakemen, engineers, and other railroad employees who had not been paid for two and a half months by the Ohio and Mississippi Railroad. A paper reported that the communities of Seymour and North Vernon were armed and in revolt. A contingent of US Marshals and detectives was sent from Cincinnati to end the strike. All passenger and cargo service through Seymour and North Vernon was suspended during the strike.

Vigilante violence, including "White Cap" regulators, remained active in rural Jackson County through 1901, with documented attacks at Shields in 1897 and near Maumee in 1901.

The town's first high school was built in 1871 on the vacant lot of the disbanded civil war encampment. Frank B Shields, a Seymour native, former MIT professor, and inventor of Barbasol shaving cream, subsequently donated the adjacent land needed for the construction of the James Shields Memorial Gym.

In 1880, the Seymour Weekly Democrat noted that Seymour's population was nearly 5,000. There were four schools with 700 students, and four hotels.

During the years prior to the turn of the 20th century, Seymour saw an influx of Dutch and German migrants of the Lutheran faith. These migrants established many local farms and businesses. Their influence continues to be seen in the city's annual Oktoberfest celebration.

=== 20th century ===
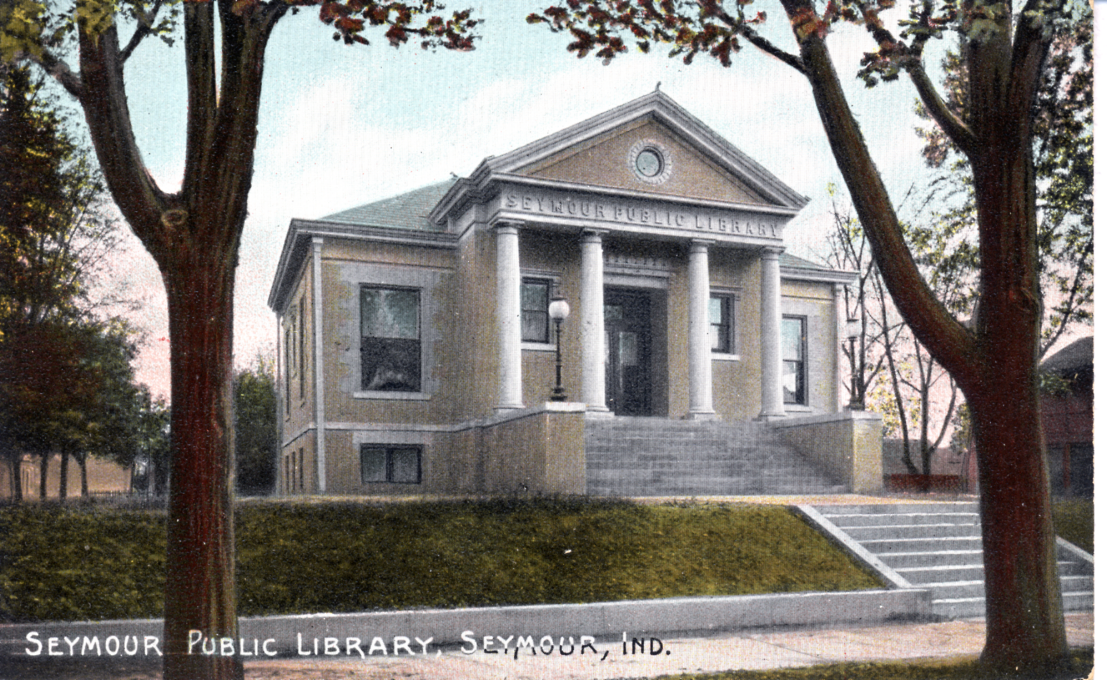
Seymour Indiana Public Library, ca. 1910

Seymour fielded its own minor-league team, the Seymour Reds, beginning in 1900. The future Hall of Famer Pee Wee Reese played for the club before reaching the majors. The team played at Redlands Park.

The Seymour Public Library opened in January 1905 after a $10,000 grant from the Carnegie library program in 1903. Earlier collections had been kept in a local bookshop and at Shields High School. The new building was among more than 160 Carnegie libraries funded in Indiana—more than in any other state.

On October 22, 1908, William Howard Taft, the Republican nominee for president, drew a crowd of about 10,000 people to a campaign speech at the Chestnut Street railroad crossing during a whistle-stop tour of Indiana two weeks before he won the election.

In 1913 the Great Flood struck Seymour. It was the deadliest natural disaster in the area's history, as the East Fork of the White River crested 27.50 feet (8.38 m) above the level of the 1884 flood.

==== World wars ====
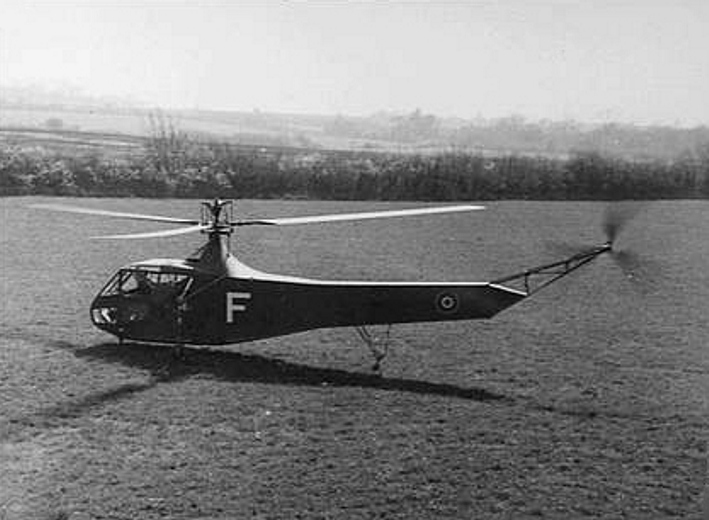
Sikorsky R-4, ca. 1945

On May 7, 1915, the Seymour industrialist Elbridge Blish Thompson died in the sinking of the RMS Lusitania. His family endowed a memorial scholarship at Shields High School for any student admitted to Yale University.

The 1918–19 influenza pandemic struck Jackson County in two waves. After the first wave began in October 1918, county officials were under public pressure to reopen schools, churches, and businesses. Citing local health authorities' view that the danger had passed, officials reopened the county on November 2, while thirty other Indiana counties remained closed. The second wave struck within ten days. By mid-December, the county had recorded 1,547 cases, about 6.5% of its population, and the county health officer estimated the true figure was likely double that.

During World War II the federal government bought 2,500 acres (1,000 ha) southwest of town for an airfield. Local veterans had proposed naming it for a Seymour sailor killed at Pearl Harbor, but it became Freeman Army Airfield. It operated from 1942 to 1946. Construction of 413 structures and four 5,500-foot runways was supervised by the U.S. Army Corps of Engineers. The base trained pilots on twin-engine aircraft on Beechcraft AT-10 Wichita. There were 19 graduating classes with 4,245 cadets trained before the last class in May 1944. The training was commanded by Colonel Elmer T. Rundquist, a former University of Illinois football player who had served as the base's project officer before taking command.

Freeman Field also became the first helicopter training base in the United States. Preparations were made in secrecy in 1944, when the aircraft were still new. Six Sikorsky R-4 helicopters were flown in directly from the Sikorsky plant at Bridgeport, Connecticut, in what was then the longest-distance formation flight of helicopters.

In 1945 the base was the site of the Freeman Field mutiny, in which African American officers of the 477th Bombardment Group sought to integrate an all-white officers' club. The protest was directed at the segregated clubs enforced by the group's commander, Colonel Robert R. Selway Jr., who was subsequently relieved of command and replaced by Colonel Benjamin O. Davis Jr. Historians of the Civil Rights Movement regard the episode as an important step toward desegregation of the U.S. military.

Near the war's end, Freeman Field served as the Foreign Aircraft Evaluation Center. It received captured German and Italian aircraft gathered under "Operation Lusty." Arriving aircraft were assigned "FE" (Foreign Evaluation) numbers, and the collection was kept from the public until September 1945, when the field was opened to the press. These operations were soon relocated, and the field was deactivated and deeded to the city in 1946. When the War Assets Administration disposed of the surplus base, 2,241 acres became a municipal airport, more than 240 acres went to Seymour Community Schools for agricultural training, and more than 60 acres went to the Seymour Industrial Association to develop an industrial park. This became the city's postwar industrial district. The property was formally sold in November 1948.

==== Mid-century ====
During the last week of June 1952, Seymour held a week-long centennial celebration featuring concerts, parades, a play titled "The Seymour Story," and a re-enactment of the Reno brothers' train robbery, for which the B&O Railroad loaned a vintage engine and cars from its Baltimore museum. Local businesses paid employees in silver dollars during the festivities to mark the occasion.

Beginning in 1959, the old Shields High School closed and students transferred to the new Seymour High School. By 1970 the district had completed what was then the second-largest high-school gymnasium in the United States. It was renamed the Lloyd E. Scott Gymnasium in 1981 for the Indiana Basketball Hall of Fame coach.

During the 1960 presidential campaign, Senator John F. Kennedy stopped at Freeman Field on April 29, 1960, days before the Indiana primary. Suffering from laryngitis and unable to speak, Kennedy greeted the several hundred people who had gathered by handing out cards that read, "Sorry, I have a bad throat and cannot talk, but please vote for me anyway."

==== Late century ====
In the 1970s, several deaths in the Seymour area were linked to the egg producer Rose Acre Farms. Three employees connected to founder David Rust died under circumstances that remained unresolved. One of the bodies was found in the trunk of her burned car weeks after she disappeared. Despite investigations and reporting by the Louisville Courier Journal, no charges were brought against Rust.

Mayor Christopher D. Moritz resigned on March 29, 1983, after being convicted of four counts of accepting bribes while in office. Moritz was sentenced to five years in prison and barred from public office for ten years. His sentence began in December 1984. Donald Scott served the remainder of the term until William Bailey took office.

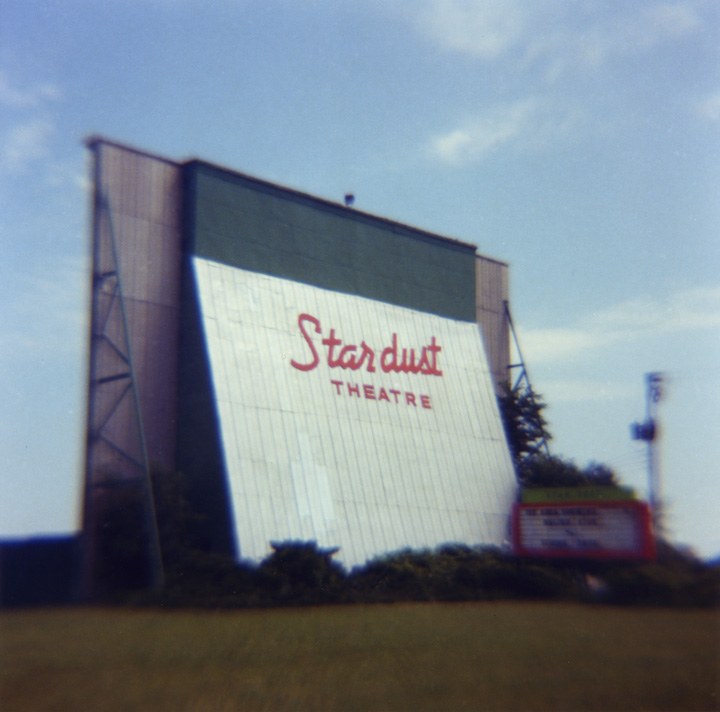
Stardust Theater, ca. 1986

The Stardust Theater, a 550-car drive-in that had opened on May 19, 1949, closed in 1989. The operators called the decision purely economic, and the site was redeveloped into an outlet mall.

Three historic downtown buildings were lost during the 1990s. The former Lynn Hotel, which opened in 1883, collapsed from neglect on July 8, 1991, after the city had bought it for $35,000 with hopes of converting it to offices. The 1910 Shields High School building was razed in 1997 after a botched partial demolition left it unsafe. On Christmas Day 1998, the 1854 building previously known as the Rader House—later the Walton—burned in an accidental fire that killed one person while it was being restored for low-income housing.

=== 21st century ===
With support from then–Lieutenant Governor John Mutz and the Jackson County Industrial Development Corporation, the automotive-parts manufacturer Aisin built a plant in Seymour in 1986 and began production in 1989. Early estimates suggested that about 200 jobs would be created. By 2020 the plant employed more than 2,000 people and supplied components to Honda, General Motors, Mitsubishi, Nissan, and Toyota. The announcement was welcomed locally. Residents interviewed by The Tribune cited the prospect of more jobs, and Seymour principal Gary Gilbert called it the result of "a lot of people work[ing] long and hard to bring industry to Seymour".

The 106-mile (171 km) north–south rail line through Seymour was bought by the Louisville and Indiana Railroad from Conrail in 1994 and operates as a short line connecting to the CSX east–west route, which CSX upgraded in 2016 for higher-speed operation.

On June 8, 2008, the East Fork of the White River crested at 20.92 feet near Seymour—an inch below the record set in the Great Flood of 1913—after a flood wave moved downstream from the Columbus area. Floodwaters covered thousands of acres of farmland, washed out roads and railroads, and flooded or threatened numerous homes in the Seymour, Brownstown, and Medora areas, with damage in the millions of dollars. There are no flood-control reservoirs upstream of Seymour.

Beginning around 1989, Seymour drew immigrants from San Sebastián Coatán in highland Guatemala, many of them members of the indigenous Chuj people. As word of work in the city reached relatives and neighbors in their hometown, chain migration followed, and by 2020 residents of Guatemalan origin made up more than 10 percent of the city's population.

In November 2019, the city unveiled a mural of John Mellencamp on the side of a local guitar store. The mural was painted by Indianapolis muralist Pamela Bliss and depicts Mellencamp at two stages of his life alongside the lyric "I was born in a small town". The Mellencamp family donated $50,000 to convert the adjacent lot into a green space. The space was dedicated in June 2021.

In 2022, Seymour accepted an invitation from the Indiana Economic Development Corporation to develop a long-term economic development strategy in partnership with the Brookings Institution and the Local Initiatives Support Corporation. The resulting plan, the Burkart Opportunity Zone Agenda, was unveiled in September 2023. Its proposals included workforce training, expanded housing, new recreational facilities, and an immigrant welcome and resource center.

The agenda drew organized public opposition centered on the proposed welcome center, which critics contended would attract illegal immigration and make Seymour a de facto sanctuary city. At a city council meeting on March 25, 2024, residents filled the council chambers and lined the streets outside city hall, and the council passed a resolution opposing the agenda by a 5–1 vote. That May, the council asked Mayor Matt Nicholson to develop a replacement economic agenda with no connection to the Brookings Institution. At the same meeting, residents submitted petitions calling for Nicholson's resignation, which the city attorney said had no legal effect under Indiana law.

In October 2024, Indiana Attorney General Todd Rokita issued a civil investigative demand to the Seymour Police Department to determine whether its immigration-related policies complied with a state statute, effective July 1, 2024, that bars local governments from restricting cooperation with federal immigration enforcement. Seymour was the first majority-Republican municipality to be investigated. City Attorney Christina Engleking responded that the police department and its officers were committed to fulfilling their duties and oaths of office.

The civil investigative demand followed a period of rapid demographic change. Census Bureau data showed the city's Hispanic or Latino population rose over the preceding two decades, while the overall population grew by about 3,000. On the day the demand was announced, Mayor Matt Nicholson canceled a scheduled city council meeting and council member Drew Storey held an informal community meeting on residents' concerns about the city's growth. State Representative Jim Lucas, said the pace of growth was outstripping the community's capacity to manage it.

In early March 2026, heavy rainstorms across central and southern Indiana pushed the East Fork of the White River into moderate flooding, with the Seymour gauge cresting 19.5 feet (5.9 m) against a flood stage of 12 feet (3.7 m). The National Weather Service reported that roughly seventy percent of the flood plain in Jackson County was underwater. One man drowned and his body was recovered two days later following a search by the Indiana Department of Natural Resources.

== Geography ==
According to the 2010 census, Seymour has a total area of 11.425 square miles (29.59 km^{2}), of which 11.42 square miles (29.58 km^{2}) (or 99.96%) is land and 0.005 square miles (0.01 km^{2}) (or 0.04%) is water.

=== Topography ===
Seymour lies in the Scottsburg Lowland physiographic region of Southern Indiana, a broad, low-relief plain that separates the Norman Upland to the west from the Muscatatuck Regional Slope to the east. The lowland is characterized by relatively flat terrain, contrasting with the rugged hills of the nearby Norman Upland and Knobstone Escarpment. It is underlain by older, easily eroded shales, which have weathered into a subdued landscape distinct from the surrounding uplands and escarpments. The city sits at an elevation of approximately 600 feet (180 m) above sea level.

The local topography is dominated by the East Fork of the White River which flows slowly through a heavily silted, meandering floodplain along the northern edge of the city. The river's low gradient and the surrounding low-lying swamplands make the area prone to frequent flooding. It averages 19 days above flood stage per year, with at least three major floods recorded since 1900.

The soils of the lowland are generally sandy but productive, supporting both row-crop agriculture and livestock. Historically, much of the surrounding land consisted of wetlands and wet prairie that were drained through ditching and tiling in the late nineteenth and early twentieth centuries to create arable farmland.

=== Climate ===
Seymour experiences a humid subtropical climate (Köppen classification "Cfa") characterized by high temperatures and evenly distributed precipitation throughout the year. Summers are influenced by moist maritime airflow, leading to warm nights and convectional thunderstorms, with tropical cyclones enhancing rainfall in some regions. Winters are mild, with frosts not uncommon and precipitation primarily from frontal cyclones. The average annual temperature is 55.0 °F (12.8 °C), with July being the warmest month at 77.0 °F (25 °C) and January the coolest at 32.0 °F (0 °C). The highest recorded temperature is 113.0 °F (45 °C) in July, and the lowest is -22.0 °F (-30 °C) in January. Seymour receives an average annual precipitation of 41.9 inches (1064.3 mm), with March being the wettest month and October the driest. The area averages 16.9 inches of snow annually, with January having the most snowfall.

Climate data for Seymour, Indiana, 1981–2010 normals, extremes 1893–present
Month	Jan	Feb	Mar	Apr	May	Jun	Jul	Aug	Sep	Oct	Nov	Dec	Year
Record high °F (°C)	78 (26)	80 (27)	88 (31)	95 (35)	101 (38)	111 (44)	113 (45)	111 (44)	106 (41)	95 (35)	86 (30)	74 (23)	113 (45)
Mean daily maximum °F (°C)	41 (5)	44 (7)	54 (12)	66 (19)	76 (24)	85 (29)	89 (32)	88 (31)	82 (28)	70 (21)	55 (13)	43 (6)	66 (19)
Daily mean °F (°C)	32 (0)	34 (1)	43 (6)	54 (12)	64 (18)	73 (23)	77 (25)	75 (24)	69 (21)	57 (14)	44 (7)	34 (1)	55 (13)
Mean daily minimum °F (°C)	23 (−5)	24 (−4)	33 (1)	43 (6)	52 (11)	61 (16)	65 (18)	63 (17)	56 (13)	44 (7)	34 (1)	25 (−4)	44 (7)
Record low °F (°C)	−22 (−30)	−21 (−29)	−8 (−22)	12 (−11)	29 (−2)	35 (2)	41 (5)	40 (4)	25 (−4)	16 (−9)	−2 (−19)	−18 (−28)	−22 (−30)
Average precipitation inches (mm)	3.8 (97)	3.0 (76)	4.1 (100)	3.7 (94)	4.1 (100)	4.1 (100)	3.4 (86)	3.3 (84)	3.3 (84)	2.8 (71)	3.2 (81)	3.1 (79)	41.9 (1,060)
Average snowfall inches (cm)	5.3 (13)	4.1 (10)	2.8 (7.1)	0.2 (0.51)	0.0 (0.0)	0.0 (0.0)	0.0 (0.0)	0.0 (0.0)	0.0 (0.0)	0.1 (0.25)	0.9 (2.3)	3.5 (8.9)	16.9 (43)
Average precipitation days	7.2	6.2	6.9	6.6	6.8	6.9	6.0	6.0	5.4	4.8	5.2	6.4	74.4
Average relative humidity (%)	77	74	70	66	72	70	67	71	74	69	73	76	72
Average dew point °F (°C)	24 (−4)	28 (−2)	37 (3)	41 (5)	54 (12)	63 (17)	63 (17)	63 (17)	57 (14)	44 (7)	35 (2)	22 (−6)	44 (7)
Source: WeatherBase

== Demographics ==
Historical population
Census	Pop.	Note	%±
1860	966		—
1870	2,372		145.5%
1880	4,250		79.2%
1890	5,337		25.6%
1900	6,445		20.8%
1910	6,305		−2.2%
1920	7,348		16.5%
1930	7,508		2.2%
1940	8,620		14.8%
1950	9,629		11.7%
1960	11,629		20.8%
1970	13,352		14.8%
1980	15,050		12.7%
1990	15,576		3.5%
2000	18,101		16.2%
2010	17,503		−3.3%
2020	21,569		23.2%
Source: US Census Bureau

=== 2020 census ===
As of the 2020 census, Seymour had a population of 21,569. The median age was 34.2 years. 27.3% of residents were under the age of 18 and 14.3% were 65 years of age or older. For every 100 females there were 99.1 males, and for every 100 females age 18 and over there were 96.6 males age 18 and over.

99.8% of residents lived in urban areas, while 0.2% lived in rural areas.

There were 8,144 households in Seymour, of which 34.8% had children under the age of 18 living in them. Of all households, 40.6% were married-couple households, 21.2% were households with a male householder and no spouse or partner present, and 29.2% were households with a female householder and no spouse or partner present. About 29.5% of all households were made up of individuals and 11.5% had someone living alone who was 65 years of age or older.

There were 8,679 housing units, of which 6.2% were vacant. The homeowner vacancy rate was 1.6% and the rental vacancy rate was 5.2%.

Racial composition as of the 2020 census
Race	Number	Percent
White	15,320	71.0%
Black or African American	412	1.9%
American Indian and Alaska Native	424	2.0%
Asian	350	1.6%
Native Hawaiian and Other Pacific Islander	6	0.0%
Some other race	2,681	12.4%
Two or more races	2,376	11.0%
Hispanic or Latino (of any race)	5,508	25.5%

=== Other demographic information ===
Seymour's population was 26% Hispanic in 2020, compared with 5% in 2000 and less than 1% in 1990, according to Census Bureau data. New immigration cases filed for people in Jackson County—a proxy for migrant arrivals—jumped to 435 in the fiscal year ended in September, from 66 in 2021, according to the Transactional Records Access Clearinghouse at Syracuse University.

The median household income in the city was $47,949 compared to the median household income of $62,743 in the State of Indiana. 39% of the population was employed in manufacturing or production and 17.4% of the population was involved in the education or healthcare industry.

The 2021 American Community Survey estimated that 7% of the population were veterans.

=== 2010 census ===
As of the census of 2010, there were 17,503 people, 6,907 households, and 4,514 families living in the city. The population density was 1,532.7 inhabitants per square mile (591.8/km^{2}). There were 7,719 housing units at an average density of 675.9 per square mile (261.0/km^{2}). The racial makeup of the city was 90.3% White, 1.3% African American, 0.2% Native American, 1.2% Asian, 0.1% Pacific Islander, 5.1% from other races, and 1.8% from two or more races. Hispanic or Latino people of any race were 11.5% of the population.

There were 6,907 households, of which 34.4% had children under the age of 18 living with them, 45.3% were married couples living together, 13.5% had a female householder with no husband present, 6.5% had a male householder with no wife present, and 34.6% were non-families. 28.1% of all households were made up of individuals, and 9.8% had someone living alone who was 65 years of age or older. The average household size was 2.49 and the average family size was 3.01.

The median age in the city was 35.5 years. 25.3% of residents were under the age of 18; 8.7% were between the ages of 18 and 24; 28.6% were from 25 to 44; 24% were from 45 to 64; and 13.4% were 65 years of age or older. The gender makeup of the city was 48.7% male and 51.3% female.

=== 2000 census ===
As of the census of 2000, there were 18,101 people, 7,231 households, and 4,743 families living in the city. The population density was 1,670.3 inhabitants per square mile (644.9/km^{2}). There were 7,709 housing units at an average density of 711.4 per square mile (274.7/km^{2}). The racial makeup of the city was 93.4% White, 1.0% African American, 0.3% Native American, 1.4% Asian, 0.1% Pacific Islander, 2.9% from other races, and 0.9% from two or more races. Hispanic or Latino people of any race were 4.9% of the population.

There were 7,231 households, out of which 32.6% had children under the age of 18 living with them, 49.4% were married couples living together, 11.5% had a female householder with no husband present, and 34.4% were non-families. 28.5% of all households were made up of individuals, and 11.6% had someone living alone who was 65 years of age or older. The average household size was 2.46 and the average family size was 2.99.

In the city, the population was spread out, with 25.5% under the age of 18, 10.2% from 18 to 24, 31.4% from 25 to 44, 19.4% from 45 to 64, and 13.5% who were 65 years of age or older. The median age was 34 years. For every 100 females, there were 95.7 males. For every 100 females aged 18 and over, there were 93.0 males.

The median income for a household in the city was $36,883, and the median income for a family was $43,357. Males had a median income of $30,638 versus $22,265 for females. The per capita income for the city was $18,222. About 8.0% of families and 10.0% of the population were below the poverty line, including 9.7% of those under age 18 and 11.6% of those age 65 or over.

== Economy ==
The economy of Seymour is based primarily on manufacturing and distribution, healthcare, and education. Jackson County's unemployment rate was 3.3% in October, compared with 4.4% statewide. Median household income in Seymour was $63,000 and the homeownership rate 57% in 2023, both below statewide averages.

Major manufacturers include automotive component manufacturing company Aisin USA, Cummins, Valeo North America, the Lannett Company, and Silgas Plastics. Nippon Steel Pipe America, an automotive parts supplier, employs over 400 associates at its plant in Seymour.

In April 2026, the Seymour Common Council approved property-tax abatements supporting more than $164 million in new capital investment by five of the city's largest industrial employers—Valeo, Aisin USA, the Cummins Seymour Engine Plant, the Walmart Distribution Center, and SpaceGuard Products. The investments, largely in new manufacturing equipment and automation, were tied to the retention of more than 3,700 jobs, including 1,831 at Aisin's two Seymour plants, 957 at Cummins, and 937 at the Walmart Distribution Center.

Owing to the city's access to I-65 and US-50, Walmart Transportation and Pet Supplies Plus have large operations based in Seymour. Walmart Distribution is the primary provider of merchandise for all Wal-Mart retail units. The Walmart Distribution Center is fully mechanized and multi-shift operated with receiving, order filling, and shipping departments.

Schneck Medical Center employs more than 1,100 people, including 200 physicians and 400 volunteers, and has operated for over 100 years. The Seymour Community Schools and Rose Acre Farms are also major employers.

Other employers include retail and service industry providers, such as franchise and locally owned restaurants that line US-50.

== Arts and culture ==
The Actors Community Theatre of Seymour (ACTS) is a non-profit organization founded in 2013. Its first production was in March 2014. ACTS is dedicated to the propagation and preservation of the theatrical arts in the area and has an ongoing schedule of theatrical performances.

The Southern Indiana Center for the Arts (SICA) is a not-for-profit organization operated by a volunteer board of directors and an executive director. It has been owned by the Mellencamp family since 1991 and provides art education and helps draw attention to Jackson County as an art-conscious region.

The 1992 film Falling from Grace, the directorial debut of Seymour native John Mellencamp, was filmed largely in and around Seymour during 1990. It premiered in the city at the Jackson Park Cinema in February 1992.

The Oktoberfest celebrates the city's German heritage and has been held annually since 1973. The first Oktoberfest was organized by the Seymour Chamber of Commerce and featured Bavarian music, carnival rides, food and exhibit booths, parades, a hot air balloon race, a baby contest, and a Biergarten.

Scoop the Loop is a local weekend car show that started in 2011 but can trace its origins back to the years following World War II. The rise of car culture, rock and roll, and teenagers with free time made cruising downtown popular in Seymour, with teens coming from eleven surrounding counties. Beginning in the 1980s, some local merchants alleged that illegal activity was occurring. Through the 1990s, absent any ordinance prohibiting the activity, the local government blocked off many downtown streets and popular parking lots. This effectively ended cruising in Seymour. Cruising was revived in 2011 by local enthusiasts who started an annual event held on one Saturday in August. Local merchants and restaurants now support the event as a way to draw customers back to the downtown area.

The H. Vance Swope Memorial Art Gallery was created at the bequest of the artist, who spent his youth in Seymour, and contains works by regional artists as well as an extensive collection of landscapes by Swope.

Local diners are a longstanding part of Seymour's culture. Larrison's Diner served as a filming location for Falling from Grace.

Until 2019, Seymour was the last town in the United States to celebrate Victory over Japan Day with a local parade. Beginning in 1946, the parade was held annually until the local VFW voted to discontinue the tradition.

Seymour is home to numerous social, service, and philanthropic organizations, including the Elks Lodge, the Jackson County Masonic Lodge, the Order of the Eastern Star, the Seymour Lions, the Rotary Club of Seymour, the Moose Lodge, Phi Beta Psi, the Knights of Columbus, and the Jackson County Sertoma Club.

At the 2026 CMA Awards held in Nashville TN, Seymour-born and raised artist Stephen Wilson Jr. was awarded Best New Artist Of The Year.

=== National Register of Historic Places ===
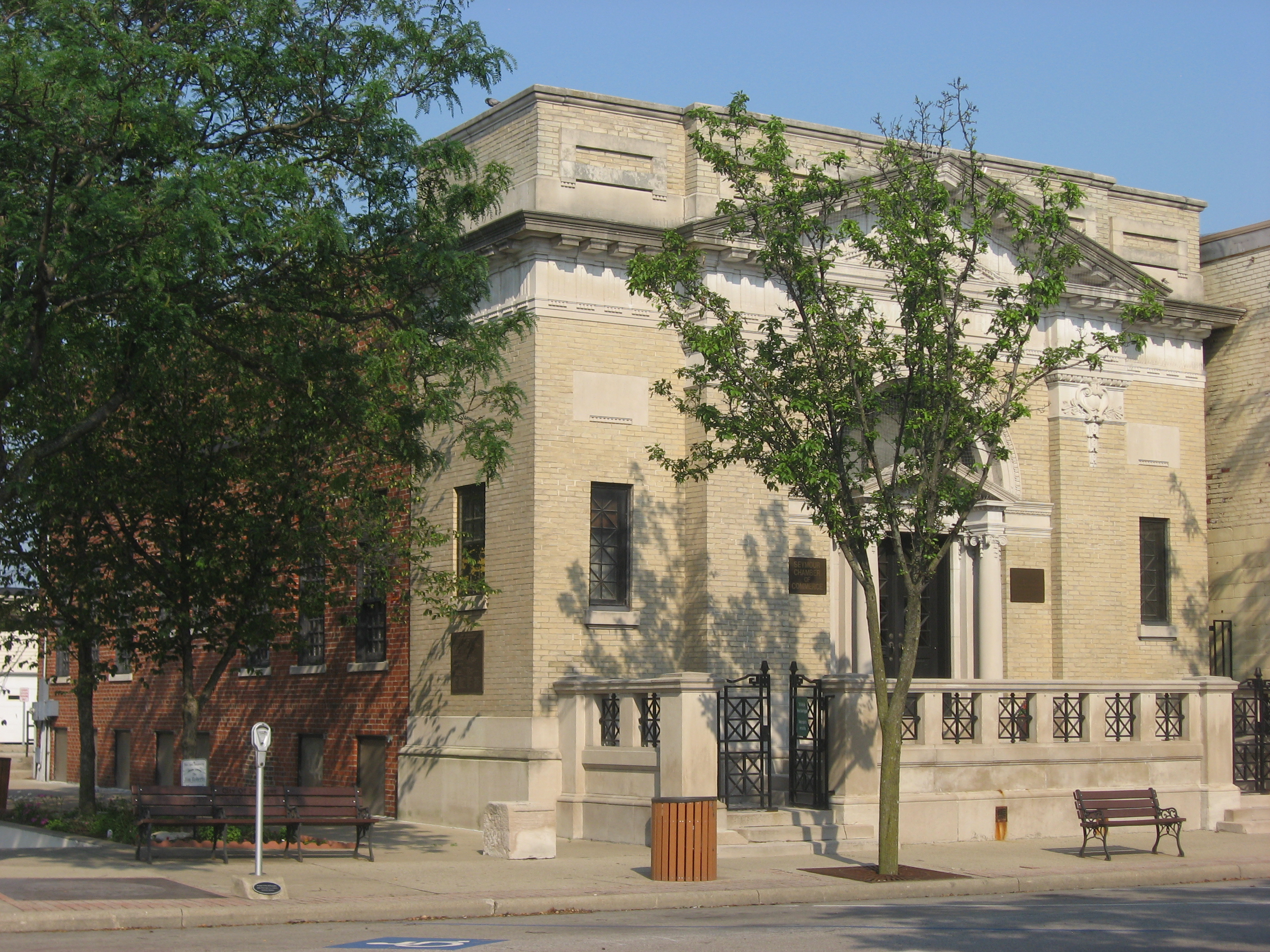
Farmers Club

The city is home to six structures listed on the National Register of Historic Places. The Farmers Club was built by the Blish family and donated to the city as a memorial to city founder Meedy Shields. It was included in the National Register in 1983. The building was constructed from Bedford limestone, brick, and steel. It was the only building of its kind in the Midwest at the time of construction. Meedy Shields Blish was inspired to provide a place for farmers to rest while they were bringing produce and grain to the city market. The building formally opened on October 8, 1914, and has been used as a club since then. The building also housed the Seymour Red Cross, the city of Seymour, the Seymour Police Department, and the Seymour Chamber of Commerce.

The First Presbyterian Church of Seymour was constructed in 1884. It is of Late Gothic Style architecture and includes stained glass by the Jacoby Art Glass Company. At the time of its construction, it was the tallest spire in the city. It was listed on the National Register of Historic Places in 1991.

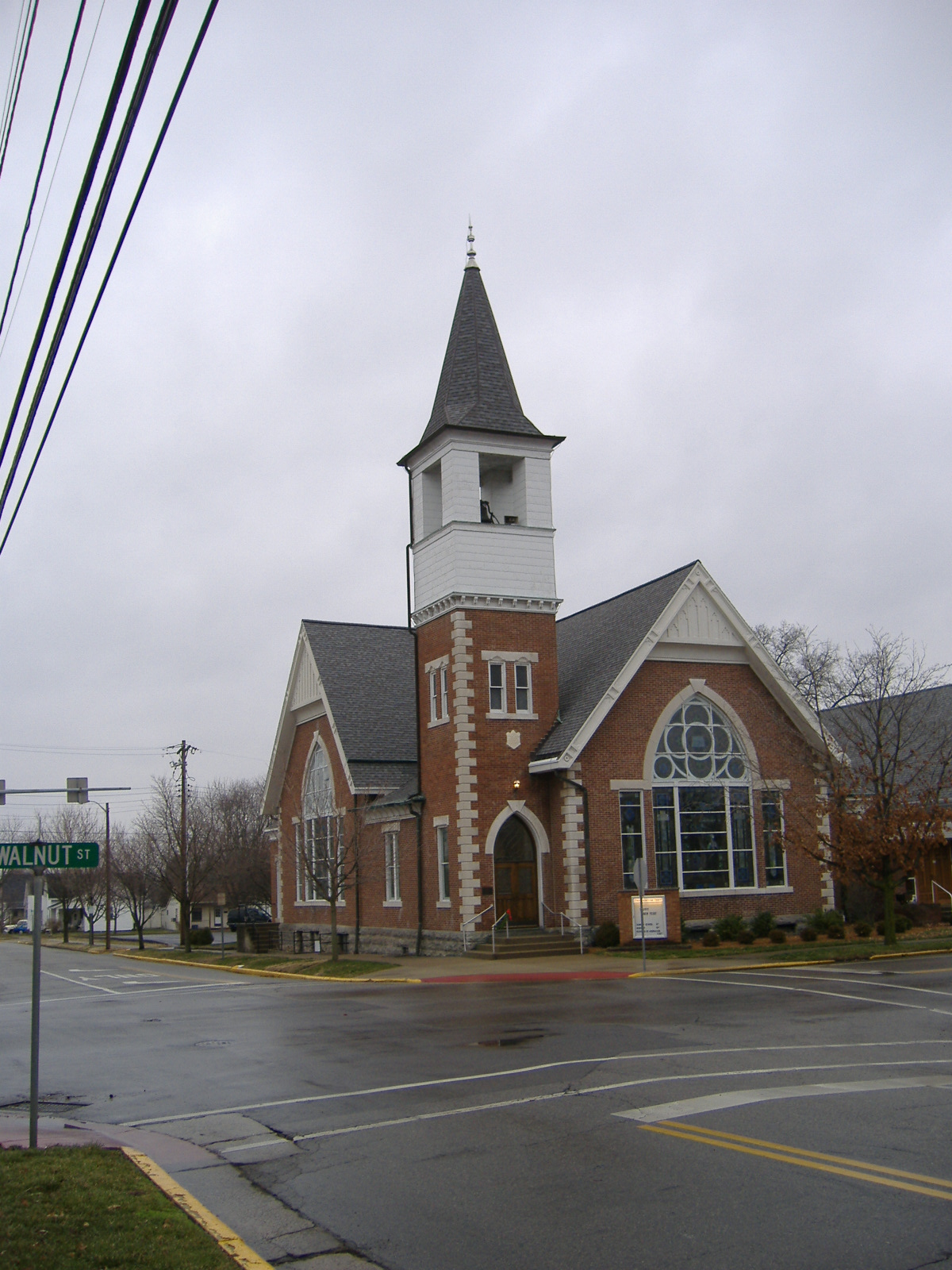
First Presbyterian Church

The T. Harlan and Helen Montgomery House is a grade five historic building of Dutch Colonial Revival design. It is located on North Poplar Street and was placed on the registry in 2010.

The Seymour Commercial Historic District consists of 79 contributing buildings and 4 contributing structures in the central business district of Seymour. The district developed between about 1876 and 1945 and includes notable examples of Italianate, Romanesque Revival, and Classical Revival style architecture. The entire district was placed on the register in 1995, although the Jonas Hotel later burned down and no longer exists.

The Southern Indiana Railroad Freighthouse, has served as the Jackson County Visitor Center for Jackson County, Indiana, since January 2008. The freight house was placed on the National Register of Historic Places on June 22, 2003.

George H. Vehslage House is a historic home located on Chestnut Street. It was built in 1894 and is a 2-and-one-half-story, Queen Anne style brick dwelling with a limestone foundation. It was placed on the registry in 2010.

=== Other significant buildings ===
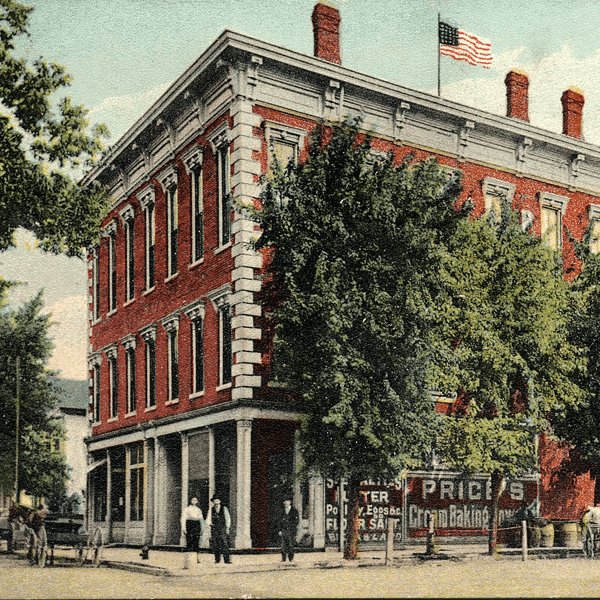
The Odd Fellows Building

714 W Fifth Street is the childhood home of John Mellencamp. This ranch-style house was built in 1949. It has been privately owned since 1979 and there are plans to remodel the property and rent it on AirBnB.

The Travis Carter house was built in 1852. It is located on Indianapolis Avenue and is the oldest building still standing in Seymour. Today, it is privately owned, but it once housed the offices of the local Red Cross.

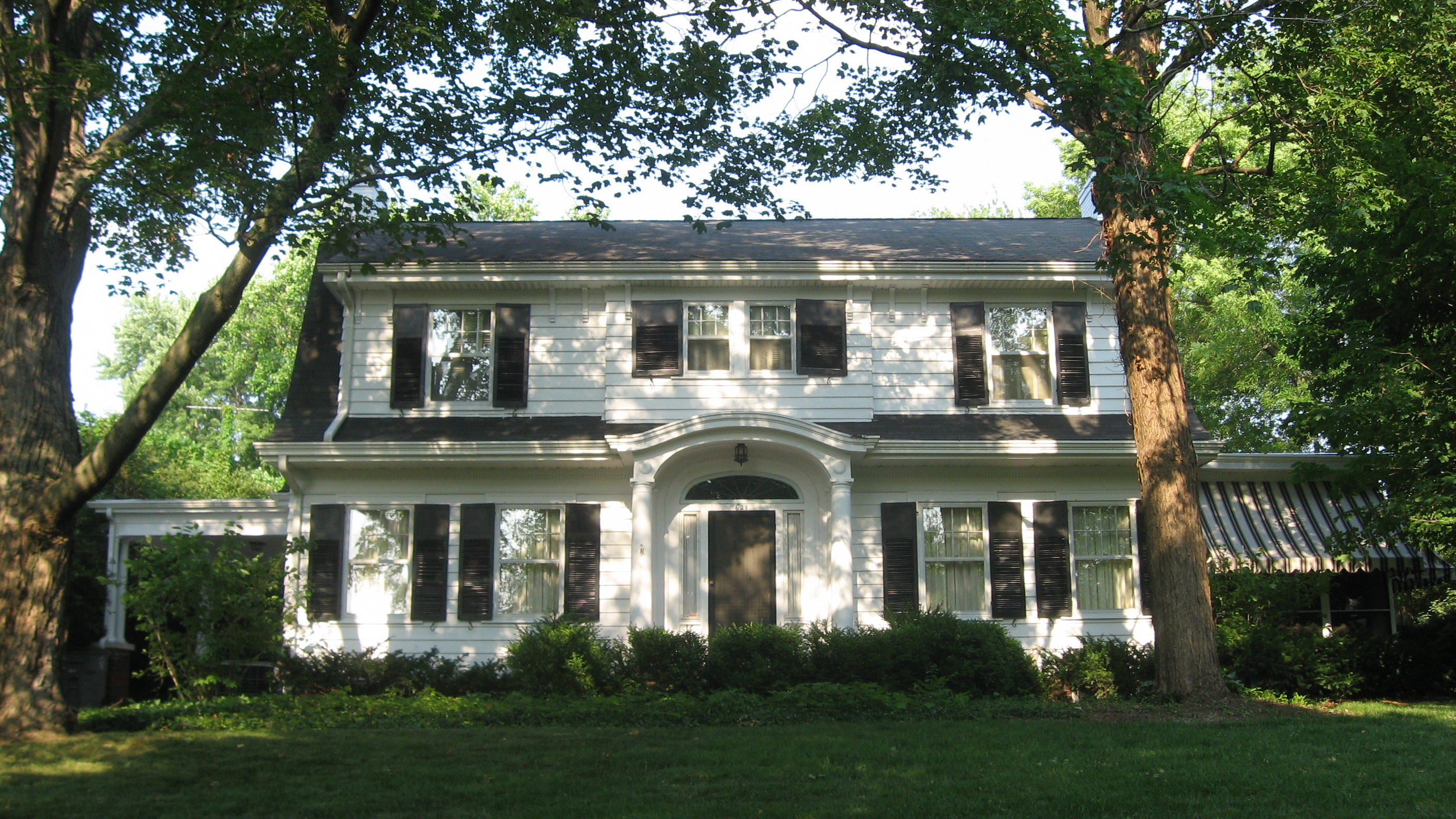
T. Harlan and Helen Montgomery House

The former Blish Mill grain towers are the tallest structures in town. They operated from 1858 to 1976.

The Federal Building was built in 1915. It served for many years as the post office, and then as offices for the Seymour Police Department. Today, it is being restored as the Seymour Museum Center.

The former James Shields Memorial Gym is one of Indiana's most endangered landmarks. It was one of Indiana's largest high school gymnasiums when it was built by Works Progress Administration workers in 1941. The gym hosts 21 sectional titles from 1942 to 1970. A local family purchased the vacant property in 1996, and later demolished the high school nearby. As of 2023, the gym remains empty and is the target of vandalism. Roof leaks have led to water damage, though an architectural assessment showed the steel and concrete gym to be structurally sound.

=== Library ===
Seymour Public Library is a branch of the Jackson County Public Library.

== Parks and recreation ==
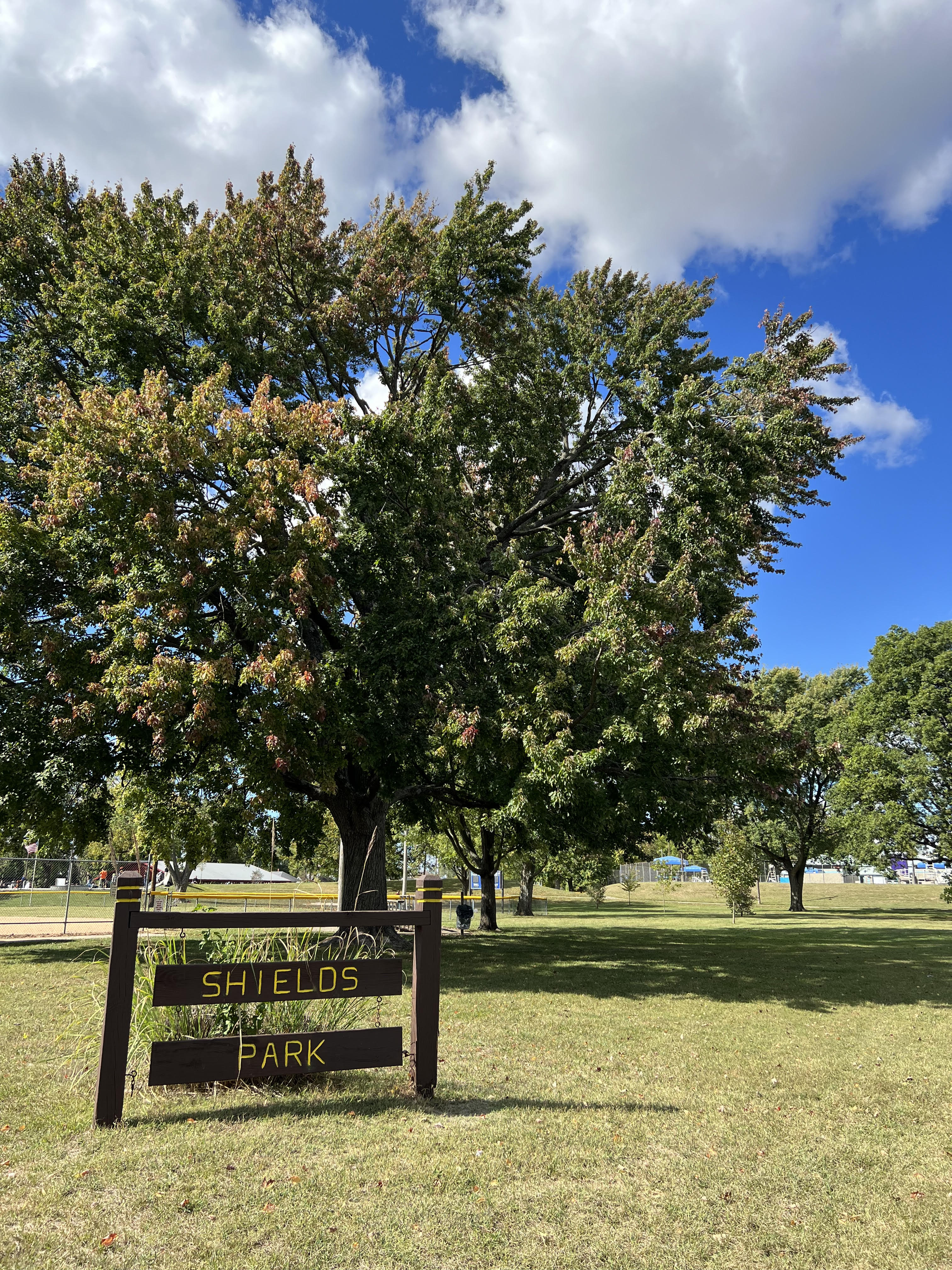
Shields Park, ca 2023

Seymour's recreation department operates five parks.

Shields Park is the city's oldest public park and was formally known as City Park. The park is located on 12 acres of land at North Park Street. It includes a skate park and a public pool.

In 1924, Anna M. Gaiser donated the site of her father's plant nursery to be Gaiser Park.

Kessler Park was donated by the Kessler family in 1978.

The department operates 3 plazas. Mellencamp Plaza and a recreation field located near Freeman Field were completed in 2019.

Burkhart Plaza is a music-themed plaza. It is named for the longtime mayor John Burkhart, who died in 2019. The park was dedicated in July 2020. It connects downtown with Crossroads Community Park.

Crossroads Community park displays the 16.5-ton iron Blish Mill flywheel across from the surviving grain silos.

The recreation department also provides a memorial tree and bench program to honor deceased residents as well as 14 miles of bike and walking trails.

== Government ==
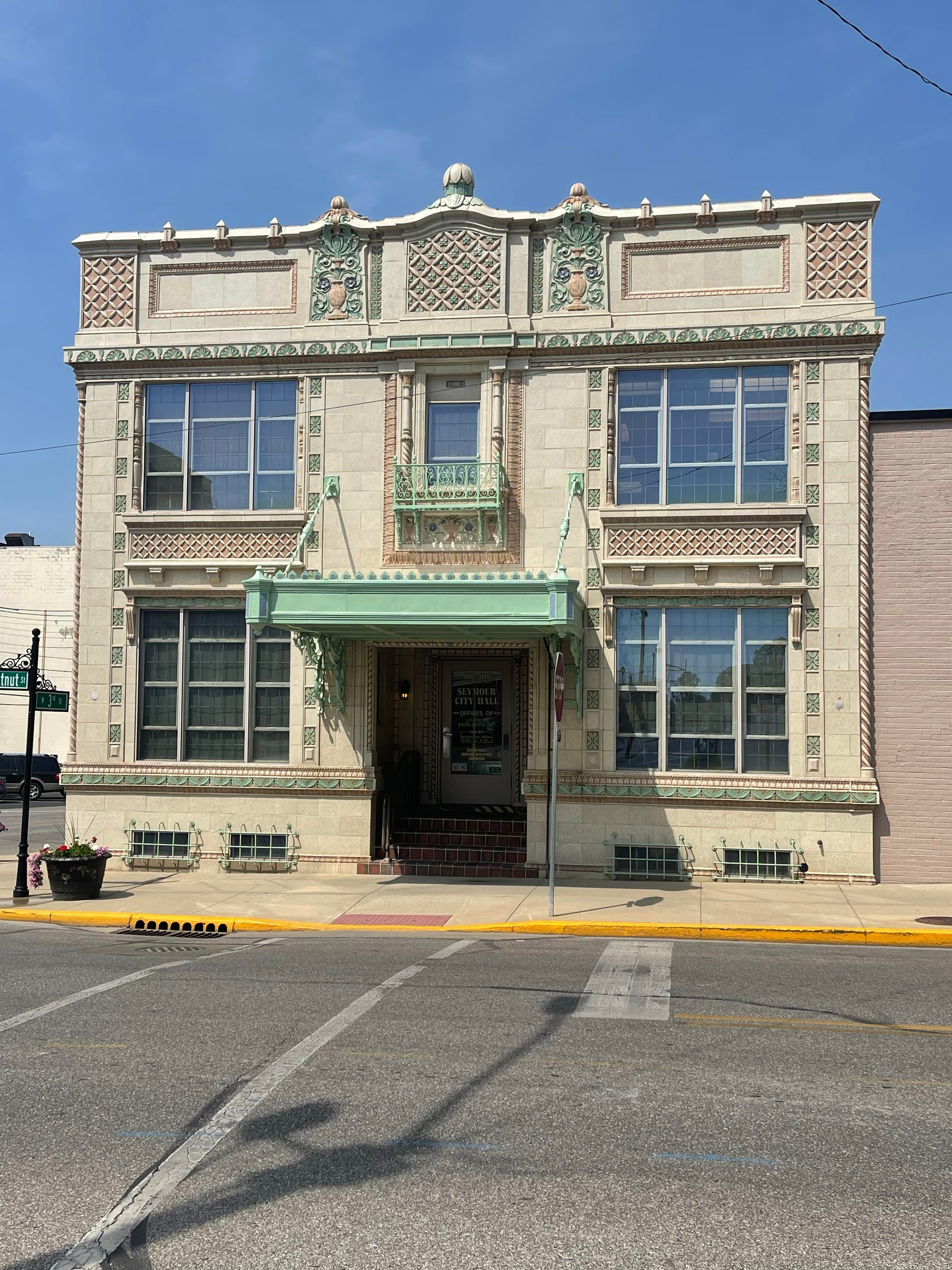
City Hall, ca 2023

Mayors are elected by city-wide election every four years from qualified candidates who are residents of the city. The first mayor of the city was Captain George Greene, a native of Kentucky, a veteran of the Mexican-American War, and a close ally of Meedy Shields. The City Hall has operated out of the former Southern Indiana Telephone and Telegraph Company since 1985.

In 2019, a local businessman and former city councilman Matthew Nicholson was elected to his first term as mayor. He won the election with 1,963 (59.3%) votes versus challenger Rexanne Ude who received 1,350 (40%) votes. In addition to his official duties, Nicholson has joined the board of directors for Main Street Seymour, Indiana and regularly contributes to the local newspaper.

The seven-member city council is the legislative body for the city and has the exclusive responsibility of passing or changing local laws, resolutions, orders, and motions for the city's government. As the fiscal body, the council has the authority to levy certain taxes and it has the sole responsibility of adopting a city budget each year. The council also appoints members to certain boards and commissions that serve the community in various areas.

A chronological list of mayors of the city of Seymour includes:

- George Green (D), 1865 - 1867
- Alexander A Davison (D) 1867 - 1869
- Thomas Whitson, 1869 - 1870
- Albert P. Charles (R), 1870 - 1872
- Samuel W. Holmes, 1872 - 1874
- Albert P. Charles (R), 1874 - 1878
- Daniel W. Johnson, 1878 - 1884
- Reuben Everhart, 1884 - 1886
- A.J. Frazer, 1886 - 1888
- Daniel W. Johnson, 1888 - 1890
- Frank Bennett, 1890 - 1892
- Philip Laugel, 1892 - 1894
- Joseph Basley, 1894 - 1898
- Alfred W. Mills, 1898 - 1902
- Dr. J. M. Shields, 1902 - 1904
- Dr. George G. Graessle (R), 1904 - 1906
- Dr. Henry R. Kyte, 1906 - 1910
- Allen Swope (D), 1910 - 1914
- John A Ross, 1914 - 1918
- Charles W. Burkart (D), 1918 - 1922
- Charles L. Kessler, 1922 - 1926
- Charles E. Miles, 1926 - 1929 (Note: Charles E. Miles died while in office.)
- Frank W. Abele, 1929 (12 days)
- Charles W. Burkart (D), 1929 - 1939
- Stanley Switzer (R), 1939 - 1942
- Charles W. Burkart (D), 1943 - 1947
- Donald L. Heiwig (R), 1948 - 1955
- John C. Isaacs (D), 1956 - 1963
- James L. Laupus (R), 1964 - 1971
- Christopher D. Moritz (D), 1972 - 1975
- Donald H. Ernest (R), 1976 - 1979
- Christopher D. Moritz (D), 1980 - 1983
- Donald F. Scott (D), 1983 (Note: Mr. Scott served for 42 days to fill a vacancy left by the resignation of Christopher Moritz until the mayor-elect could be sworn in.)
- William W. Bailey (D), 1983 - 1990
- John S. Burkhart (D), 1990 - 2003
- James E. Bullard (D), 2004 - 2007
- Craig Luedeman (R), 2008 - 2019
- Matthew Nicholson (R), 2019 - incumbent

=== Election results ===
Over the past two decades, Jackson County, Indiana, has consistently maintained a majority vote for Republican presidential candidates. Democratic candidates have garnered significant but lesser support, with Libertarian candidates receiving the smallest percentage of votes.

In Jackson County, the results for the 2024 presidential election show that Republican Donald J. Trump received 14,430 votes (76.69%), followed by Kamala D. Harris with 4,035 votes (21.44%). Independent candidate Chase Oliver received 109 votes (0.58%), while Robert F. Kennedy Jr. garnered 209 votes (1.11%). There were also 34 write-in votes (0.18%).

In the 2020 election, President Donald Trump received 14,555 votes in Jackson County, accounting for 75% of the total votes. In contrast, Vice President Joe Biden garnered 4,302 votes, which represented 23% of the total votes.

In the 2016 election in Jackson County, Donald Trump won with 12,857 votes, accounting for 73.3% of the total votes. Hillary Clinton received 3,843 votes, which represented 21.9% of the total. Libertarian candidate Gary Johnson garnered 832 votes, making up 4.7% of the total votes.

In the 2012 election in Jackson County, Republican candidate Mitt Romney won with 10,419 votes, accounting for 62.4% of the total votes. Incumbent President Barack Obama received 5,838 votes, which represented 34.9% of the total. Libertarian candidate Gary Johnson garnered 447 votes, making up 2.7% of the total votes.

In the 2008 election in Jackson County Republican John McCain won with 9,726 votes, accounting for 55.77% of the total votes. Democratic challenger Barack Obama received 7,354 votes, which represented 42.17% of the total. Libertarian candidates Bob Barr garnered 289 votes, making up 1.66% of the total votes. There were also 66 write-in votes (0.38%) and 5 votes for other candidates (0.03%).

In the 2004 election in Jackson County, Republican George W. Bush won with 11,083 votes, accounting for 67.96% of the total votes. While Democrat John Kerry received 5,092 votes, which represented 31.22% of the total. Libertarian candidates Michael Badnarik and garnered 112 votes, making up 0.69% of the total votes. There were also 22 write-in votes (0.13%).

== Education ==
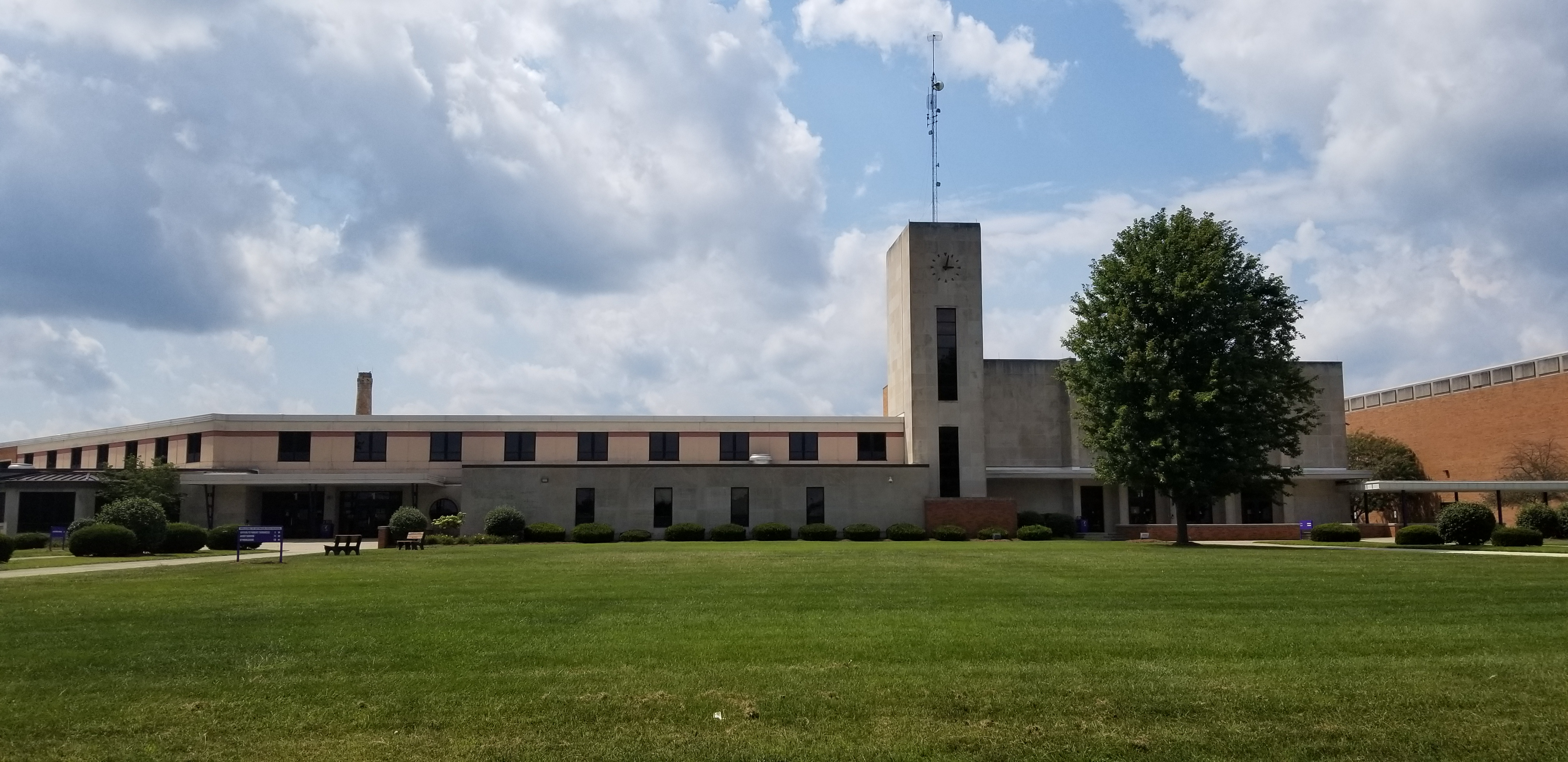
Seymour High School

Seymour Community Schools operates Seymour High School and eight other elementary and secondary schools in the city. The current system-wide school enrollment exceeds 5,000 students. The local schools employ 650 people and are managed by a public board consisting of seven members of the community. The current board president is Art Juergens, a retired social studies teacher and coach. Three hundred forty-two students graduated in the class of 2023.

Trinity Lutheran High School is a private educational institution for grades 9–12 that first opened in 2000 on a newly donated 41-acre campus. The school is owned and operated by the South Central Lutheran Association for Secondary Education, Inc., an association of 14 Lutheran congregations in Scott, Jennings, Bartholomew, and Jackson Counties. The school is accredited and in good standing by the National Lutheran School Accreditation (NLSA) organization of the Lutheran Church-Missouri Synod, Cognia, and also recognized as an accredited school by the Indiana Department of Education. Twenty-seven seniors graduated from TLHS's 19th class in May 2023.

The Immanuel Lutheran School provides private K-8 education and is fully accredited through the State of Indiana and the Lutheran Church Missouri-Synod. In addition to the core curriculum, Immanuel's comprehensive education offers a fine arts program including music, band, art, and physical education. Students attending ILS have the option of enrolling in either Trinity Lutheran High School or Seymour High School to finish their secondary education.

The St. Ambrose Catholic School is a private school associated with St. Ambrose Church of Seymour Indiana. The school is a member of the Archdiocese of Indianapolis. The current facility opened in 1958, but the Archdiocese has offered private Catholic educational services to the community since 1858. Enrollment is open for students K-8. The school is overseen by St. Ambrose School Commission, which is an advisory committee that works with the school principal and the pastor. The school provides services in both English and Spanish. The school is fully accredited by the State of Indiana and nationally through Cognia.

== Media ==
=== Radio ===
- WLCL: 93.9 FM
- WXKU: 92.7 FM
- WZZB: 1390 AM and 99.3 FM
- WJAA: 96.3 FM
- W252BY: 98.3 FM is a 100-watt repeater for WHUM-LP
- WJCP: 97.7 FM and 1460 AM
- WJLR: 91.5 FM (K-Love)

=== Print ===
- The Seymour Tribune is a newspaper published in a traditional print edition three times per week and online Monday through Saturday.
- Jackson County Banner is a semi-weekly publication from nearby Brownstown, Indiana.

== Infrastructure ==
=== Transportation ===
==== Airport ====
The Freeman Municipal Airport is a public-use airport owned by the Seymour Airport Authority. It was established in 1942 by the United States Army Air Forces and was the first USAAF helicopter training school. It also trained black aviators, including Tuskegee Airmen. The airport played a significant role in the civil rights movement, with the Freeman Field mutiny in 1945. After World War II, it became a storage depot for captured German and Italian aircraft.

The airport covers 2,100 acres and has four runways. It handles general aviation, air taxi, and military operations.

==== Railroads ====
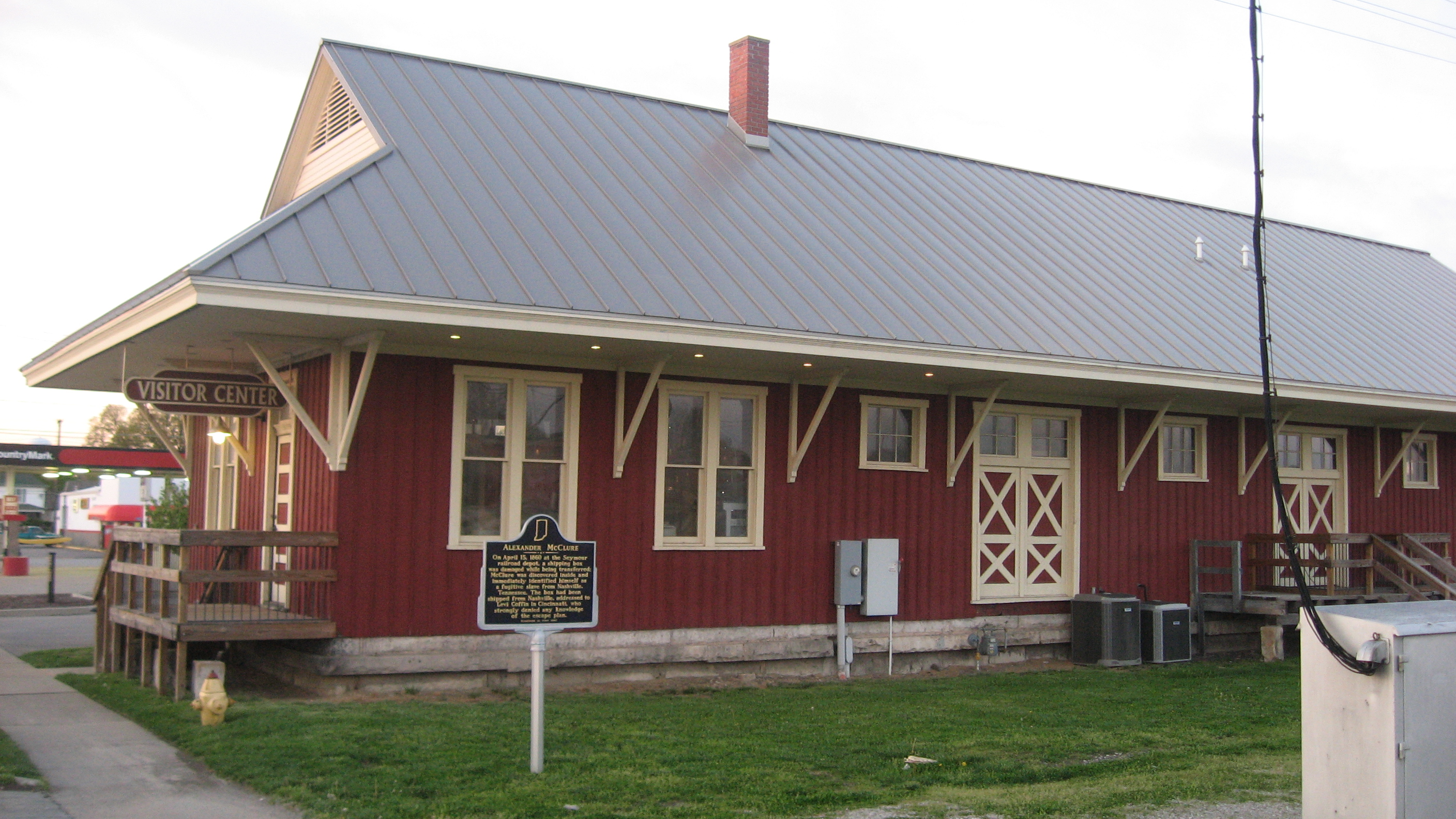
The Southern Indiana Railroad Freighthouse in Seymour is listed on the National Register of Historic Places.

The Pennsylvania Railroad succeeded the Jeffersonville Railroad (built northward). A Chessie System caboose sits in front of the Blish Mill grain tower.

The Ohio and Mississippi Railway, built westward, was acquired by the Baltimore & Ohio Railroad in 1893. It has been operated by CSX since 1986.

The Evansville & Richmond Railroad (after 1910 the Chicago, Terre Haute & Southeastern Railroad (CTH&SE), or "the Milwaukee") was built eastward toward Richmond. It reached Seymour in 1890, and connected with New York Central in Westport. Tracks east of Seymour were "cut off" in 1961, and operations to Bedford closed in 1978.

The Interstate Public Service interurban lines reached Seymour from Columbus in October 1907. Interstate merged into Midland United Company, leased to Indiana Railway, and all trains south of Seymour stopped running to Louisville in September 1939. Operations continued north of Seymour to Indianapolis until a collision on September 8, 1941, that wrecked "the majority of the line's rolling stock".

Between 2020 and 2023, the city constructed the Burkart Boulevard South Bypass, a three-phase, approximately $30 million project extending Burkart Boulevard to connect the East Side Industrial Park with the Freeman Field industrial area to route truck traffic around downtown Seymour. Planning began after the Louisville and Indiana Railroad and CSX announced in 2014 a nearly $100 million upgrade of the rail line that bisects the city. The first phase, completed in October 2021 at a cost of $17.2 million, included more than two miles of new roadway, a bridge over the Louisville and Indiana Railroad, and a 12-foot-wide multi-use trail. About $6 million of the cost came from the Seymour Redevelopment Commission, with the remainder funded primarily through federal transportation grants administered by the Indiana Department of Transportation.

==== Interstates ====
- Interstate 65

==== US Highways ====
- U.S. Route 31
- U.S. Route 50

==== Indiana State Roads ====
- State Road 11
- State Road 258
- State Road 160
- State Road 250
- State Road 256

== Notable people ==
- J. Ottis Adams, impressionist painter, lived nearby
- Bill Bailey, former city councilman, mayor, and president of the local Chamber of Commerce
- H. Foster Bain, geologist and 4th director of the U.S. Bureau of Mines, born in Seymour
- Christopher Ryan Baker, professional golfer, born in Seymour and raised in Brownstown
- Danny "the Damaja" Basham, professional wrestler
- John Bell Blish, inventor of the "Blish Lock" component of the Thompson submachine gun
- Harold Bower, basketball player
- Jason B. Brown, U.S. congressman 1889–1895
- Pat Calhoun, swimmer, competed in the 2000 Summer Olympic Games
- Royce Campbell, jazz guitarist, composer, producer
- Hoagy Carmichael, jazz musician and frequent guest of the Blish family
- Larry Crane, musician
- Clessie Cummins, founder of Cummins, the Blish family's chauffeur
- Rolla Daringer, MLB shortstop
- John Dittmer, civil-rights historian, author, and DePauw University professor
- Tim Durham, Ponzi scheme operator convicted in 2012 of the largest white-collar crimes in Indiana history
- Scott Earl, retired MLB second baseman
- Frank K. Edmondson, astronomer
- Brian Fish, basketball coach, Montana State
- Daniel M. Fleetwood, scientist, inventor, engineer, and innovator
- Terry Goodin, former Indiana House of Representatives congressman
- George Green, songwriting partner of John Mellencamp
- Betty Grissom, wife of astronaut Gus Grissom, often stayed in the city with her sister
- Baron Hill, former Indiana 9th District U.S. representative
- Leroy Charles Hodapp, Methodist bishop
- Thomas M. Honan, speaker of the Indiana House of Representatives and Indiana attorney general
- George L. Knox II, Air Force fighter pilot
- Oren Ritter Lewis, jurist
- Jim Lucas, politician and businessman
- Margaret Read MacDonald, writer
- John Mellencamp, musician, singer-songwriter, painter, and actor
- Lisa Kennedy Montgomery, libertarian political commentator, radio personality and author
- Oscar H. Montgomery, justice of the Indiana Supreme Court
- Erica Moore, middle-distance runner
- Teri Moren, women's basketball head coach, Indiana University
- Carrie Nation, lived at the Steele Boarding house during one of her temperance tours
- Frank Niehaus, professional football player
- Pee Wee Reese, baseball player, played for the former Seymour Reds
- William Wilkinson Reno, U.S. Army officer and inventor of the hypodermic needle
- Rip Rogers, retired professional wrestler and trainer
- Colonel Harland Sanders, businessman and founder of Kentucky Fried Chicken; a frequent visitor with family in town, he was initiated into Seymour's Elks Lodge No. 462
- Meedy Shields, pioneer, town founder, landowner, and influential state senator
- Robert Shields, minister and teacher listed in the Guinness Book of World Records
- Katie Stam, 2008 Miss Indiana and Miss America 2009
- Steve Steinwedel, college basketball coach
- David Curtis Stephenson, Grand Dragon of the Indiana KKK, convicted rapist, and murderer; lived in Seymour after his 1956 release from prison
- Elbridge Blish Thompson, industrialist
- Gary Wagner, former MLB pitcher
- Edgar Whitcomb, 43rd governor of Indiana, maintained a law practice and a home in Seymour
- Rob Wiethoff, actor, John Marston in Red Dead Redemption and Red Dead Redemption 2
- Stephen Wilson Jr., country and rock singer, guitarist, and songwriter
- Anthony Winchester, college basketball coach
- Coleman Young, Air Force officer and participant in the mutiny at Freeman Field

== Notable groups and organizations ==
- The Elms, rock and roll band active between 2000 and 2010
- Reno Gang, committed the first peacetime train robbery in the United States in Seymour in 1866

== See also ==
- JayC Food Stores
