= German submarine U-20 =

U-20 may refer to one of the following German submarines:

- SM U-20 (Germany), was a Type U 19 submarine launched in 1912 and that served in the First World War until grounded on 4 November 1916; notable for sinking RMS Lusitania
  - During the First World War, Germany also had these submarines with similar names:
    - SM UB-20, a Type UB II submarine launched in 1915 and sunk 28 July 1917
    - SM UC-20, a Type UC II submarine launched in 1916 and surrendered on 16 January 1919
- German submarine U-20 (1936), a Type IIB submarine that served in the Second World War and was scuttled on 10 September 1944
- German submarine U-20 (S199), a Type 206 submarine of the Bundesmarine that was launched in 1974 and scrapped in 1996 and sold to Indonesia
