= Leroy Charles Hodapp =

Leroy Charles Hodapp (11 November 1923 – 26 May 2006) distinguished himself as a Methodist pastor, district superintendent, Annual Conference official, and bishop of the United Methodist Church (U.M.C.) who was elected in 1976.

== Birth and family ==
Bishop Hodapp was born in Seymour, Indiana, to Linden Charles and Mary Marguerite Miller Hodapp. Leroy Hodapp married Polly Anne Martin in June 1947; they have two daughters.

== Education ==
Leroy earned his B.A. degree from the University of Evansville (1944), and his Bachelor of Divinity degree from Drew Theological Seminary (1947). Bishop Hodapp also received several honorary doctorates.

== Ordained ministry ==
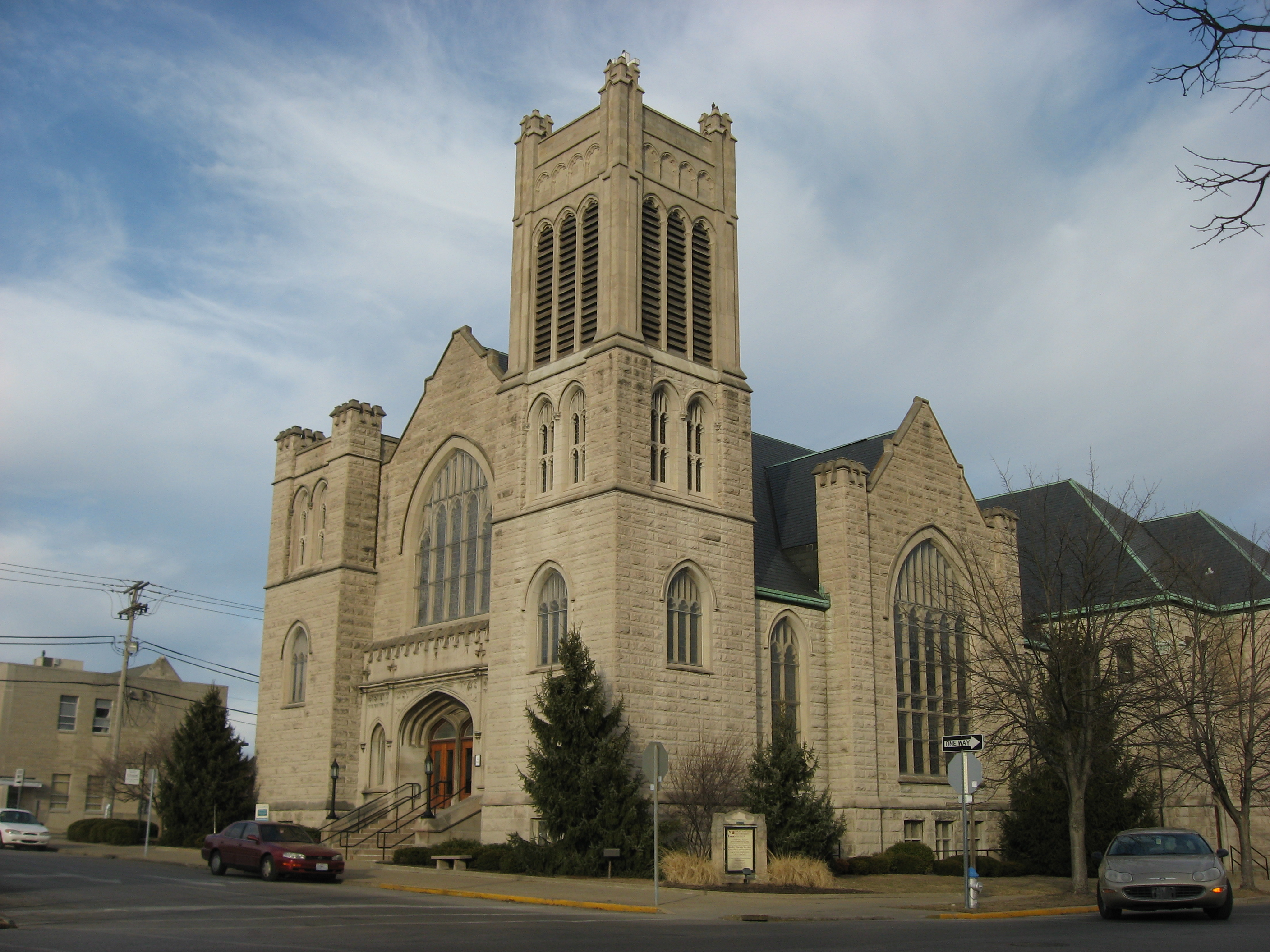
First Methodist Church in Bloomington

Leroy was ordained deacon in 1945 by Bishop Titus Lowe, joining the Indiana Annual Conference of The Methodist Church. Bishop Lowe ordained him elder the summer of 1947.

Rev. Hodapp served pastoral appointments at the Orleans, Indiana Methodist Church; the Heath Memorial and Meridian Street Methodist Churches in Indianapolis, Indiana, and the First Methodist Church in Bloomington, Indiana. Between 1965 and 1970, Rev. Hodapp served as the superintendent of the Bloomington District (1965–67), the Indianapolis West District (1967–68), and the Indianapolis Northeast District (1968–70). He then became director of the Conference Council of Ministries of the South Indiana Annual Conference of the U.M. Church.

Rev. Hodapp was a delegate to the North Central Jurisdictional Conference of The Methodist/United Methodist Church (1964–76), and to the General Conference of the same (1968–76). He held responsible positions in conference agencies, including chairperson of the Conference Board of Ordained Ministry. He was also a member of the Commission to Study the Superintendency during the 1972-76 quadrennium.

== Episcopal ministry ==
Leroy Hodapp was elected bishop by the 1976 North Central Jurisdictional Conference. He was assigned to the Illinois episcopal area (Central and South Illinois Annual Conferences), where he served 1976–1984. He then became bishop of the Indiana Episcopal Area (North and South Indiana Annual Conferences), where he served until his retirement in 1992.

During his tenure as an active bishop, Hodapp served as president of the General Board of Church and Society of the U.M.C. (based in Washington, D.C.), and later as the president of the General Board of Global Ministries (based in New York City). The Hodapps retired to Evansville, Indiana, where they lived for several years, before moving to the Franklin United Methodist Community Home in Franklin, Indiana.

Hodapp served as the trial officer (i.e. judge) in church trials involving sexual misconduct. He presided over a famous trial involving then-pastor Jimmy Creech, who was eventually stripped of his clergy credentials for performing a same-gender union service (a violation of U.M. Church law).

== Death and funeral ==
Bishop Hodapp died at Methodist Hospital in Indianapolis, aged 82. He was survived by his wife and two daughters.

== Episcopal remembrance ==
Bishop Hodapp has been described as a steady, consistent and faithful leader for the U.M. Church. Then current bishop of the Indiana Episcopal Area, Michael J. Coyner when he received word of Hodapp's death, said:

When I think of Leroy Hodapp, the word which comes to my mind is 'faithful'. He served 50 years under appointment, starting as a student pastor, all the way through service as a pastor, campus minister, council director, district superintendent and bishop. A half-century of faithful ministerial service - that is an amazing record.

I was appointed onto the North [Indiana] Cabinet in 1990 by Bishop Hodapp, so I had the opportunity to serve with him during his final two years before his retirement, and I can testify that he was faithful, attentive, informed and courageous in his leadership. During his 16 years as an active bishop, both in Illinois and here in Indiana, Leroy and Polly became beloved to thousands of Unived Methodists. His casual, caring style along with his obvious love for the church endeared him to everyone inside and outside the church.

In the United Methodist Council of Bishops, Leroy Hodapp has been acknowledged for his wisdom, experience and level-headedness. When others might panic over the latest issues and concerns, Leroy has always been a steady, consistent, and faithful (there is that word again) leader for this denomination.

Here in Indiana, we will miss seeing Leroy behind the bench at IU basketball games. We will miss seeing Leroy walking with his beloved Polly. We will miss hearing his stories about camp and churches and pastors and life in general. We will miss him dearly. Please join me in keeping the Hodapp family in our prayers.

== See also ==
- List of bishops of the United Methodist Church
