= WZZB =

- Seymour, Indiana; United States
- Broadcast area: Central Indiana; Louisville metropolitan area; Southern Indiana
- Frequency: 1390 kHz
- Branding: The Buzz 99.3 & 1390

Programming
- Language: English
- Format: Oldies–classic hits
- Affiliations: SRN News; Westwood One

Ownership
- Owner: Midnight Hour Broadcasting, LLC

History
- First air date: November 4, 1949
- Former call signs: WJCD (1949–1990); WQKC (1990–1991)

Technical information
- Licensing authority: FCC
- Facility ID: 58381
- Class: D
- Power: 1,000 watts (day); 74 watts (night)
- Transmitter coordinates: 38°58′33.00″N 85°53′21.00″W
- Translator: 99.3 W257DO (Seymour)

Links
- Public license information: Public file; LMS
- Webcast: Listen live
- Website: wzzb1390.com

WZZB (1390 AM, "The Buzz 99.3 & 1390") is a radio station broadcasting an oldies and classic hits music format. Licensed to Seymour, Indiana. The station is currently owned by Midnight Hour Broadcasting, LLC and features programming from Dial Global.

== History ==
The station was first licensed as WJCD on November 30, 1949. It was part of an AM/FM combo with WJCD-FM broadcasting at 93.7 MHz. On February 15, 1990, the station's call sign was changed to WQKC and on May 24, 1991, the station changed its call sign to the current WZZB. On July 27, 2006, the station was sold to Susquehanna, and on January 11, 2008, the station was sold to Midnight Hour Broadcasting.
