= Rockford, Jackson County, Indiana =

- Unincorporated community and Census-designated place
- Location within Indiana Location within the United States
- Coordinates: 38°59′10″N 85°53′13″W
- Country: United States
- State: Indiana
- County: Jackson
- Township: Redding

Area
  - Total: 0.884 sq mi (2.29 km^{2})
  - Land: 0.854 sq mi (2.21 km^{2})
  - Water: 0.030 sq mi (0.078 km^{2})
- Elevation: 617 ft (188 m)
- ZIP code: 47274
- FIPS code: 18-65376
- GNIS feature ID: 2830420

Rockford is an unincorporated community in Redding Township, Jackson County, Indiana.

== History ==
Rockford was named for the "rocky ford" of the East Fork of the White River where easier crossing was permitted by a rock river bottom.

The village is approximately 1 mile west of Tipton Island along the White River. The area was first settled in about 1813 by James Reno, who was the grandfather of the infamous Reno Gang.

The small community was known as New Rockford and Old Rockford in the 1840s.

In 1852, the terminus of the north–south Jeffersonville, Madison and Indianapolis Railroad was in Rockford.

It was known as a pork packing center and had several established businesses such as a grist mill, post office, Masonic Lodge and a newspaper.

The last newspaper, the Rockford Herald, was printed by Dr Jasper Monroe in 1857. He was persuaded to move to nearby Seymour, Indiana by the town's founder, Meedy Shields, where he published under the name Seymour Times.

Meedy Shields, through skillful maneuvering, succeeded in getting a new east–west rail stop of the Ohio and Mississippi Railroad two miles south of Rockford, which spelled eventual economic doom.

Most original structures were burned out in the 1860s and much of the unkept property was owned by the Reno family.

== Demographics ==
Historical population
Census	Pop.	Note	%±
2023 (est.)	761

The United States Census Bureau defined Rockford as a census designated place in the 2022 American Community Survey.
