= Meedy Shields =

Meedy White Shields

Meedy White Shields (July 8, 1804 - February 6, 1866) was an American pioneer and politician in the state of Indiana, who was successful in various business ventures and founded the city of Seymour. He was a nephew of John Shields of Lewis and Clark fame, a first cousin to General John Tipton and a distant cousin of the diarist Robert Shields.

== Early life ==
Shields was born in what is now Sevier County, Tennessee at Shields Mountain near the site of Fort Shields (a.k.a. Shields Fort) built by his grandfather, Robert. His father James was one of the "Ten Brothers" of the Irish Shields family who had left Tennessee for the Indiana Territory. One of these Ten Brothers was John Shields who was recruited by Lewis and Clark for their 1804 expedition as a gunsmith and scout.

At the age of 7, Shields moved to Harrison County, Indiana. In 1816 his father acquired about 1,200 acres (4.9 km^{2}) of land to the north, in Jackson County, Indiana. At the age of about 16, he manned flatboats on the Ohio River carrying goods to New Orleans returning via the Natchez Trace. He eventually owned several flatboats of his own.

In 1827, he was sued for Malicious Trespass by his neighbor to the north, James Reno, father of the notorious Reno Gang. This was part of a long-standing feud between the Shields and Reno families. James Reno had settled in Jackson County, Indiana in 1813, three years prior to James Shields.

== Mid life ==
Shields then joined the Indiana Militia in 1832 to fight in the Black Hawk War and by the fall of that year, acquired the title of Captain. His only brother William, a member of the Indiana Legislature, died in office in 1841 and his father, James, died in 1848. Shields received a sizeable inheritance by this time. He opened a gristmill in nearby Rockford, Jackson County, Indiana which was the largest commercial center in Jackson County, Indiana at the time.

He was on the Board of Directors for the new Ohio and Mississippi Railroad Eastern Division and successfully persuaded railroad engineer, John Seymour, to bypass Rockford, Jackson County, Indiana on the White River and cross his land. In Seymour's honor, a new town would be built and named Seymour, Indiana.

The new east–west rail line would intersect the established north–south Jeffersonville, Madison and Indianapolis Railroad. To assure that both trains would stop, he joined the Indiana Legislature and authored a Bill requiring them to do so for safety purposes. This assured the demise of nearby Rockford, Jackson County, Indiana.

== Later life ==
Shields sold lots to speculators for the formation of the new town and built a personal fortune valued at over $2 million according to the US Census records of 1860. He died from a stomach ailment in 1866 a wealthy and respected citizen by many, except perhaps by the Reno Gang who had used the burned-out Ghost town of Rockford, Jackson County, Indiana as their home base.

== First train robbery ==
The bill Shields authored requiring trains to stop in Seymour for safety purposes inadvertently created an opportunity for the Reno Gang. With trains halting in the town, gang members were able to rob passengers, and on October 6, 1866—several months after Shields's death—they boarded a stopped train as it left the Seymour depot and robbed its occupants in what is frequently described as the first robbery of a moving train in the United States.

== Legacy ==
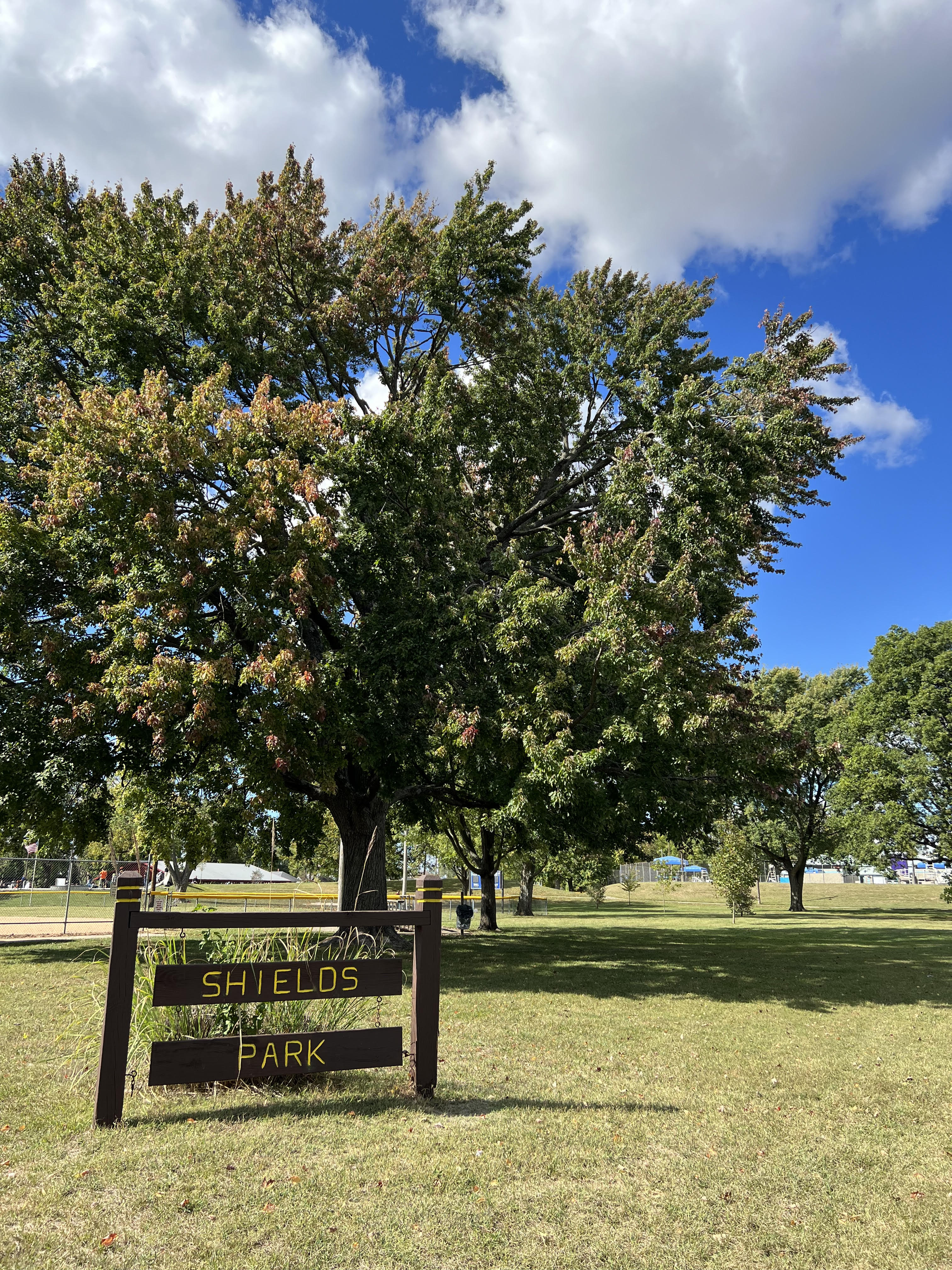
Shields Park in Seymour, designated by Meedy Shields in 1852 and named in his honor

Several landmarks in Seymour commemorate Shields. Shields Park, the oldest park in the city, was designated by Shields in 1852 and is named in his honor. The Farmers Club, a clubhouse built in 1914 and listed on the National Register of Historic Places in 1983, was dedicated as a memorial to Shields by his grandson, M. S. Blish.
