= Sand Hill =

Sand Hill, Sandhill, Sand Hills, or Sandhills may refer to:

== Settlements ==
=== United States ===
- Sand Hill, Oakley, California, a former unincorporated community
- Sand Hill, Georgia, an unincorporated community
- Sand Hill, Kentucky (disambiguation), several places
- Sand Hill, Attala County, Mississippi, a ghost town
- Sand Hill, Copiah County, Mississippi, an unincorporated community
- Sand Hill, Greene County, Mississippi, an unincorporated community
- Sand Hill, Jones County, Mississippi, an unincorporated community
- Sand Hill, Rankin County, Mississippi, an unincorporated community
- Sand Hill, Missouri, an unincorporated community
- Sand Hill, New York, a hamlet
- Sand Hill, Pennsylvania, a census-designated place
- Sand Hill, Marshall County, West Virginia, an unincorporated community
- Sand Hill, Wood County, West Virginia, an unincorporated community

=== Other places ===
- Sandhill, Belize, a village in the Belize District

== Regions in the United States ==
- Sandhills (Carolina), a strip of ancient beach dunes in North and South Carolina
- Sandhills (Nebraska), a region of mixed-grass prairie in north-central Nebraska
- Monahans Sandhills State Park, Monahans, Texas
- Sand Hill Wildlife Management Area, near Parkersburg, West Virginia

== Natural features ==
- Sand Hill (Noble County, Indiana), a hill in Indiana, US
- Sand Hill (Herkimer County, New York), an elevation located in New York, US
- Sand Hill, a subsidiary summit (756 m / 2480 ft) of Hopegill Head, Cumbria, England
- Sand Hill River, tributary of the Red River of the North, western Minnesota, US
- Sandhill, a type of xeric wildfire-maintained ecosystem in the coastal plain of North America

== Other uses ==
- Sand Hill Road, Menlo Park, California, US
- Sandhill Park, a country house in Bishops Lydeard, Somerset, England

== See also ==
- Sandhill crane (Grus canadensis), a large crane of North America and extreme northeastern Siberia
- Sandhill dunnart (Sminthopsis psammophila), a small carnivorous Australian marsupial
- Sandhill frog (Arenophryne rotunda), a small, fossorial frog in Western Australia
- Sandhill rustic (Luperina nickerlii), a noctuid moth
