= Geography of Indiana =

Indiana map of Köppen climate classification.

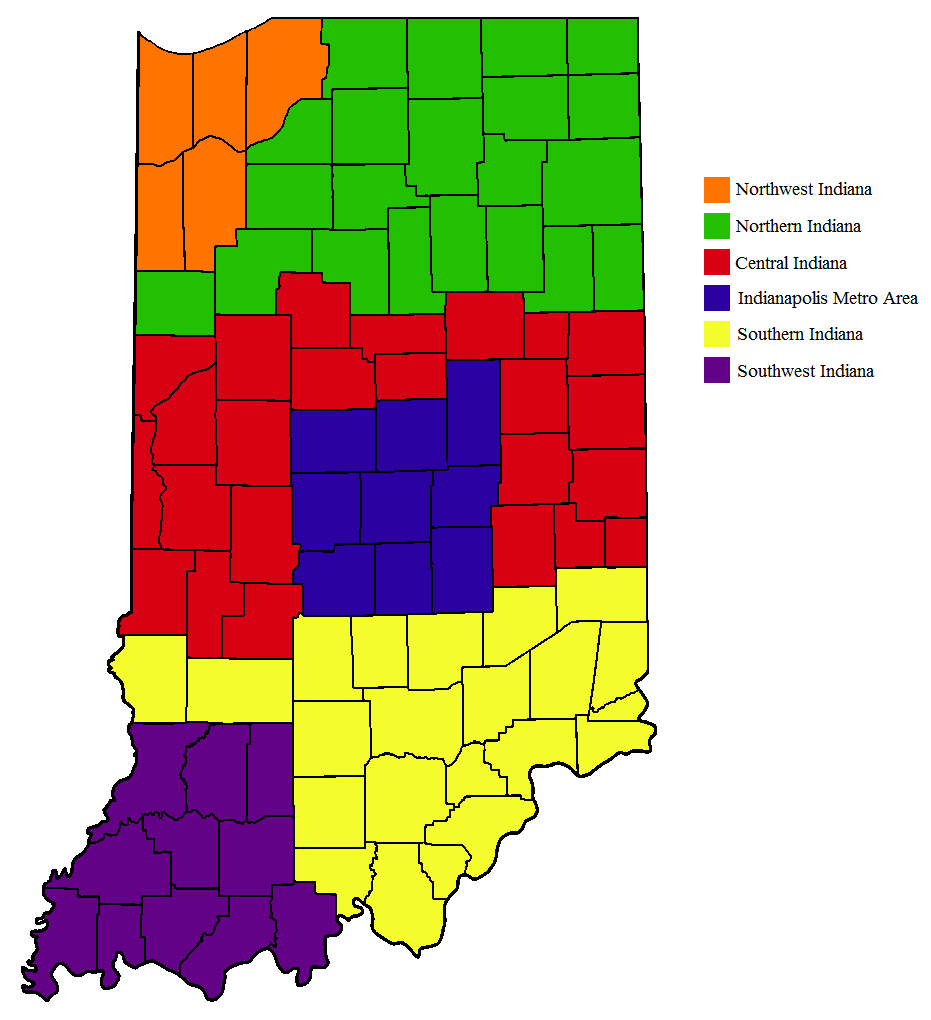
Regions of Indiana

The geography of Indiana comprises the physical features of the land and relative location of U.S. State of Indiana. Indiana is in the north-central United States and borders on Lake Michigan. Surrounding states are Michigan to the north and northeast, Illinois to the west, Kentucky to the south, and Ohio to the east. The entire southern boundary is the Ohio River.

== Statistics ==
- Total area is 36,419.55 square miles (94,326.2 km^{2}), making Indiana the 38th largest in size out of the 50 states.
- Lake Michigan is the largest body of water wholly or partially within the state borders.
- Hoosier Hill in Wayne County is the highest point in the state at 1,257 feet (383 m) above sea level.
- The lowest natural point is on the Ohio River, specifically where Illinois, Indiana, and Kentucky meet at one place. The elevation there is 332.50 feet (101.35 m) above sea level.

== Overview ==
Indiana is bordered on the north by Lake Michigan and the state of Michigan; on the east by Ohio; on the south by Kentucky, with which it shares the Ohio River as a border; and on the west by Illinois. Indiana is one of the Great Lakes states.

The northern boundary of the states of Ohio, Indiana, and Illinois was originally defined to be a latitudinal line drawn through the southernmost tip of Lake Michigan. Since such a line did not provide Indiana with usable frontage on the lake, its northern border was shifted ten miles (16 km) north when it was granted statehood in 1816.

The 475 miles (764 km) long Wabash River bisects the state from northeast to southwest before flowing south, mostly along the Indiana-Illinois border. The river has given Indiana a few theme songs, such as On the Banks of the Wabash, The Wabash Cannonball and Back Home Again, In Indiana. The Wabash is the longest free-flowing river east of the Mississippi River, traversing 400 miles (640 km) from the Huntington dam to the Ohio River. The White River, a tributary of the Wabash, zigzags through central Indiana.

There are 24 Indiana state parks, nine artificial reservoirs, and hundreds of lakes in the state. Areas under the control and protection of the National Park Service or the United States Forest Service include:

- George Rogers Clark National Historical Park in Vincennes
- Indiana Dunes National Park near Michigan City
- Lincoln Boyhood National Memorial in Lincoln City
- Hoosier National Forest in Bedford

== Regions ==
The state of Indiana can be divided into several distinct regions; largest cities in parentheses.

- Northwest (Hammond) – Lake, Porter, La Porte, Jasper, Starke, Newton, Pulaski
- North Central (South Bend) – St. Joseph, Elkhart, Kosciusko, Marshall, Fulton
- Northeast (Fort Wayne) – Adams, Allen, DeKalb, Huntington, Lagrange, Noble, Steuben, Wells, Whitley
- Lower Northwest (Lafayette) – Tippecanoe, Montgomery, Clinton, White, Carroll, Fountain, Benton, Warren
- Lower North Central (Kokomo) – Howard, Cass, Miami, Wabash, Tipton
- West Central (Terre Haute) – Vigo, Clay, Sullivan, Parke, Vermillion
- Central (Indianapolis) – Marion, Hamilton, Hendricks, Johnson, Hancock, Boone, Morgan, Shelby, Putnam
- East Central (Muncie) – Madison, Delaware, Grant, Wayne, Henry, Randolph, Fayette, Jay, Rush, Blackford, Union
- Central Southwest (Bloomington) – Monroe, Greene, Owen
- Central Southeast (Columbus) – Bartholomew, Dearborn, Jackson, Lawrence, Ripley, Jennings, Decatur, Franklin, Brown
- Southwest (Evansville) – Vanderburgh, Warrick, Dubois, Knox, Daviess, Gibson, Posey, Spencer, Perry, Pike, Martin
- Southeast (Jeffersonville / New Albany) – Clark, Floyd, Harrison, Jefferson, Washington, Scott, Orange, Crawford, Switzerland, Ohio

=== Northern Indiana ===
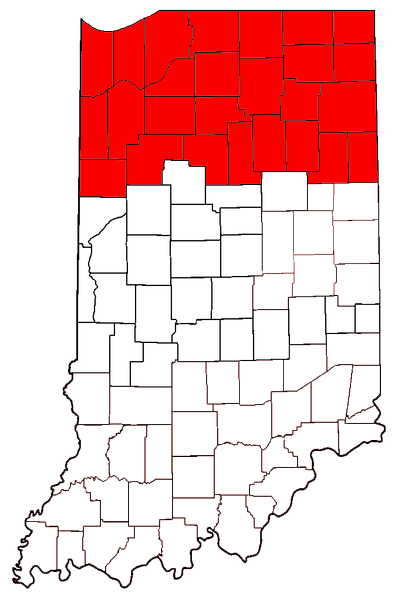
Highlighted are the counties in Northern Indiana.

Northern Indiana consists of 26 counties in the northern third of the state.

The landscape is characterized physically by very flat to rolling terrain ranging from 600 to 1,000 feet (180 to 300 m) above sea level and is similar to central Indiana except for the presence of higher and hillier terminal moraines and many glacial kettle lakes in some areas. Sand dunes and sand ridges also exist along the Lake Michigan shoreline(some reaching near 200 feet in height) and inland around the Kankakee River Basin. The Saint Lawrence River Divide goes through Northern Indiana following the top of the Valparaiso Moraine part of the way. Besides some urban areas, much of Northern Indiana is farmland.

Heavy industry is as much a part of the economy in the eastern two thirds of Northern Indiana as agriculture, and, as a result, the region tends to be associated with the Rust Belt. Northern Indiana as a whole is also the most ethnically diverse region in Indiana.

The northwest corner of the state is part of the Chicago metropolitan area and has nearly one million residents. Gary, and the cities and towns that make up the northern half of Lake, Porter, and La Porte Counties bordering on Lake Michigan, are effectively commuter suburbs of Chicago. Porter and Lake counties are commonly referred to as "The Calumet Region". The name comes from the fact that the Grand Calumet River and Little Calumet rivers run through the area. These counties are in the Central Time Zone, the same as Chicago. NICTD owns and operates the South Shore Line, a commuter rail line that runs electric-powered trains between South Bend and Chicago. Sand dunes and heavy industry share the shoreline of Lake Michigan in northern Indiana. Along the shoreline of Lake Michigan in Northern Indiana one can find many parks between the industrial areas. The Indiana Dunes National Park and the Indiana Dunes State Park are two natural landmarks of the area.

Northwest Indiana is marked with swell and swale topography as it retreats South from Lake Michigan (which are remnants of the beaches of ancient Lake Michigan) and is one of the marshiest parts of the state. The ecology changes dramatically between swells, or on opposite sides of the same swell. Plants and animals adapted to marshes are generally found in the swales, while forests or even prickly pear cactus and six-lined racerunners are found in the dryer swells.

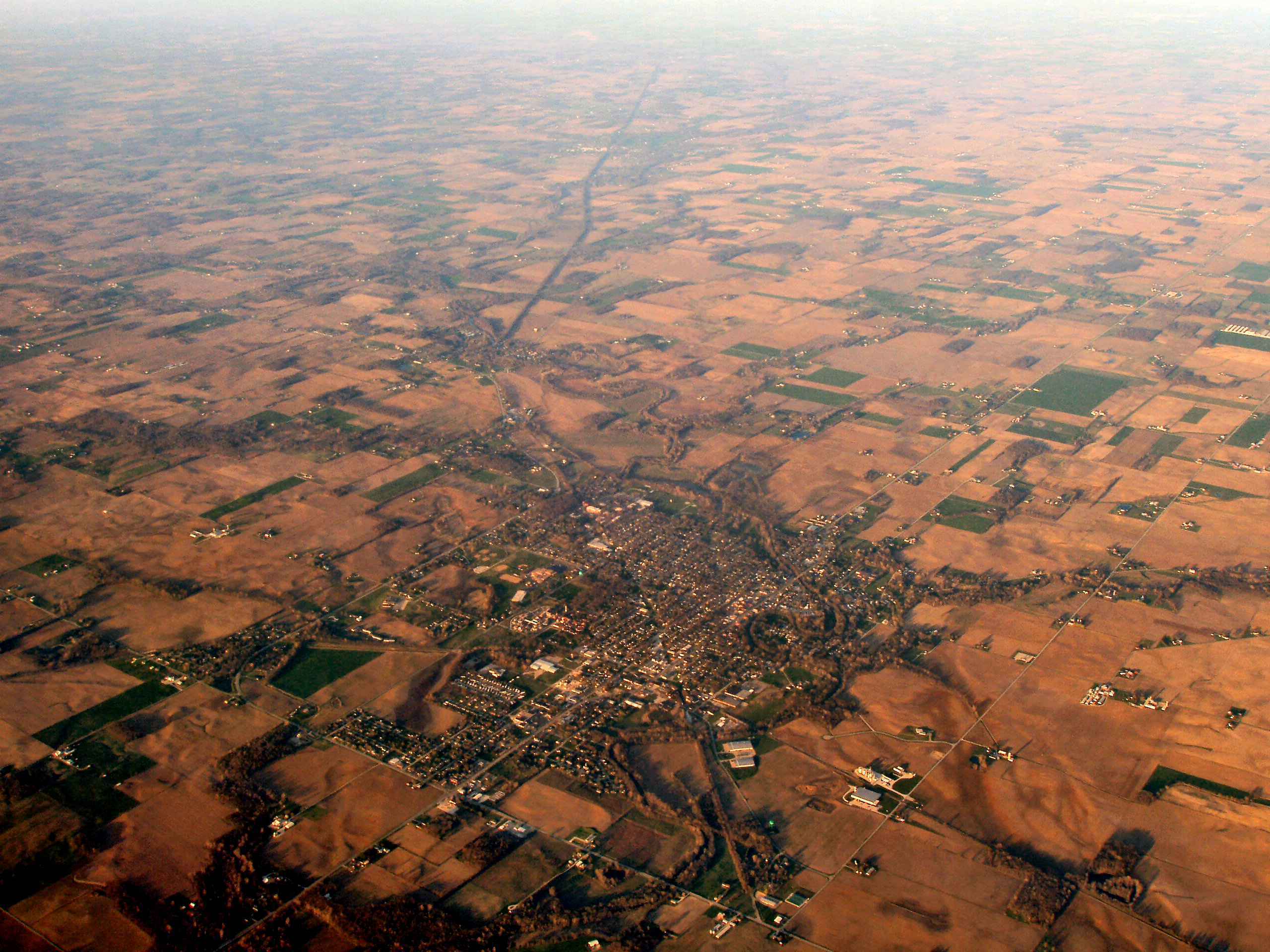
Most of north central Indiana is rolling to flat farmland dotted with small cities and towns, such as North Manchester. Much of Northern Indiana is considered part of Amish Country and holds the nation's second largest population of such people.

The Kankakee River, which winds through northern Indiana, serves somewhat as a demarcating line between suburban northwest Indiana and the rest of the state. Before it was drained and developed for agriculture, the Kankakee Marsh was one of the largest freshwater marshes in the country. South of the Kankakee is a large area of prairie, the eastern edge of the Grand Prairie that covers Iowa and Illinois. The prairie chicken and American bison were common in Indiana's pioneer era, but are now extinct as wild species within the state.

The South Bend metropolitan area, in north central Indiana, is the center of commerce in the region better known as Michiana. Other cities located within the area include Elkhart, Mishawaka, Goshen, and Warsaw. Fort Wayne, the state's second-largest city, is located in the northeastern part of the state where it serves the state as a transportation hub. Other cities located within the area include Huntington and Marion. East of Fort Wayne is an area of extremely flat land that, before development, was the westernmost reach of the Great Black Swamp.

Northeastern Indiana is home to a number of lakes, many of which are kettle lakes, which were caused by the glaciers that covered Indiana thousands of years ago and Glacial Lake Maumee. Some of these lakes include Lake James in Pokagon State Park, Lake Maxinkuckee, Lake Wawasee and Lake Tippecanoe. Lake Wawasee is the largest natural lake in Indiana, while Lake Tippecanoe is the deepest lake, reaching depths of over 120 feet (37 m). Both lakes are located in Kosciusko County. Chain O' Lakes State Park, located in Noble County, contains 11 lakes, 8 of which are connected by natural channels.

==== Michiana ====
The center third of this region is known as the Indiana section of Michiana. South Bend is the cultural and economic center of the Michiana region.

==== Maumee Valley ====
The eastern third of this region centers around the Fort Wayne area and the Maumee River basin.

=== Central Indiana ===
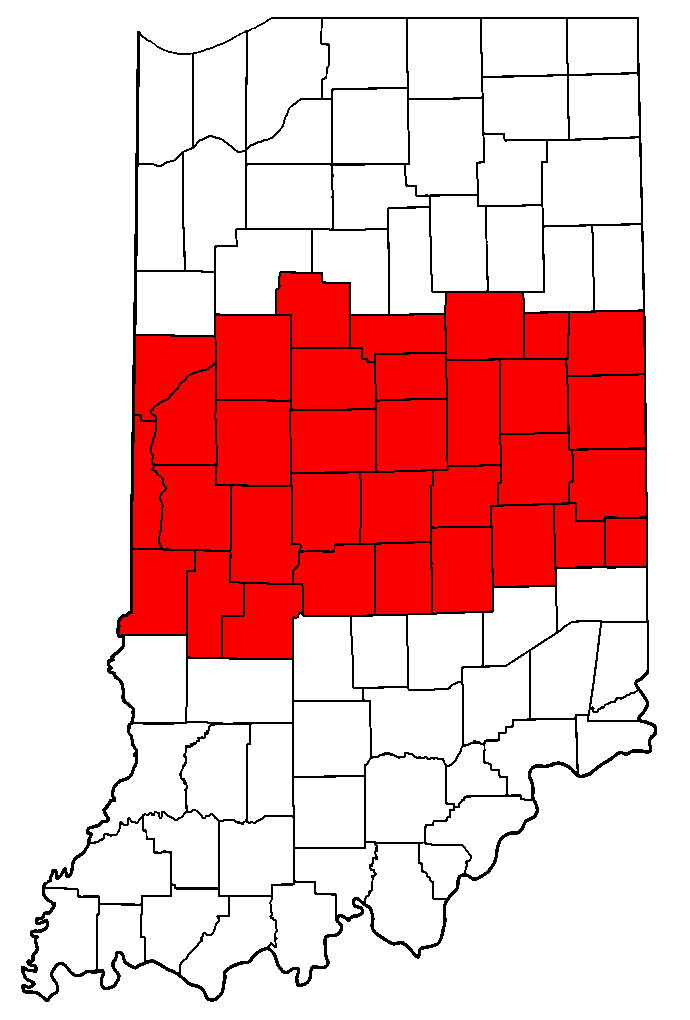
Highlighted are the counties in Central Indiana

Central Indiana comprises the 33 counties in the middle third of the state. However, many Hoosiers, or people living in Indiana, consider central Indiana as the Indianapolis metropolitan area. The region's dominant city is Indianapolis, the state capital and most populous city in Indiana. Other prominent cities include Anderson, Kokomo, Lafayette, Muncie, Richmond, and Terre Haute. Home to about 3.3 million people, Central Indiana is the most populous of the state's three regions.

Physically, the land in Central Indiana is characterized primarily by low, gently rolling hills and shallow valleys. Some counties of the region, like Howard County, are generally flat, while others, such as Morgan County, are more rugged and hilly. Tippecanoe County is trisected by the Wabash River, Tippecanoe River, and Wildcat Creek, has perhaps the most diverse physiography of the region. Elevation ranges from 600 to 1,000 feet (180 to 300 metres) above sea level. Forests and farmland line Central Indiana's gently rolling plains and river valleys. The highest point in Indiana is Hoosier Hill, at 1,257 feet (383 m) above sea level in northern Wayne County. Rural areas in the central portion of the state are typically composed of a patchwork of fields and forested areas. The geography of Central Indiana consists of gently rolling hills and sandstone ravines carved out by the retreating glaciers. Many of these ravines can be found in west-central Indiana, specifically along Sugar Creek in Turkey Run and Shades state parks.

Central Indiana's economy is primarily driven by health and education, agriculture, and manufacturing. Major universities include Ball State University, Butler University, Purdue University, Indiana State University, Indiana University Indianapolis, and Indiana Wesleyan University, among several other private liberal arts colleges, such as DePauw, Earlham, Franklin, and Wabash.

=== Southern Indiana ===
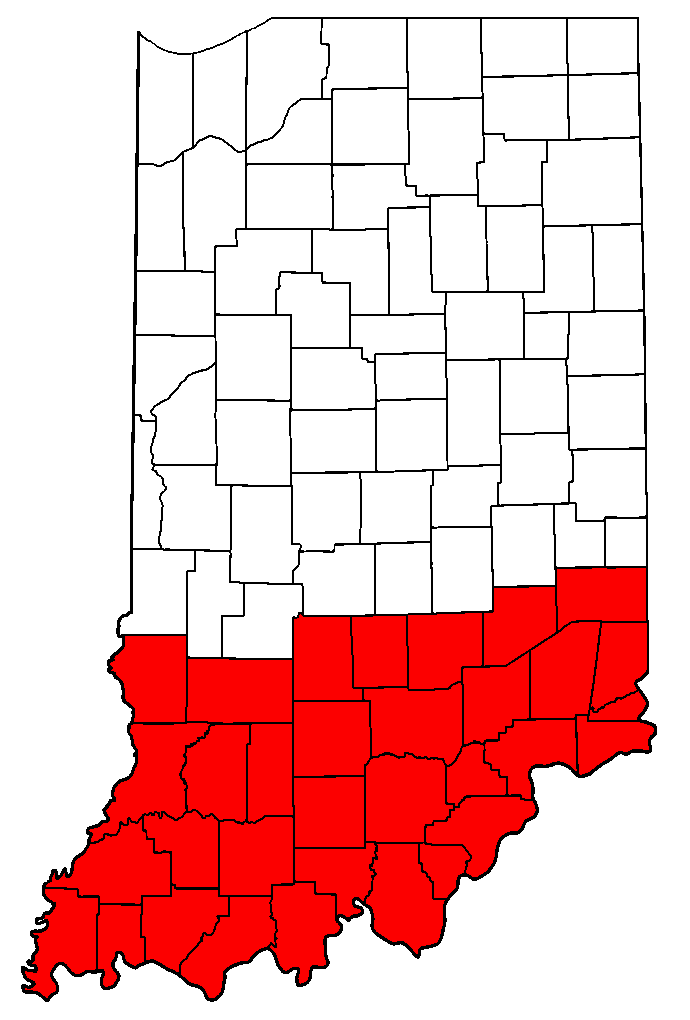
Highlighted are the counties of Southern Indiana.

Evansville, the third largest city in Indiana, is located in the southwestern corner of the state. It is located in a tri-state area that includes Illinois, Indiana, and Kentucky. The southern cities of Clarksville, Jeffersonville, and New Albany are part of the Louisville metropolitan area and are in the area called Kentuckiana. Bloomington, the home of Indiana University's main campus, and Columbus, a small industrial city, are located in the northern part of this region called south-central Indiana. Vincennes, founded by French traders in 1732 and the oldest settlement in the state, is located on the Wabash River and served as the first capital of the Indiana Territory. Vincennes is also home of the Pantheon Theatre. Indiana was settled from its southern periphery northward; many more of its oldest settlements, including its first capital, Corydon, are in southern Indiana. Until 1950, the United States Census found the center of population to lie in southern Indiana.

Southern Indiana is a mixture of farmland, forest and very hilly areas, especially near Louisville and in the south central lime hills areas, stretching from the Ohio River to as far north as Greencastle, to the wide, flat valleys along the Wabash and Ohio rivers. The Hoosier National Forest is a 200,000-acre (810 km^{2}) nature preserve in south-central Indiana. Southern Indiana's topography is more varied than that in the north and generally contains more hills and geographic variation than the northern portion, such as the "Knobs", a series of 1,000 ft (300 m) hills that run parallel to the Ohio River in south-central Indiana. The largely flat and flood-prone bottomlands of Indiana, where the Wabash, White, and Ohio Rivers converge, hosts numerous plant and animal species normally found in the Lower Mississippi and Gulf Coast region of the United States. Brown County is well known for its hills covered with colorful autumn foliage, the former home of T. C. Steele, and Nashville, the county seat and shopping destination. Harrison and Crawford Counties boast three of the state's most popular commercial caves at Wyandotte, Marengo, and Squire Boone Caverns.

The limestone geology of Southern Indiana has created numerous caves and one of the largest limestone quarry regions in the United States. Many of Indiana's official buildings, such as the Indiana Statehouse, the downtown monuments, the Indiana University School of Law in Indianapolis, many buildings at Indiana University Bloomington, and the Indiana Government Center, are all examples of Indiana architecture made with Indiana limestone. Indiana limestone has also been used in many other famous structures in the United States, such as the Empire State Building, the Pentagon, and the Washington National Cathedral. In addition, 35 of the 50 state capitols are made of Indiana limestone.

== Physiography ==
Indiana is broken up into three main physical regions: The Great Lakes Plain in the northern third of the state, the Tipton Till Plain in the central third, and the Southern Hills and Lowlands region in the southern third.

== Geology ==
Two-thirds of Indiana is covered with glacial till, from a few feet to hundreds of feet thick. The visible geology of the State is therefore mainly Quaternary, with rocks buried deeply. The southern third of the state is unglaciated and the bedrock becomes visible. The Cincinnati Arch and the Kankakee Arch are the predominant geologic features which control the underlying bedrock. The oldest bedrock is Ordovician, forming an arch across the state from the southeastern corner near Cincinnati north and westward to the northwestern corner near Chicago. These layers of shale and limestone are exposed at the surface only in the southern reaches. Parallel to this line on north and south edges is a narrow band of Silurian age bedrock. These are primarily limestone and dolomite. The next band of rocks are Devonian in age and pass under Lafayette, Indianapolis and New Albany, across the Ohio River from Louisville. Greater erosion and thinner layers of glacial till have created surface exposures along river vallies. The last band of bedrock is from the Carboniferous age and covers nearly a third of the state's southwestern area. There the state's ‘coal measures’ are exposed and major surface mining activities have built the local economies. A narrow belt of Mississippian age limestone, shale, and sandstone occurs west and southwards of Bloomington and had become known for its production of Indiana Limestone an important building material.

=== Coal ===
Indiana's ‘Coal Measures’ are in the southwest corner of the state, where the bedrock is of the Pennsylvanian era.

=== Rivers ===
The Wabash River is the longest river in Indiana and cuts across the state from east to west. The Wabash and its main tributaries, the Salamonie River, Mississinewa River, Eel River, Tippecanoe River, White River, Vermilion River, and Embarras River drain Central Indiana. The Iroquois and Kankakee Rivers begin in Indiana and flow westward into Illinois before reaching the Mississippi River. The St. Joseph River flows from the state of Michigan through the northern counties at South Bend before returning to Michigan and ending at Lake Michigan. The Maumee River in the northeast is formed by the St. Mary's River and the St. Joseph River, which join in Fort Wayne before flowing into the state of Ohio to end at Lake Erie. The Ohio River forms the southern boundary of the State, draining the lower two tiers of counties.

== Climate statistics for selected cities ==
Climate data for Evansville Regional Airport, Indiana (1991–2020 normals, extremes 1897−present) (Note: Snowfall and snow depth records only date to 1 January 1948.)
Month	Jan	Feb	Mar	Apr	May	Jun	Jul	Aug	Sep	Oct	Nov	Dec	Year
Record high °F (°C)	76 (24)	79 (26)	88 (31)	91 (33)	98 (37)	107 (42)	111 (44)	105 (41)	104 (40)	96 (36)	86 (30)	77 (25)	111 (44)
Mean maximum °F (°C)	63.4 (17.4)	69.2 (20.7)	76.5 (24.7)	83.1 (28.4)	89.3 (31.8)	94.4 (34.7)	96.0 (35.6)	95.6 (35.3)	93.0 (33.9)	85.8 (29.9)	74.4 (23.6)	65.6 (18.7)	97.6 (36.4)
Mean daily maximum °F (°C)	41.7 (5.4)	46.7 (8.2)	56.8 (13.8)	68.4 (20.2)	77.3 (25.2)	85.7 (29.8)	88.6 (31.4)	87.9 (31.1)	81.9 (27.7)	70.1 (21.2)	56.2 (13.4)	45.6 (7.6)	67.2 (19.6)
Daily mean °F (°C)	33.6 (0.9)	37.6 (3.1)	46.6 (8.1)	57.2 (14.0)	66.9 (19.4)	75.5 (24.2)	78.7 (25.9)	77.3 (25.2)	70.3 (21.3)	58.6 (14.8)	46.3 (7.9)	37.5 (3.1)	57.2 (14.0)
Mean daily minimum °F (°C)	25.5 (−3.6)	28.4 (−2.0)	36.4 (2.4)	46.1 (7.8)	56.6 (13.7)	65.3 (18.5)	68.8 (20.4)	66.7 (19.3)	58.6 (14.8)	47.1 (8.4)	36.5 (2.5)	29.5 (−1.4)	47.1 (8.4)
Mean minimum °F (°C)	5.0 (−15.0)	10.4 (−12.0)	18.6 (−7.4)	29.9 (−1.2)	40.9 (4.9)	51.7 (10.9)	58.8 (14.9)	56.6 (13.7)	43.8 (6.6)	30.9 (−0.6)	21.2 (−6.0)	10.9 (−11.7)	1.7 (−16.8)
Record low °F (°C)	−21 (−29)	−23 (−31)	−9 (−23)	23 (−5)	28 (−2)	41 (5)	47 (8)	43 (6)	31 (−1)	21 (−6)	−3 (−19)	−15 (−26)	−23 (−31)
Average precipitation inches (mm)	3.35 (85)	3.22 (82)	4.60 (117)	5.14 (131)	5.12 (130)	4.44 (113)	4.38 (111)	3.07 (78)	3.31 (84)	3.39 (86)	4.11 (104)	3.78 (96)	47.91 (1,217)
Average snowfall inches (cm)	3.4 (8.6)	3.1 (7.9)	1.1 (2.8)	0.0 (0.0)	0.0 (0.0)	0.0 (0.0)	0.0 (0.0)	0.0 (0.0)	0.0 (0.0)	0.2 (0.51)	0.2 (0.51)	2.8 (7.1)	10.8 (27)
Average precipitation days (≥ 0.01 in)	10.4	9.7	11.2	11.7	12.6	10.1	9.6	6.9	7.5	8.3	9.6	10.4	118.0
Average snowy days (≥ 0.1 in)	2.8	2.4	0.8	0.1	0.0	0.0	0.0	0.0	0.0	0.1	0.4	1.7	8.3
Average relative humidity (%)	71.6	71.0	68.4	64.7	67.7	67.5	70.9	72.8	73.4	69.4	71.2	74.2	70.2
Mean monthly sunshine hours	143.9	149.1	201.9	232.5	283.2	317.8	321.5	304.5	250.4	223.1	145.2	128.3	2,701.4
Percentage possible sunshine	47	49	54	59	64	72	71	72	67	64	48	43	61
Source: NOAA (relative humidity and sun 1961−1990)

Climate data for Indianapolis (Indianapolis International Airport), 1991–2020 normals, (Note: Mean monthly maxima and minima (i.e. the expected highest and lowest temperature readings at any point during the year or given month) calculated based on data at said location from 1991 to 2020.) extremes 1871–present (Note: Official records for Indianapolis kept at downtown from February 1871 to December 1942, and at Indianapolis Int'l since January 1943. For more information, see Threadex)
Month	Jan	Feb	Mar	Apr	May	Jun	Jul	Aug	Sep	Oct	Nov	Dec	Year
Record high °F (°C)	71 (22)	77 (25)	88 (31)	90 (32)	96 (36)	104 (40)	106 (41)	103 (39)	100 (38)	92 (33)	81 (27)	74 (23)	106 (41)
Mean maximum °F (°C)	58.8 (14.9)	64.4 (18.0)	74.0 (23.3)	80.8 (27.1)	87.1 (30.6)	91.9 (33.3)	93.4 (34.1)	92.6 (33.7)	90.7 (32.6)	82.8 (28.2)	70.5 (21.4)	61.7 (16.5)	94.9 (34.9)
Mean daily maximum °F (°C)	36.1 (2.3)	40.8 (4.9)	51.9 (11.1)	63.9 (17.7)	73.4 (23.0)	82.0 (27.8)	85.2 (29.6)	84.3 (29.1)	78.2 (25.7)	65.6 (18.7)	51.8 (11.0)	40.4 (4.7)	62.8 (17.1)
Daily mean °F (°C)	28.5 (−1.9)	32.5 (0.3)	42.4 (5.8)	53.6 (12.0)	63.6 (17.6)	72.5 (22.5)	75.8 (24.3)	74.7 (23.7)	67.8 (19.9)	55.5 (13.1)	43.3 (6.3)	33.3 (0.7)	53.6 (12.0)
Mean daily minimum °F (°C)	20.9 (−6.2)	24.2 (−4.3)	33.0 (0.6)	43.3 (6.3)	53.7 (12.1)	62.9 (17.2)	66.4 (19.1)	65.0 (18.3)	57.4 (14.1)	45.5 (7.5)	34.9 (1.6)	26.2 (−3.2)	44.4 (6.9)
Mean minimum °F (°C)	−2.1 (−18.9)	4.8 (−15.1)	14.9 (−9.5)	27.2 (−2.7)	37.8 (3.2)	49.2 (9.6)	56.1 (13.4)	55.1 (12.8)	43.1 (6.2)	30.2 (−1.0)	19.6 (−6.9)	6.8 (−14.0)	−4.9 (−20.5)
Record low °F (°C)	−27 (−33)	−21 (−29)	−7 (−22)	18 (−8)	27 (−3)	37 (3)	46 (8)	41 (5)	30 (−1)	20 (−7)	−5 (−21)	−23 (−31)	−27 (−33)
Average precipitation inches (mm)	3.12 (79)	2.43 (62)	3.69 (94)	4.34 (110)	4.75 (121)	4.95 (126)	4.42 (112)	3.20 (81)	3.14 (80)	3.22 (82)	3.45 (88)	2.92 (74)	43.63 (1,108)
Average snowfall inches (cm)	8.8 (22)	6.0 (15)	3.2 (8.1)	0.2 (0.51)	0.0 (0.0)	0.0 (0.0)	0.0 (0.0)	0.0 (0.0)	0.0 (0.0)	0.1 (0.25)	0.8 (2.0)	6.4 (16)	25.5 (65)
Average extreme snow depth inches (cm)	5.0 (13)	3.6 (9.1)	2.3 (5.8)	0.1 (0.25)	0.0 (0.0)	0.0 (0.0)	0.0 (0.0)	0.0 (0.0)	0.0 (0.0)	0.0 (0.0)	0.3 (0.76)	3.4 (8.6)	7.3 (19)
Average precipitation days (≥ 0.01 in)	12.3	10.3	11.5	11.9	13.3	11.5	10.3	8.3	7.9	8.9	10.2	11.8	128.2
Average snowy days (≥ 0.1 in)	7.0	5.8	2.4	0.3	0.0	0.0	0.0	0.0	0.0	0.1	1.2	5.6	22.4
Average relative humidity (%)	75.0	73.6	69.9	65.6	67.1	68.4	72.8	75.4	74.4	71.6	75.5	78.0	72.3
Average dew point °F (°C)	18.1 (−7.7)	21.6 (−5.8)	30.9 (−0.6)	39.7 (4.3)	50.5 (10.3)	59.9 (15.5)	64.9 (18.3)	63.7 (17.6)	56.7 (13.7)	44.1 (6.7)	34.9 (1.6)	24.4 (−4.2)	42.4 (5.8)
Mean monthly sunshine hours	132.1	145.7	178.3	214.8	264.7	287.2	295.2	273.7	232.6	196.6	117.1	102.4	2,440.4
Percentage possible sunshine	44	49	48	54	59	64	65	64	62	57	39	35	55
Average ultraviolet index	2	3	4	6	8	9	9	8	6	4	2	2	5
Source 1: NOAA (relative humidity, dew point, and sun 1961–1990
Source 2: Weather Atlas (UV)

Climate data for South Bend, Indiana (South Bend Regional Airport), 1981–2010 normals, extremes 1893–present
Month	Jan	Feb	Mar	Apr	May	Jun	Jul	Aug	Sep	Oct	Nov	Dec	Year
Record high °F (°C)	68 (20)	74 (23)	85 (29)	91 (33)	97 (36)	106 (41)	109 (43)	105 (41)	99 (37)	92 (33)	82 (28)	70 (21)	109 (43)
Mean maximum °F (°C)	53.9 (12.2)	56.5 (13.6)	70.9 (21.6)	80.2 (26.8)	87.3 (30.7)	92.8 (33.8)	93.5 (34.2)	91.7 (33.2)	89.3 (31.8)	81.6 (27.6)	67.2 (19.6)	56.3 (13.5)	95.3 (35.2)
Mean daily maximum °F (°C)	31.2 (−0.4)	34.9 (1.6)	46.2 (7.9)	59.0 (15.0)	70.1 (21.2)	79.4 (26.3)	82.7 (28.2)	80.8 (27.1)	74.4 (23.6)	61.8 (16.6)	47.7 (8.7)	36.3 (2.4)	58.7 (14.8)
Daily mean °F (°C)	24.1 (−4.4)	27.1 (−2.7)	36.7 (2.6)	48.1 (8.9)	59.1 (15.1)	68.8 (20.4)	72.4 (22.4)	70.7 (21.5)	63.7 (17.6)	52.0 (11.1)	39.8 (4.3)	29.6 (−1.3)	49.3 (9.6)
Mean daily minimum °F (°C)	17.0 (−8.3)	19.3 (−7.1)	27.2 (−2.7)	37.1 (2.8)	48.1 (8.9)	58.1 (14.5)	62.1 (16.7)	60.5 (15.8)	53.0 (11.7)	42.1 (5.6)	31.8 (−0.1)	23.0 (−5.0)	39.9 (4.4)
Mean minimum °F (°C)	−4.5 (−20.3)	1.6 (−16.9)	9.9 (−12.3)	22.6 (−5.2)	33.7 (0.9)	44.1 (6.7)	51.1 (10.6)	50.5 (10.3)	39.2 (4.0)	29.4 (−1.4)	18.4 (−7.6)	4.4 (−15.3)	−7.7 (−22.1)
Record low °F (°C)	−22 (−30)	−20 (−29)	−13 (−25)	11 (−12)	24 (−4)	35 (2)	42 (6)	40 (4)	29 (−2)	12 (−11)	−7 (−22)	−18 (−28)	−22 (−30)
Average precipitation inches (mm)	2.66 (68)	2.31 (59)	2.35 (60)	3.49 (89)	4.20 (107)	4.04 (103)	3.78 (96)	4.01 (102)	3.49 (89)	3.72 (94)	2.78 (71)	2.40 (61)	39.23 (996)
Average snowfall inches (cm)	21.6 (55)	16.1 (41)	6.8 (17)	1.0 (2.5)	0.0 (0.0)	0.0 (0.0)	0.0 (0.0)	0.0 (0.0)	0.0 (0.0)	0.2 (0.51)	5.1 (13)	13.7 (35)	64.5 (164)
Average precipitation days (≥ 0.01 in)	16.8	12.5	12.4	13.4	13.4	11.0	9.5	10.0	9.6	11.5	12.6	14.8	147.5
Average snowy days (≥ 0.1 in)	13.1	9.7	5.1	1.5	0.0	0.0	0.0	0.0	0.1	0.3	3.4	9.0	42.2
Source: NOAA

== See also ==
- Indiana
- List of counties in Indiana
- Midwestern United States
