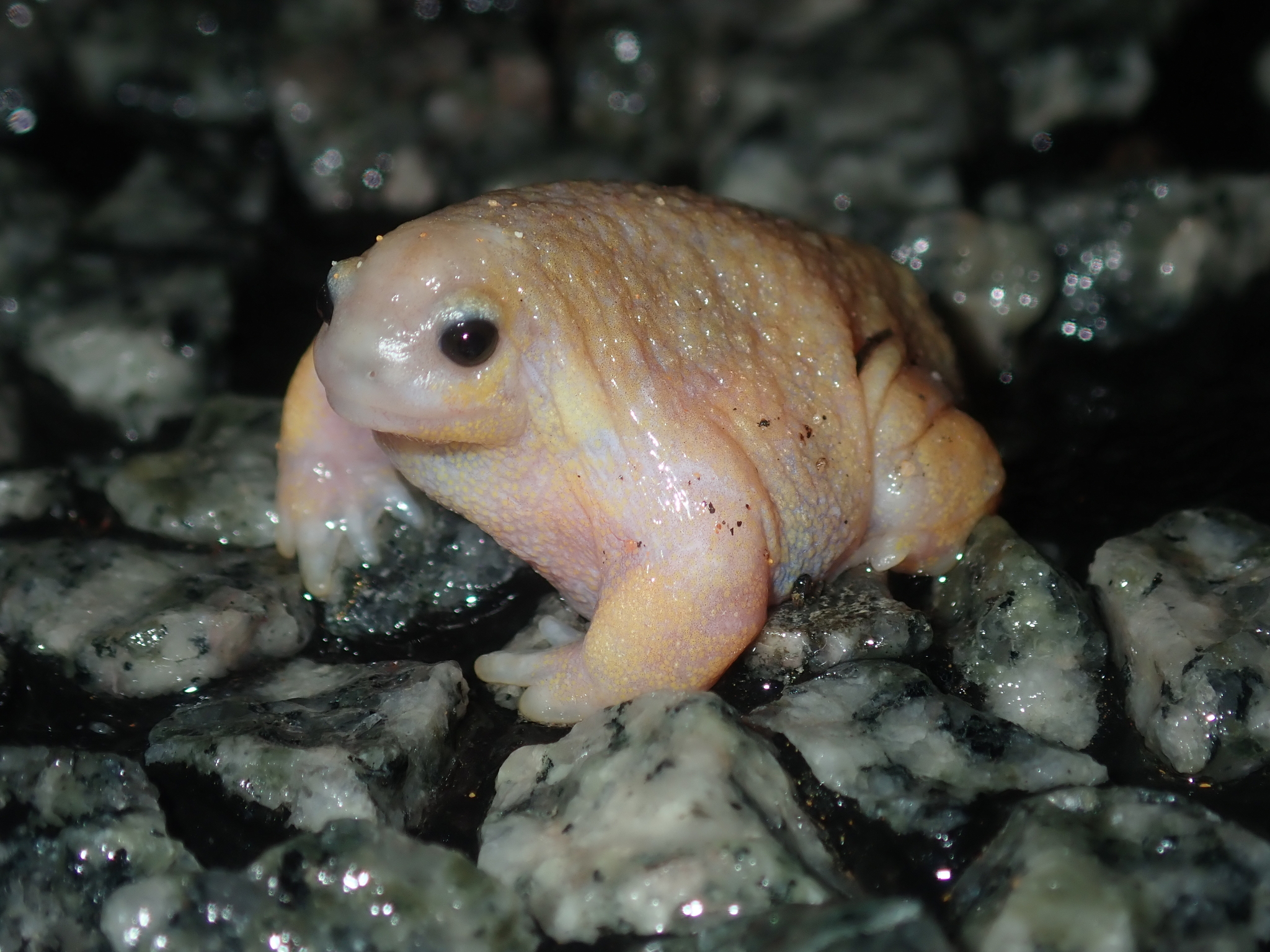

Conservation status
- Least Concern (IUCN 3.1)

Scientific classification
- Kingdom: Animalia
- Phylum: Chordata
- Class: Amphibia
- Order: Anura
- Family: Myobatrachidae
- Genus: Myobatrachus; Schlegel in J. E. Gray, 1841 or 1850
- Species: M. gouldii

Binomial name
- Myobatrachus gouldii Gray, 1841
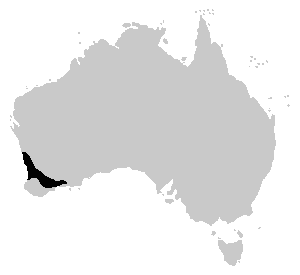
- Range of turtle frog

= Myobatrachus =

Turtle frog

Genus of amphibians

Myobatrachus is a genus of frogs found in Western Australia. It is monotypic, being represented by the single species, Myobatrachus gouldii, also known as the turtle frog. It gets its name from its resemblance to a shell-less turtle. It is described to have an extremely small narrow head, short limbs, and a round body. They can get up to 45 millimetres (1.8 in) long. Anatomy studies of this species say that it has an incredibly large pectoral girdle for its size. Due to its unusual morphology, the features of this creature are thought to originate with old frog lineages from the early Tertiary or late Mesozoic eras.

== Habitat ==
The turtle frog can be found in between Geraldton and Fitzgerald River in the Perth region, in Southwestern Australia. This area is mainly semi-arid, so the frogs have adapted to suit this region and this region only. They are not found or recorded to have been found in any other place or region. Despite only living in one region of the world, these frogs are currently of "least concern" to become endangered. Like normal frogs, the turtle frog comes out of the ground and into the open when it rains or storms.

These frogs have developed short muscular limbs to help them dig into the sand but, unlike most frogs, they dig forward, like a turtle. They feed on termites, so the adaptation of the muscular limbs and large pectoral girdle is useful when trying to penetrate a termite mound. They do not need to live near standing pools of water, as they undergo the entire metamorphosis stage within their eggs. This means that they leave their eggs fully formed, skipping the tadpole stage (an unusual life cycle shared by a few other frog genera, e.g. Eleutherodactylus, Arenophryne, and other members its genus). Their closest relatives, among the few who share most of the turtle frog's traits, are sandhill frogs and forest toadlets.

== Diet ==
The turtle frog's diet is composed exclusively of termites. It has adapted to this diet by constructing its home near termite mounds. This allows it to get plentiful food, with an average frog to be able to eat approximately 400 termites in a single meal.

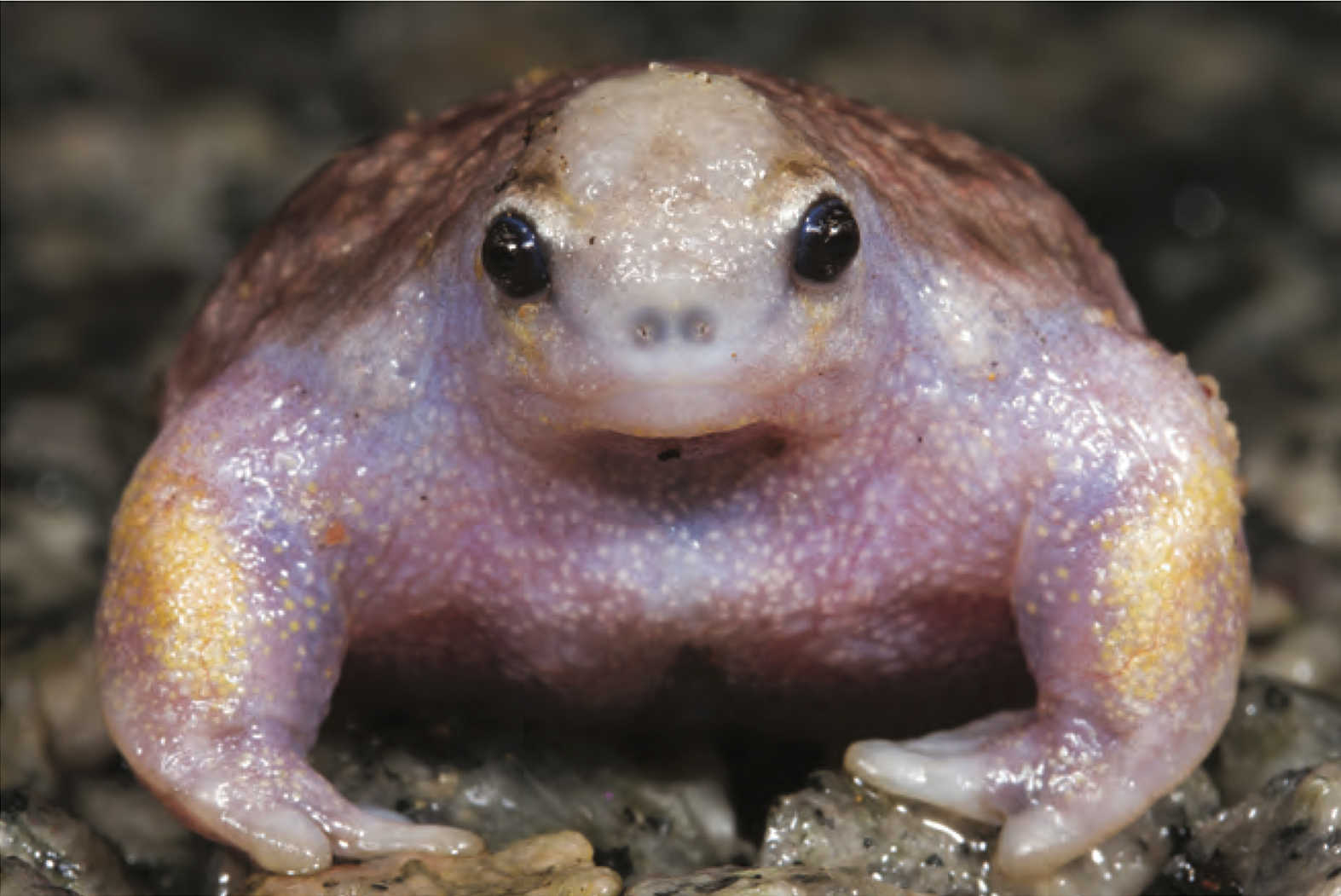
Image of a turtle frog

== Mating ==
Mating behavior begins with the male frog calling. Calling and pairing occur primarily in the late spring. When a pair of turtle frogs select each other as mates, they retire to the base of their burrow and remain underground with their mate over the summer. The egg deposit does not occur until late summer or early autumn. Burrows may be as much as 1.3 meters (4 ft 3 in) deep. Breeding takes place within the burrow several months later. When the females lay eggs, they lay up to 50, and each can measure 7.5 millimeters (0.30 in) in diameter. The eggs undergo direct development inside the egg capsule.

== Related species ==
The albumins of frogs in the Arenophryne and Myobatrachus genera have unique physical traits, suggesting that they share an evolutionary ancestor. Their common ancestor may originate in the Miocene period, or the more recent Pliocene era. Myobatrachus and Arenophryne are closer in relation than Metacrinia and Pseudophryne, the frogs' recent relatives.
