= Sandra Hill =

Sandra Hill may refer to:

- Sandy Hill (television personality) (born 1947), American broadcast journalist
- Sandy Hill (mountaineer) (born 1955), American author
- Sandra Hill (footballer) (born 1998), Cambodian futsal player
- Sandra Hill (author), Romance novelist

== See also ==
- San Hill, character in List of Star Wars species (K–O)
- Sand Hill (disambiguation)
- Sandy Hill (disambiguation)
