= Sand Hill, West Virginia =

Sand Hill, West Virginia may refer to:

- Sand Hill, Marshall County, West Virginia, an unincorporated community
- Sand Hill, Wood County, West Virginia, an unincorporated community
