= Weed Patch Hill =

Summit in Indiana, U.S.

- Location within Indiana

Highest point
- Elevation: 1,058 ft (322 m)
- Coordinates: 39°10′01″N 86°13′03″W

Geography
- Location: Brown County, Indiana, U.S.
- Parent range: Knobstone Escarpment
- Topo map: USGS Nashville

Climbing
- Easiest route: Hike

Weed Patch Hill, also known as Weed Patch Knob (1,058 feet or 322 m), is the third highest named summit in the U.S. state of Indiana. Located in Washington Township and Brown County State Park, it is the highest point in the Knobstone Escarpment.

In Indiana, only Hoosier Hill (1,257 feet or 383 m) in Wayne County and Sand Hill (1,076 feet or 328 m) in Noble County are higher.

Weed Patch Hill was so named by an early settler after a tornado had flattened a stand of trees and weeds grew in its place.
