= Hoosier Hill =

Highest natural point in the U.S. state of Indiana

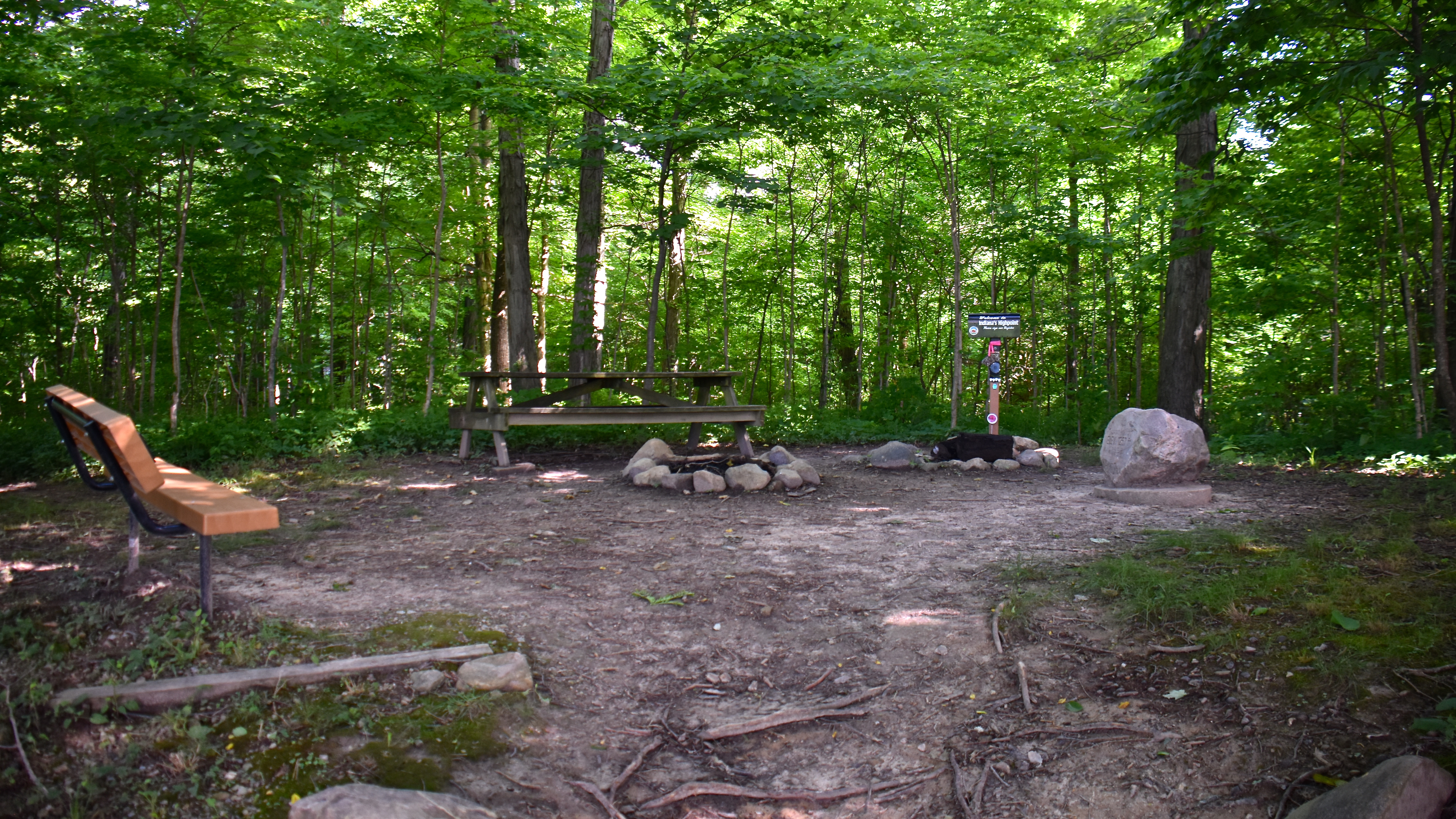
- The "summit" of Hoosier Hill, the highest point in Indiana, June 2018.

Highest point
- Elevation: 1,257 ft (383 m)
- Prominence: 297 ft (91 m)
- Listing: U.S. state high point 44th
- Coordinates: 40°0′04.39″N 84°50′55.28″W

Naming
- Pronunciation: /ˈhuːʒər/

Geography
- Location within Indiana
- Location: Wayne County, Indiana, United States
- Topo map: USGS Spartanburg

Climbing
- Easiest route: Drive

Hoosier Hill is the highest natural point in the U.S. state of Indiana with a claimed elevation of 1,257 feet (383 meters) above sea level. Hoosier Hill's claimed elevation is based on SRTM digital elevation data which is now considered to be outdated. Using newer elevation tools such as USGS's 3DEP, the top of Hoosier Hill is closer to 1,255.48 feet (382.67 meters) above sea level. Hoosier Hill is in the rural area of Franklin Township, Wayne County to the northwest of Bethel. The nearest intersection to the high point is Elliot Road and County Line Road. The nearest major landmark is Interstate 70 and Richmond 11 miles (18 km) to the south.

Hoosier Hill sits on private property owned by Kim E. Goble. The high point sits in a forested area surrounded by farmland. In 2005, an Eagle Scout candidate named Kyle Cummings (Troop 820 from Lakeside Park, Kentucky), in cooperation with the property owner, built a trail, sign and picnic area at the high point.

Geologically, the hill sits in the Dearborn Upland, an area of high terrain in southeast Indiana that sits on top of the geologic structure known as the Cincinnati Arch. However, Hoosier Hill is located in a portion of the upland buried underneath glacial debris known as the Tipton Till Plain. As a result, while the average elevation of this upland region is 1100±100 feet above sea level, the topographic relief is gentle where the "hill" is no more than 30 feet higher than the surrounding landscape of gently rolling farmland. While the high topography seen at Brown County State Park, which sits in the Norman Upland in south central Indiana, can be mistaken to be a high point (where relief is 400–500 feet from valley to hilltop), the elevations of hilltops ranges from 800 to 1050 feet.

A.H. Marshall was the first person to successfully climb all 48 contiguous U.S. state highpoints. He completed the task in 1936 after standing atop Hoosier Hill.

According to the local government, the wooden sign with the words, "INDIANA'S HIGHEST POINT" would frequently be stolen, so in 2016 the wooden sign was permanently replaced by an engraved boulder.

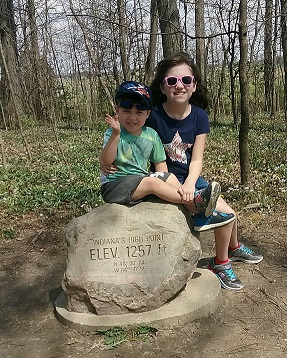
Visitors at Hoosier Hill, the highest point in Indiana

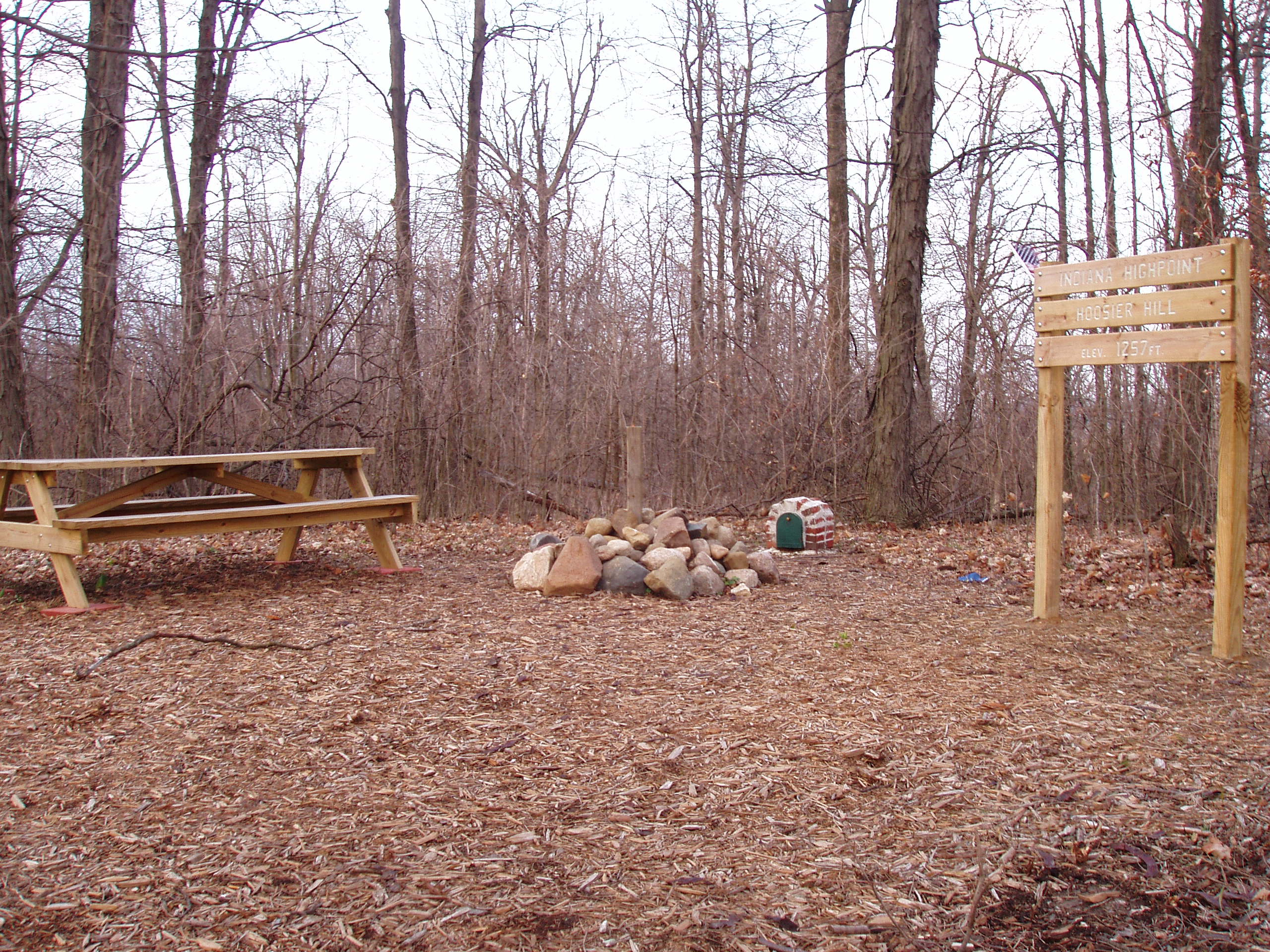
The cairn in the center marks the highpoint.

== See also ==
- Outline of Indiana
- Index of Indiana-related articles
- List of U.S. states by elevation
- Sand Hill, Indiana's second highest named point
- Weed Patch Hill, Indiana's third highest named point
