= Sandy Hill =

Sandy Hill may refer to:

== Places ==
=== Caribbean ===
- Sandy Hill, Anguilla, a district in Anguilla
  - Sandy Hill (Anguilla House of Assembly Constituency)

=== Canada ===
- Sandy Hill, Ottawa, a neighborhood in Ottawa, Ontario, Canada
- Sandy Hill, Ontario, a community within the Township of Champlain

=== United States ===
- Sandy Hill, Paterson, a neighborhood in Paterson, New Jersey, United States
- Sandy Hills, Texas, a settlement in Wilson County, Texas, United States
- Hudson Falls, New York, formerly called Sandy Hill
- Sandy Hill, Maryland, former name of Stockton

== People ==
- Sandy Hill (mountaineer) (born 1955), American mountaineer
- Sandy Hill (television personality) (born 1947), broadcast journalist

== See also ==
- Sandra Hill (disambiguation)
