= Arenophryne xiphorhyncha =

Scientific classification
- Kingdom: Animalia
- Phylum: Chordata
- Class: Amphibia
- Order: Anura
- Family: Myobatrachidae
- Genus: Arenophryne
- Species: A. xiphorhyncha

Binomial name
- Arenophryne xiphorhyncha Doughty and Edwards, 2008

Species of amphibian

Arenophryne xiphorhyncha, the southern sandhill frog, is a fossorial anuran found in a limited range of far western Australia. The only congener to A. xiphorhynca is the northern sandhill frog, Arenophryne rotunda, which was considered the sole species within the genus Arenophryne until this species was discovered about 100 kilometres from Geraldton, Western Australia, in Kalbarri National Park.
