= Southern Indiana =

Geographic and cultural region of Indiana, United States

- Region
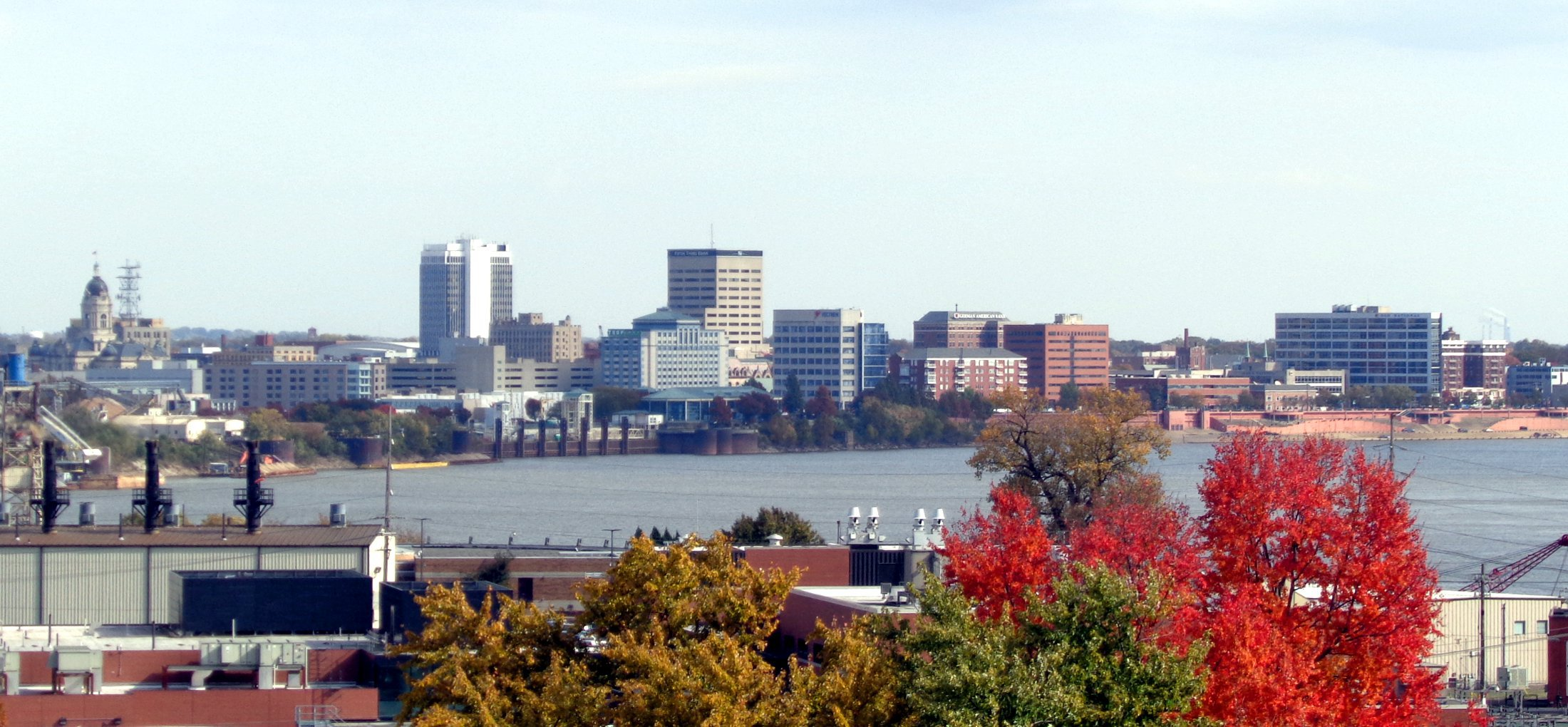
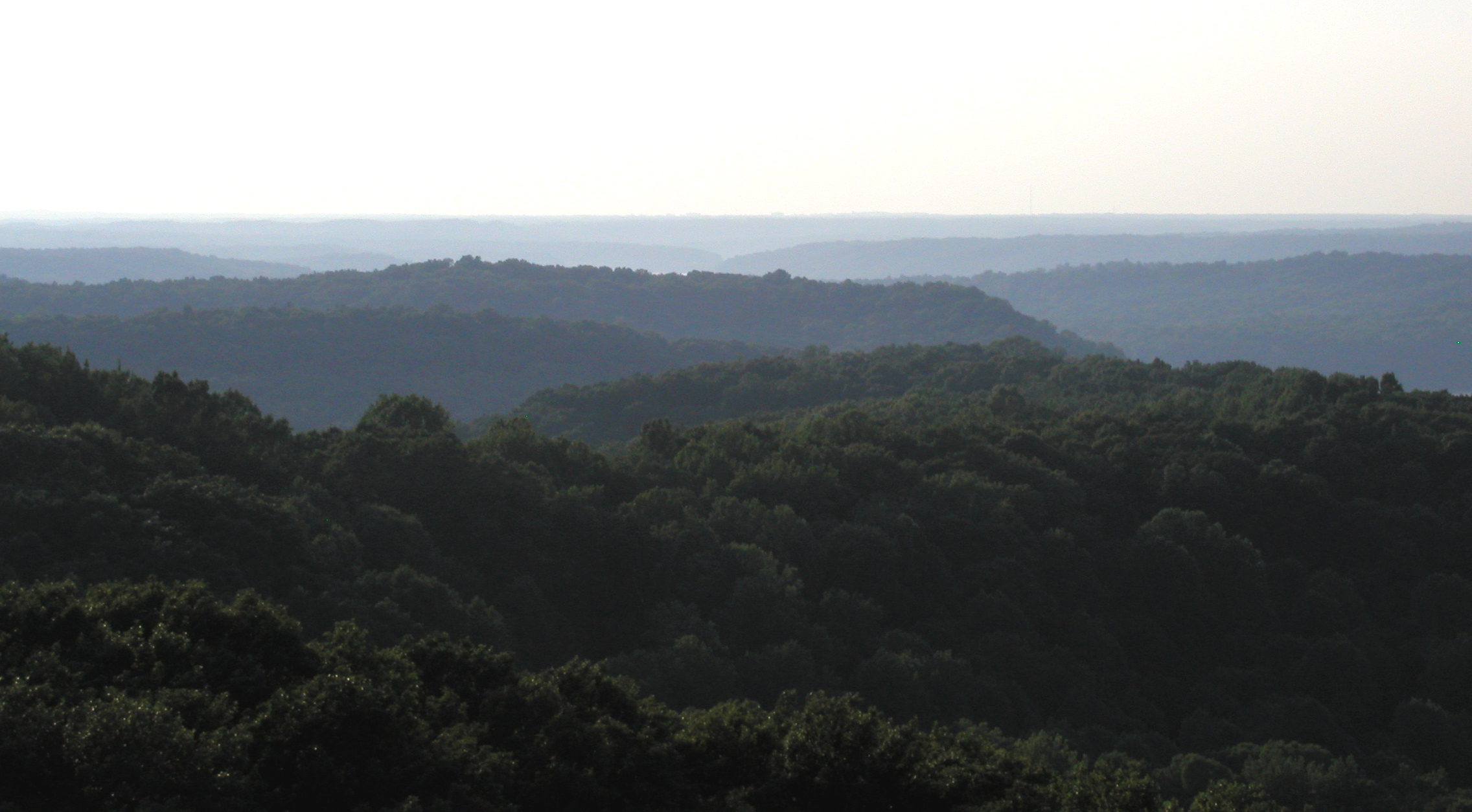
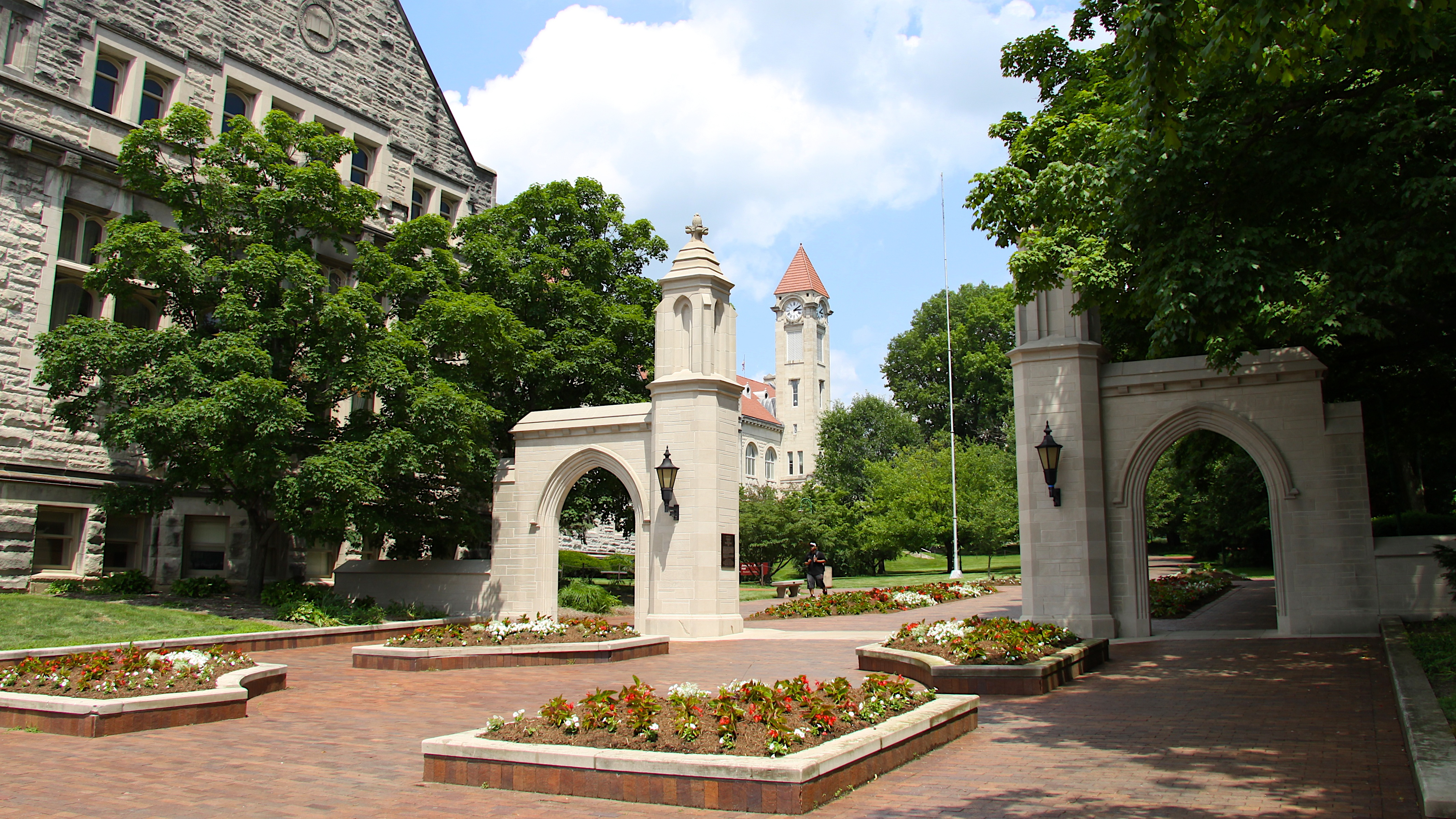
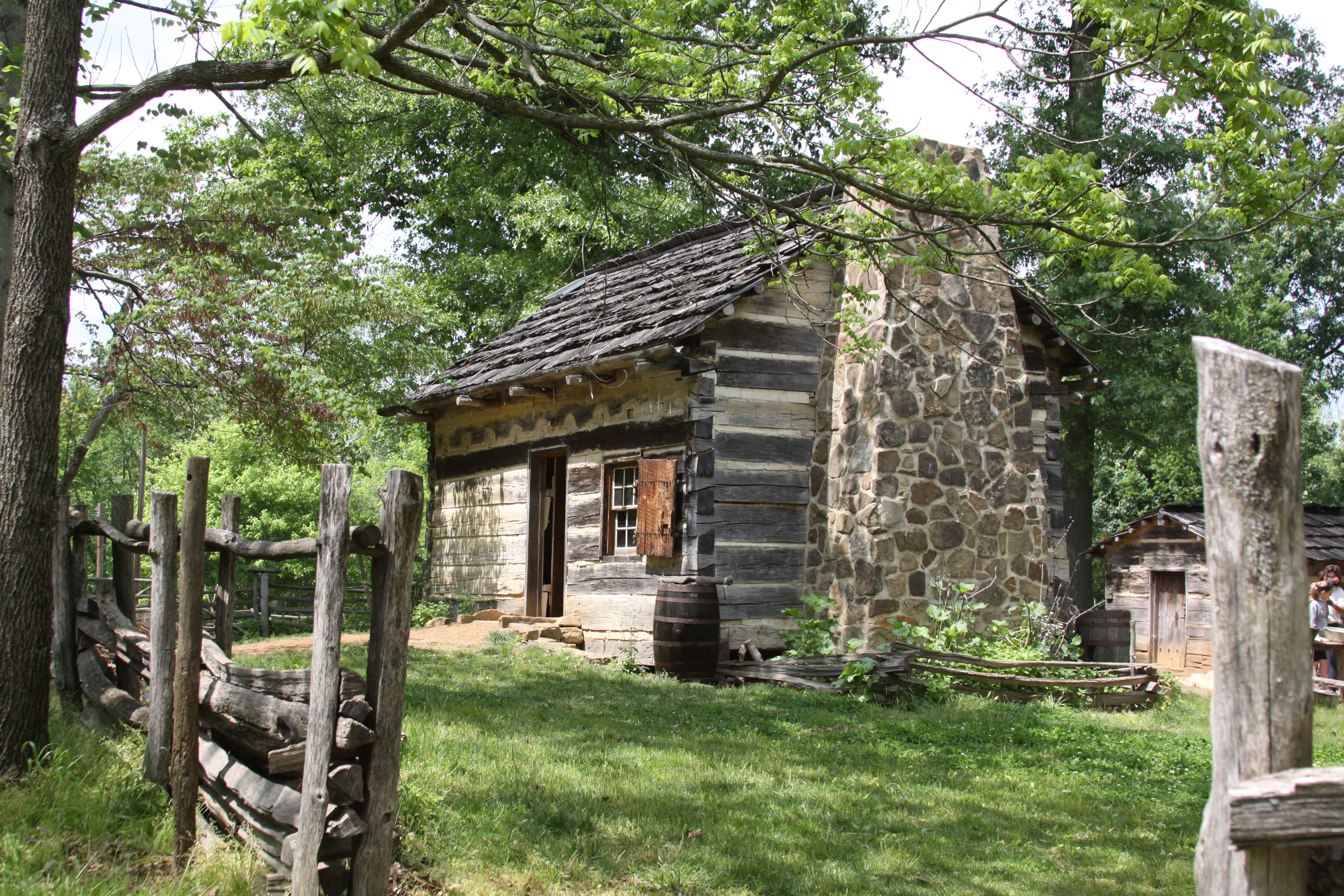
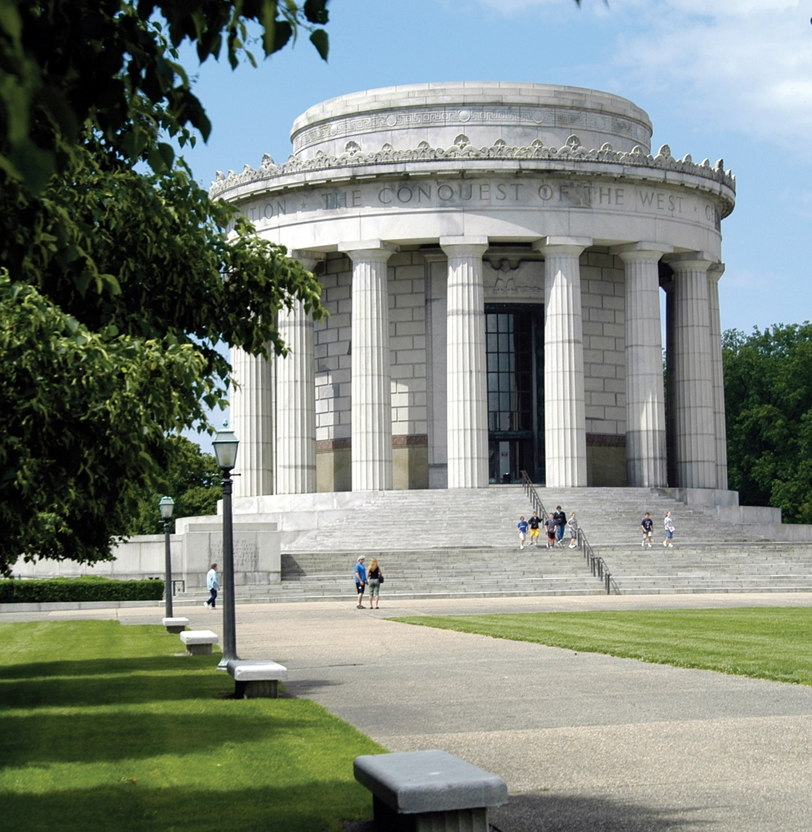
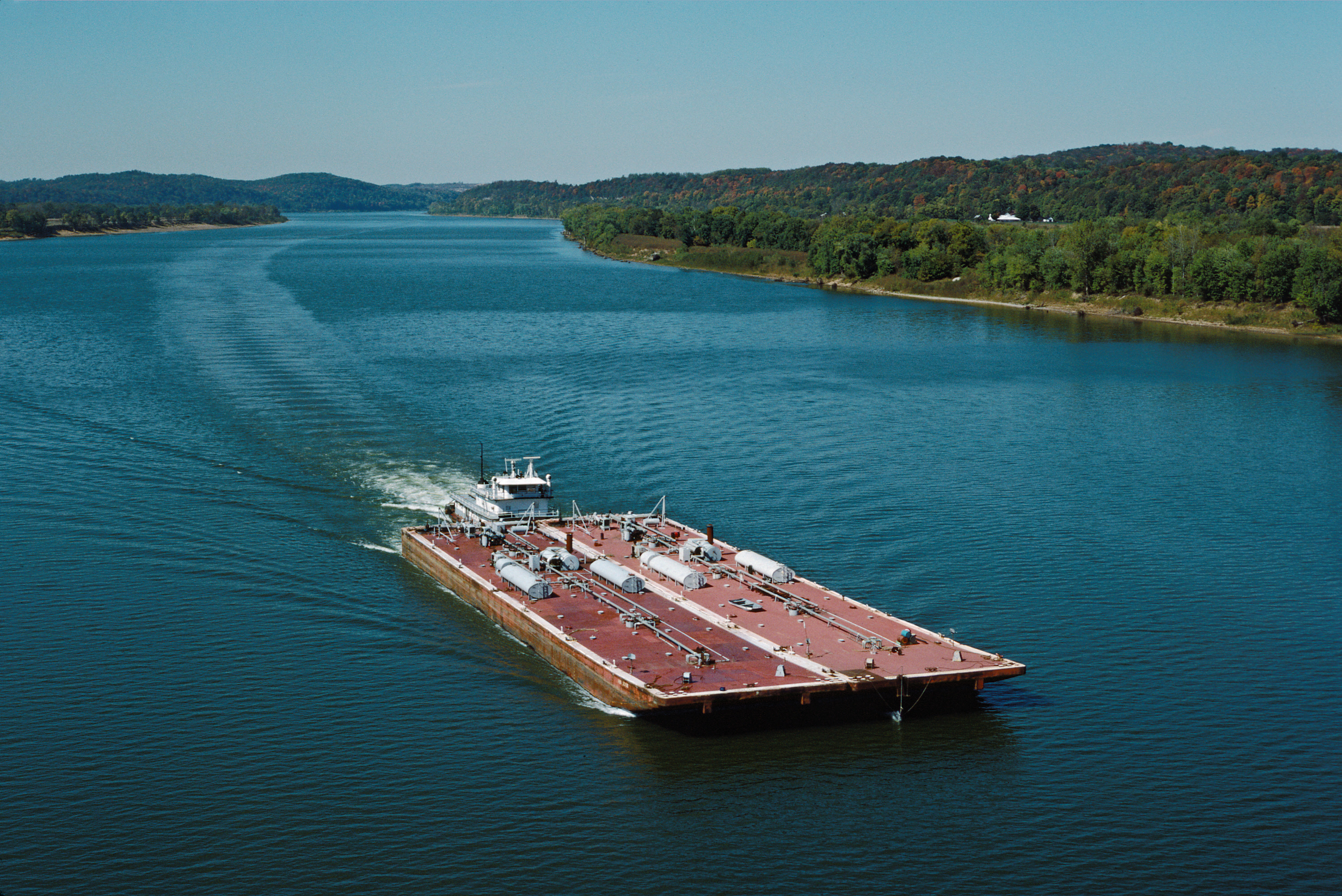
- Evansville skyline Charles C. Deam Wilderness Area in Hoosier National Forest Indiana University Bloomington Lincoln Boyhood National Memorial North Christian Church in Columbus George Rogers Clark National Historical Park Ohio River near Harrison County

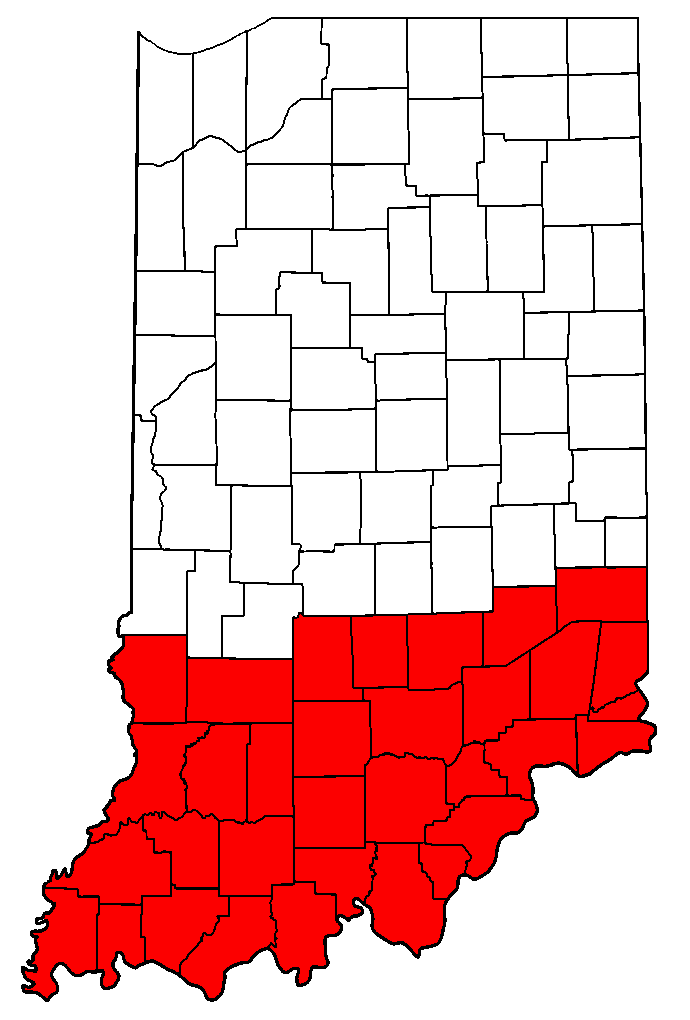
- Coordinates: 39°0′N 86°0′W

Population (2020)
  - Total: 1,386,568
- Time zones: Central
- Eastern
- Postal codes: 470–478
- Area code: 812/930

Southern Indiana is a geographic and cultural region that generally comprises the southern third of the U.S. state of Indiana and borders the states of Illinois to the west, Kentucky to the south, and Ohio to the east. Spanning the state's southernmost 33 counties, its main population centers include Southwestern Indiana (anchored by the city of Evansville), the Louisville metropolitan area (south), and the Cincinnati metropolitan area (southeast). The region's history and geography have led to a blending of Southern and Midwestern cultures, distinct from the rest of the state. It is often considered to be part of the Upland South and the Southern influenced Lower Midwest.

The Wabash forms the region's western boundary and Ohio forms the region's entire southern and the majority of its eastern boundary. Elevation ranges from around 360 feet (110 m) above mean sea level at the rivers' confluence to 1,060 feet (320 m) at the highest point in the Knobstone Escarpment. Southern Indiana's topography is considerably more varied than Central and Northern Indiana, including large tracts of forest, rolling hills, and karst caves. The region is also home to the oldest exposed Devonian fossil beds in the world at the Falls of the Ohio National Wildlife Conservation Area. Situated in the Wabash Valley seismic zone, Southwestern Indiana is at elevated risk for earthquakes.

Southern Indiana, home to about 1.4 million people, was the first area of the state to be settled by European colonists. Founded in 1732, Vincennes is the oldest continually inhabited European settlement in Indiana and served as the first capital of the Indiana Territory; Corydon would later serve as the state's first capital. Aside from Wayne County, all of the pre-statehood and most of the state's oldest counties are in Southern Indiana. Protected areas include Charles C. Deam Wilderness Area, George Rogers Clark National Historical Park, Hoosier National Forest, and the Lincoln Boyhood National Memorial. Southern Indiana is home to about a dozen higher education institutions, including Indiana University Bloomington, the flagship campus of the Indiana University system. The Catholic Church has a significant presence in the region, including Saint Meinrad Archabbey, the Monastery Immaculate Conception, and Mount Saint Francis. The region is split between the Eastern and Central time zones.

== Geography ==
=== Sub-regions ===
==== Kentuckiana ====
Kentuckiana, a portmanteau of "Kentucky" and "Indiana", is a loosely defined sub-region of the Upland South that spans north-central Kentucky and Southern Indiana's south-central counties. It is primarily centered on the Louisville metropolitan area. Counties typically considered part of the Kentuckiana sub-region include:

- Clark
- Crawford
- Floyd
- Harrison
- Jackson
- Jefferson
- Jennings
- Orange
- Scott
- Washington

==== Southwestern Indiana ====
- Daviess
- Dubois
- Gibson
- Knox
- Martin
- Perry
- Pike
- Posey
- Spencer
- Vanderburgh
- Warrick

==== Southeastern Indiana ====
- Dearborn
- Decatur
- Franklin
- Ohio
- Ripley
- Switzerland

==== South Central Indiana ====
- Bartholomew
- Brown
- Greene
- Lawrence
- Monroe
- Sullivan
- Owen

=== Time zones ===
Southwestern Indiana observes Central Time, including Posey, Vanderburgh, Warrick, Spencer, and Gibson counties. The rest of Southern Indiana observes Eastern Time.

== Dialect ==
Southern Indiana also differs from the rest of the state linguistically. Southern dialect and South Midland dialect of American English are prevalent, as opposed to the Inland North dialect in far Northern Indiana and the North Midland dialect in Central and North-Central Indiana. Southern Indiana is the northernmost extent of the South Midland region, forming what linguists refer to as the "Hoosier Apex" of the South Midland dialect.

== Educational institutions ==
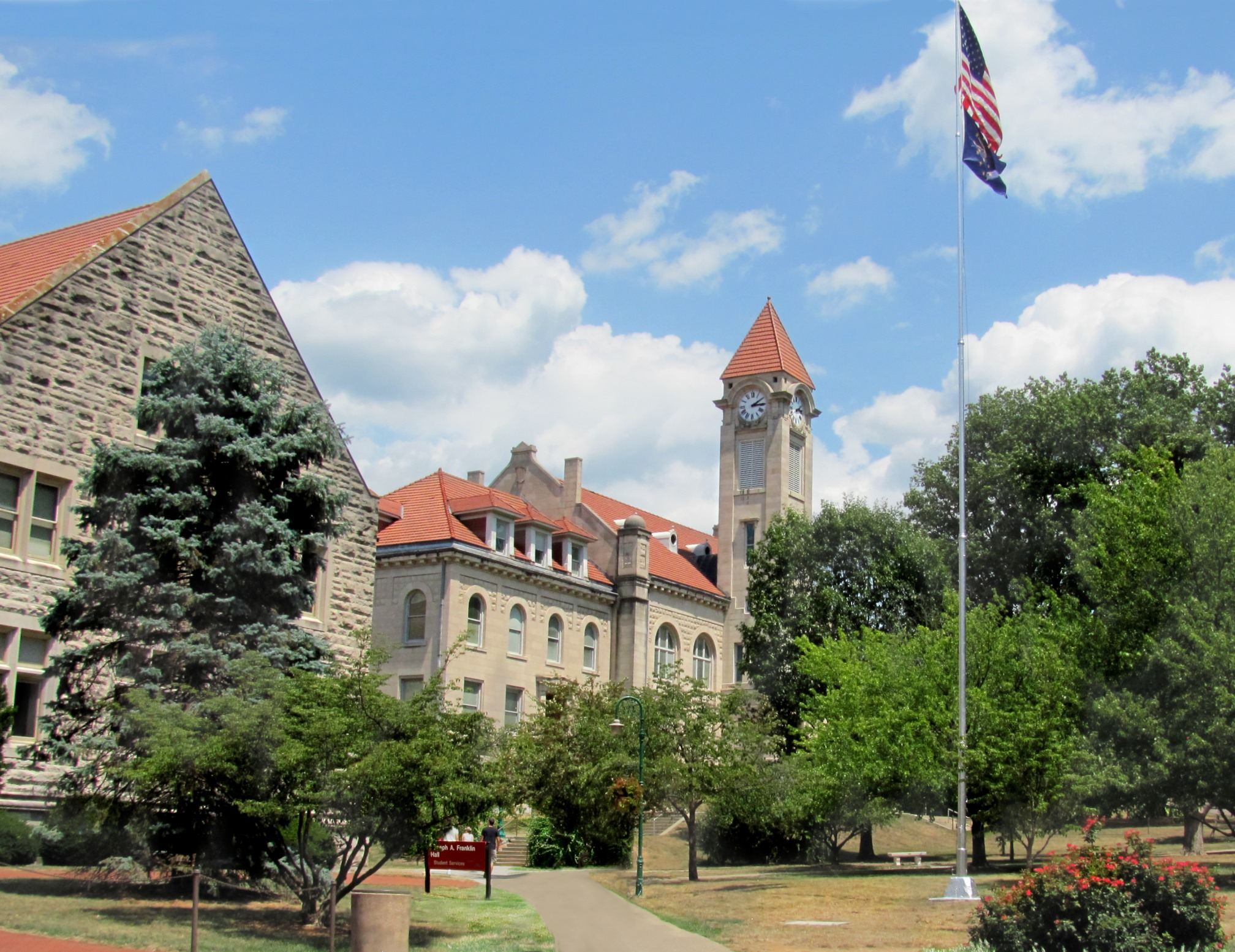
Southern Indiana is home to IU Bloomington, the flagship campus of the Indiana University system, recognized for its academics and Indiana Hoosiers athletic program.

About 12 accredited institutions of higher education are located throughout Southern Indiana, including some private, liberal arts colleges and multiple public university campuses, including the flagship campus of the Indiana University system, IU Bloomington. The "‡" symbol indicates universities with main campuses outside Southern Indiana.

=== Public ===
- Indiana University Bloomington
- Indiana University Columbus
- Indiana University Southeast
- Ivy Tech Community College (12 sites)
- Purdue Polytechnic Institute‡ (three sites)
- University of Southern Indiana
- Vincennes University

=== Private ===
- Hanover College
- Indiana Tech‡ (Jeffersonville)
- Oakland City University
- Saint Meinrad Seminary and School of Theology
- University of Evansville

== Sports ==
=== Professional sports ===
There are two professional sports teams in the region, both located in Evansville – the Evansville Thunderbolts (founded in 2018) play ice hockey, and the Evansville Otters (founded in 1995) play in baseball's independent Frontier League.

=== College sports ===
National Collegiate Athletic Association Division I

- Indiana Hoosiers
  (Monroe County)
- Evansville Purple Aces
  (Vanderburgh County)
- Southern Indiana Screaming Eagles
  (Vanderburgh County)

National Collegiate Athletic Association Division II

- Oakland City Mighty Oaks
  (Gibson County)

National Collegiate Athletic Association Division III

- Hanover Panthers
  (Jefferson County)

National Association of Intercollegiate Athletics (NAIA)

- IU Southeast Grenadiers
  (Floyd County)

National Junior College Athletic Association (NJCAA)

- Vincennes Trailblazers
  (Knox County)

== See also ==
- Southern Illinois
- Southern Ohio
- University of Southern Indiana
- Illinois–Indiana–Kentucky tri-state area
- Wabash Valley
- White Southerners
- Upland South
- Indiana White Caps
