= Knobstone Escarpment =

Geologic region in Indiana, United States

Coordinates: 39°10′01″N 86°13′02″W

The Knobstone Escarpment is a rugged geologic region in Southern Indiana. Physically, the Knobstone Escarpment is the most rugged terrain in Indiana. The highest hill in the area is Weed Patch Hill, with an elevation of 1,060 feet above sea level.

The escarpment's most prominent feature is its steep hills, often called "knobs", and ravines. Brown County State Park features views from the region's highest elevations.

This bold ridge, towering hundreds of feet above the Scottsburg Lowland to the east, extends from southern Johnson County 150 miles southward across the Ohio River into Kentucky. These scenic hills mark the easternmost extension of rocks forming the rugged country of the Norman Upland to the west. The Hills of Brown County are a well-known example of Norman Upland topography.

The Knobstone Escarpment is composed of resistant siltstones of the upper part of Borden Group rocks. Older and more easily eroded shales to the east form the Scottsburg Lowland; a thick section of soluble limestones form the undulating Mitchell Plain west of the Norman Upland.

== See also ==
- List of escarpments
