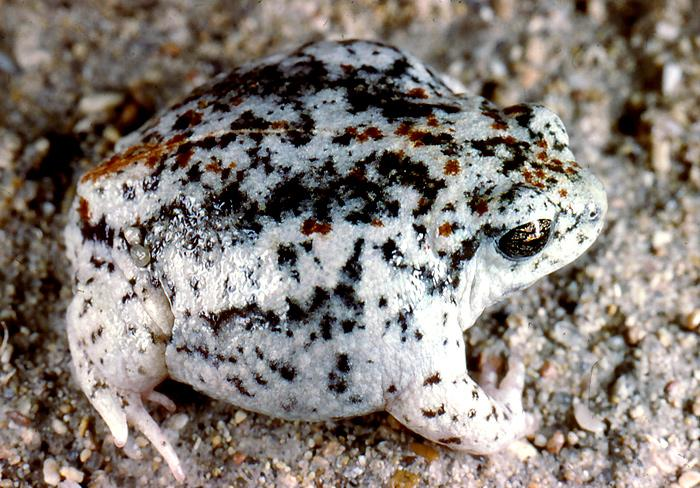
- The northern sandhill frog (Arenophryne rotunda)

Scientific classification
- Domain: Eukaryota
- Kingdom: Animalia
- Phylum: Chordata
- Class: Amphibia
- Order: Anura
- Family: Myobatrachidae
- Subfamily: Myobatrachinae
- Genus: Arenophryne; Tyler, 1976

Species
- See text
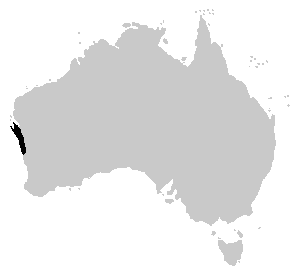
- Distribution of Arenophryne

= Arenophryne =

Genus of amphibians

Arenophryne is a small genus of Myobatrachid frogs from coastal Western Australia. Common names sandhill frogs and Australian dumpy frogs have been coined for it.

Both species live in sand dune habitat of the Shark Bay region of Western Australia. The two species were initially considered to be just one species, but a genetic analysis found the northern and southern populations to be distinct. Breeding occurs during the wetter winter months where adults call near the surface, and mate underground. The eggs are laid in a burrow and develop directly from eggs to frogs.

== Species ==
There are two species:

Common name	Binomial name
Northern sandhill frog, sandhill frog, Australian dumpy frog	Arenophryne rotunda Tyler, 1976
Southern sandhill frog	Arenophryne xiphorhyncha Doughty and Edwards, 2008
