= Brown County State Park =

State park in Indiana, United States

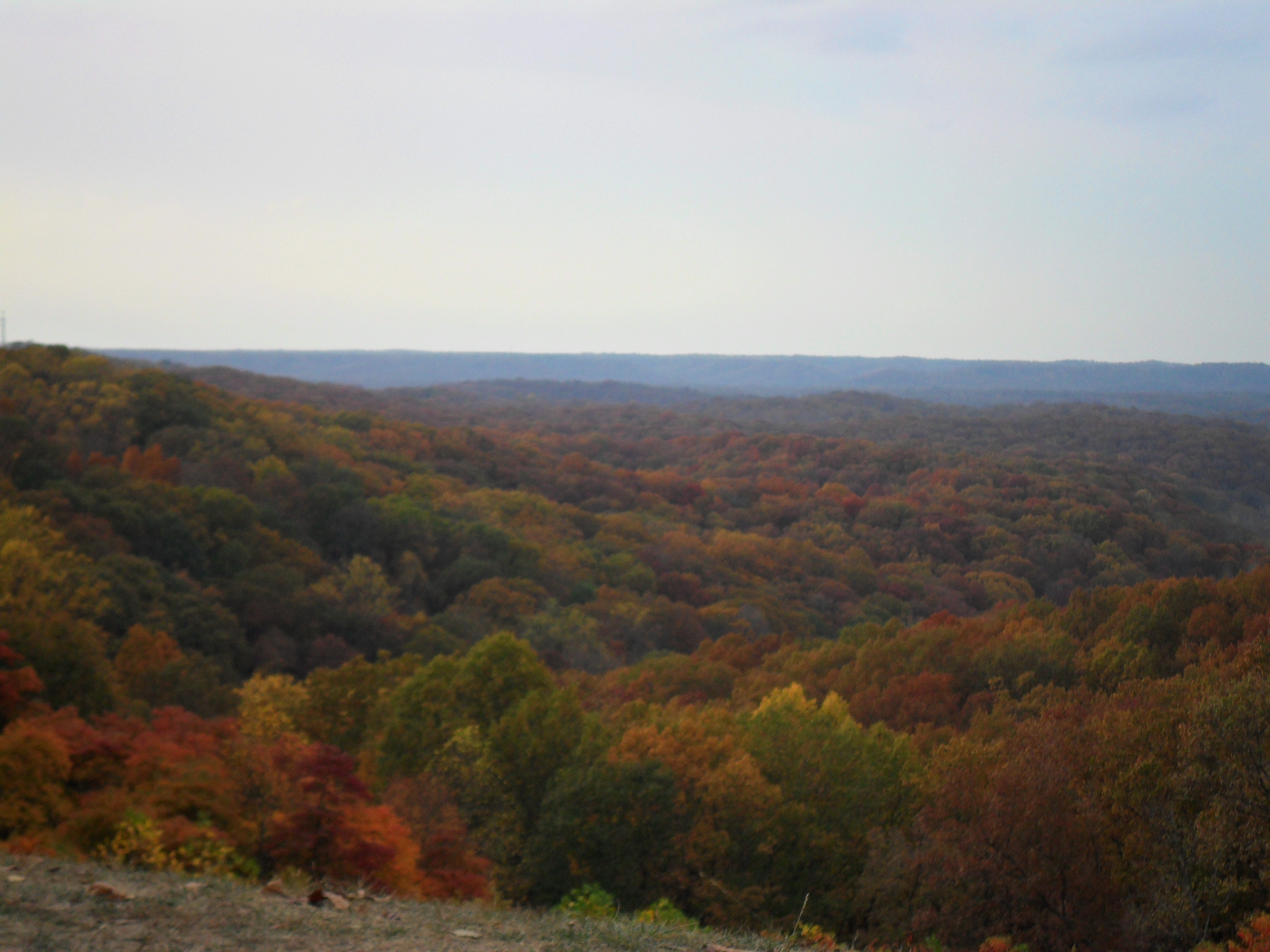
- Hesitation Point, one of several vistas in the park

- Location within Indiana
- Location: Brown County, Indiana, USA
- Nearest city: Bloomington, Indiana
- Coordinates: 39°06′49″N 86°15′53″W
- Area: 15,776 acres (63.84 km^{2})
- Established: 1929
- Visitors: 1,222,235 (in 2018–2019)
- Governing body: Indiana Department of Natural Resources

Brown County State Park is located in the United States in the center of the southern half of the state of Indiana. The park is the largest state park in Indiana, and occupies 15,776 acres (63.84 km^{2}). It is among Indiana's most visited state parks with about 1.2 million visitors annually. Although Bloomington, Indiana, is the closest city, the park is closer to the small town of Nashville in Brown County. Brown County is named for General Jacob Brown, who fought in the War of 1812 and became Commanding General of the United States Army.

The park opened in 1929, and was dedicated in 1932 as a memorial to Indiana humorist Frank McKinney "Kin" Hubbard. Although Hubbard lived and worked in Indianapolis, he was a frequent visitor to Nashville and the surrounding woods. The park's Abe Martin Lodge is named after Hubbard's fictional backwoodsmen character used to convey Hubbard's humor and witticisms.

Brown County and its park are known for their scenic views of the hills of southern Indiana. Both are the home of a wide variety of trees that attract visitors each year when the vegetation transforms to its autumn colors. The park also contains many trees that flower in the springtime. Visitors will find a rustic atmosphere, enhanced by an infrastructure that was mostly constructed by the Civilian Conservation Corps during the 1930s. In addition to the park's lodge, cabins can be rented and campsites are available. The park has trails for hiking, biking and horseback riding. It has two lakes for fishing that complement the surrounding forests and provide a water source for the local wildlife. The area's beauty attracts artists and photographers worldwide.

== History ==
=== Brown County ===
Brown County was created in 1836 from portions of Monroe, Jackson, and Bartholomew counties, and is named after General Jacob Brown, a hero of the War of 1812. Early settlers tried farming in Brown County's hilly woodlands, leading them to clear the forests. Beginning in the 1840s and continuing for the rest of the century, most of Brown County's forests were cleared. At first, the largest trees were cut for lumber used in the construction industry. In later years, smaller trees were cleared for furniture wood, barrels, railroad ties, and firewood. The rugged land eventually became difficult to farm because of poor quality soil. A combination of poor farming practices and erosion caused by deforestation depleted the soil's nutrients. Many farmers abandoned the area.

=== Beginning ===
At least two people played major roles in the creation of Brown County State Park. Richard Lieber, an Indianapolis businessman who became the first director of the Indiana Department of Conservation, visited Brown County in 1910. Lieber was so impressed with the beauty of the land that he built a cabin near Nashville and suggested that a portion of the county should be set aside for a state park. Lieber eventually became known as "the father of Indiana's state parks", and the state opened 10 state parks (including Brown County) during his tenure as director of the Indiana Department of Conservation. Lieber was not the only one from Indianapolis that was impressed with Brown County. In 1923, the Order of Elks expressed interest in establishing a state park in Brown County.

Lee Bright lived in the small Indiana town of Nashville in Brown County. Bright believed that creation of a state park would restore the economic health of the region through tourism. His idea proved difficult to accomplish, since Indiana law did not allow purchasing land for a state park using state funds. The law did allow funds to be used for a game preserve. (Note: The terms "reserve" and "preserve" were used interchangeably by newspapers to describe the state's land in Brown County. For example, the Kokomo Tribune used "reserve" in 1925, while the Tipton Tribune called it a game "preserve" in 1927.) By 1926, Bright, working as the state's agent, purchased enough land to start a game reserve in Brown County.

=== Game preserve ===
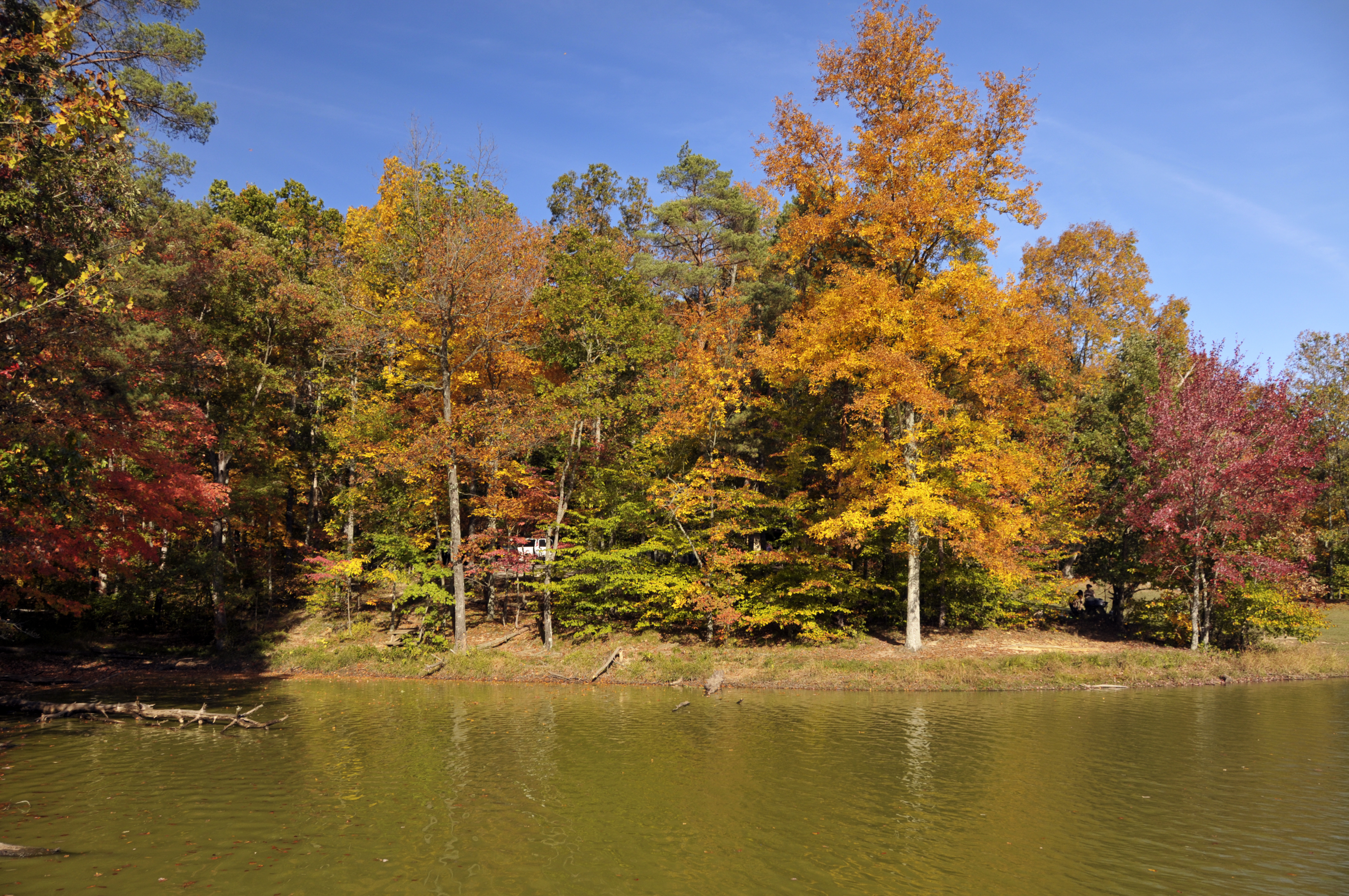
The shore of Brown County State Park's Ogle Lake.

Brown County's game preserve was created in late 1924. (Note: A timeline web page for the Indiana Department of Natural Resources says that in 1924, "Brown County State Game Preserve was opened to the public..." and "a ranger is assigned". However, the Department of Natural Resources did not control any game preserves at the end of its fiscal year 1924 (September 30, 1924), and controlled only 4,473 acres (1,810 ha) in the entire state. In November 1924, a game warden was appointed custodian of the preserve. The game reserve was announced in newspapers in 1925.) During November, 1924, the Indiana Department of Conservation appointed a game warden to manage the preserve. The new manager was a resident of Nashville, and familiar with the area. It was also announced that much of the land would be reforested. A total of 7,680 acres (31.1 km^{2}) of Brown County land was designated for the propagation of wildlife. Plans were made to surround the reserve with wire fencing, and game wardens patrolled the area. Deer and small game were brought in to propagate. Additional acreage was added in 1927, increasing the reserve to over 10,000 acres (40 km^{2}). During the same year, an observation tower was constructed on Weed Patch Hill, the highest point in the area. A dam was constructed in 1928 to create an artificial lake that was expected to cover 10 to 15 acres (4.0 to 6.1 ha). It was planned to stock the lake with game fish then allow fishing after two or three years. The lake was completed by the spring of 1929, and plans were announced to build a second (and larger) lake. By January 1929, the preserve covered about 12,000 acres (49 km^{2}). Funds from the sale of hunting and fishing licenses were used to acquire the additional land.

=== State Park ===
In 1927, the Indiana state legislature passed a law allowing county commissioners to acquire land for the purpose of establishing a state park, and donate the land to the state conservation department. Brown County State Park was the fourth such park established after this legislation. In 1929, Brown County commissioners gave the state conservation department 1,129 acres (4.57 km^{2}) of land adjacent to the Brown County Game Preserve for the creation of a state park. Four parks had been donated using other means before the legislation, making Brown County State Park Indiana's eighth state park.

In 1933, eleven Civilian Conservation Corps groups were established for Indiana's state forests, game preserves, and state parks. Each group had 200 workers involved in the construction of buildings, bridges, trails, roads, and water supplies. One project was a large shelter in the Brown County game preserve. After training, workers from the Corps arrived in Brown County in 1934. The Corps began constructing much of the park's extant infrastructure. They worked to prevent erosion by reforesting with walnut, pine, and spruce trees. A second camp for the Civilian Conservation Corps opened in the park in 1938. The CCC Trail—the park's Trail 2—is one built by the Corps. The park was listed on the National Register of Historic Places in 2020 for its CCC elements.

Beginning in 1941, the Brown County Game Preserve and Brown County State Park were unified as a single state park. Since that time, two portions of the park have been designated as nature preserves—giving them additional protection from development. Ogle Hollow Nature Preserve was established in 1970 and consists of 41 acres (17 ha) in Ogle Hollow containing the rare yellowwood tree. The second preserve is the 3,349-acre (13.55 km^{2}) Ten O'Clock Line Nature Preserve. This preserve was designated in 2010, and is Indiana's largest. It also contains yellowwood trees, and is the home of some of Indiana's deep forest species, including the red bat, timber rattlesnake, and broad-winged hawk. The term "Ten O'Clock Line" refers to a treaty with the Miami Indians from the early 1800s.

The 1987 Pan American Games, hosted in Indianapolis (roughly 50 miles (80 km) north), utilized Brown County State Park as the venue for the road race cycling competition.

=== Kin Hubbard ===
Frank McKinney "Kin" Hubbard (1868 – 1930) was an American humorist-cartoonist whose humor and witticisms were expressed through fictional backwoods characters living in Brown County. His work (usually a cartoon and a sentence or two) appeared every day on the back page of the Indianapolis News, and was syndicated in about 200 newspapers throughout the country. Hubbard was named to the Ohio Journalism Hall of Fame in 1939, and the Indiana Journalism Hall of Fame in 1967.

In 1932, Brown County State Park was dedicated in honor of Kin Hubbard. Abe Martin was Hubbard's main character, and Brown County State Park's Abe Martin Lodge is named in his honor. A picture of Hubbard hangs in the lounge of the lodge, and a collection of Hubbard memorabilia is in a room nearby.

== Description ==
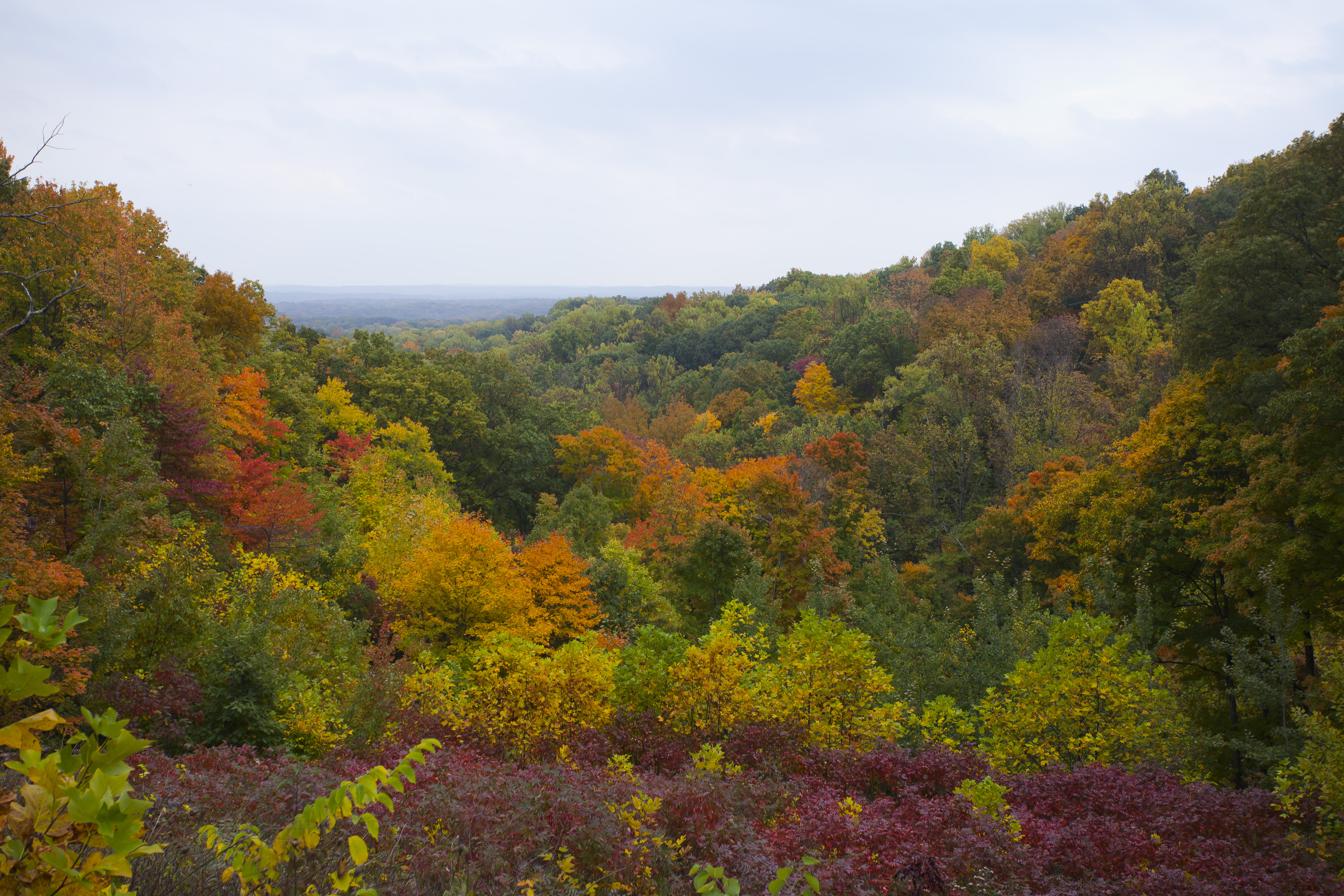
Fall foliage at Brown County State Park

According to the Indiana Department of Natural Resources, Brown County State Park is Indiana's largest state park. It is in the center of Indiana's southern half, "just minutes" from the town of Nashville, Indiana. The park occupies 15,543 acres (6,290 ha) in Brown County. It has three entrances, adjacent to state roads 46 and 135. The northern entrance is close to the Abe Martin Lodge, Saddle Barn, tennis courts and a swimming pool. Large trucks and recreational vehicles must use the western entrance, due to a historic covered bridge that has a 3-ton weight limit and a 9' overhead clearance at the northern entrance. Campers bringing horses must use the southeast entrance, which leads to a specialized campground with hitching posts known as the Horsemen's Camp. Interstate 65's Columbus exit is about 13 miles (21 km) east of the park. Indiana University and the city of Bloomington, Indiana, are less than 20 miles (32 km) away.

Brown County is nationally known for its outdoor scenery and dramatic views from southern Indiana hilltops. Brown County State Park affords a number of vistas that overlook wide swaths of deciduous forest that display a large array of colors in the fall. Peak visitation is in the fall during the leaf-changing season. In spring the dogwood, redbud, and serviceberry trees are in bloom. About 1.2 million people come to the park each year, including overseas visitors.

Brown County State Park is sometimes called "the Little Smokies" because of similarities with the Great Smoky Mountains. Activities available in the park include camping, fishing, biking, hiking, and seasonal horseback riding. Many of these activities are available all year. Overnight visitors may stay in the campgrounds, rental cabins, or the Abe Martin Lodge. The park has a nature center and a nature preserve. Within the park boundaries are two manmade lakes: the 17-acre (6.9 ha) Ogle Lake, and 7-acre (2.8 ha) Strahl Lake. The park contains nine mountain bike trails totaling 25 miles (40 km). Four of the trails are rated as beginner trails, two are considered intermediate, and two advanced. The last trail is rated for experts and is 4.1 miles (6.6 km) long. A total of slightly over 9 miles (14 km) of hiking trails range from easy to rugged terrain. The park has over 20 miles (32 km) of roads and 70 miles (110 km) of bridle trails. The third highest point in Indiana is located on Trail 10 near a 100 feet (30 m) high fire tower. This point, known as Weed Patch Hill, has an elevation of 1,060 feet (320 m). When settlers first arrived at this hill, they found only a patch of weeds—a tornado had destroyed the trees—leading to the name. Hesitation Point is another vantage point for scenic views.

== Natural resources ==
=== Flora ===
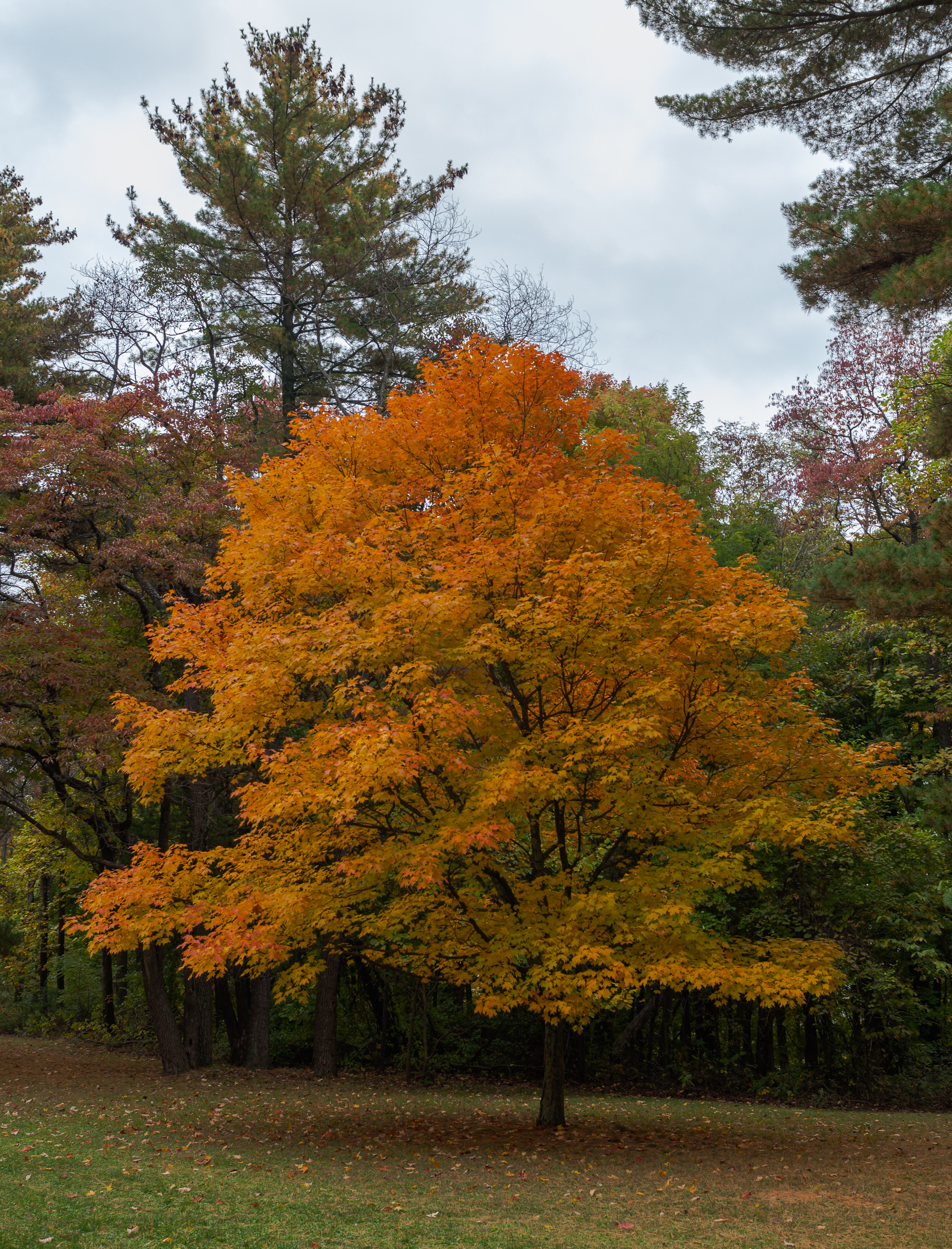
October in Brown County State Park

The most important tree in the park is the American yellowwood (Cladrastis kentukea, formerly known as Cladrastis lutea). This tree typically does not grow further north than central Kentucky, and has been designated as a state threatened species in Indiana. Other trees found in the park include at least four types of oak (black, chestnut, red, and white) and three types of hickory (bitternut, pignut, and shagbark). The park also contains at least two types of maple trees: black, sugar, red and silver. Patches of paw paw trees can be found throughout the park, and these trees produce an edible fruit. In areas with good moist soil, the black walnut tree grows. Among other trees growing in the park are the American beech, basswood, black cherry, black gum, and red elm. Also the sassafras, sycamore, white ash. The park also contains at least eight kinds of ferns and 20 types of wildflowers, including bloodroot and wild geranium.

=== Fauna ===
Mammals typically found in Brown County State Park include white-tailed deer, bobcats, opossum, eastern gray squirrels, and chipmunks. The larger sycamore trees are sometimes the home of raccoons and flying squirrels. Red bats live in the park's Ten O'Clock Line nature preserve. Other animals include the American toad, the eastern box turtle, the spotted salamander, and the red-backed salamander. Two species of venomous snakes are native to the park: the timber rattlesnake and the copperhead. The two lakes contain bass and bluegill.

The park has good bird viewing areas along the trails, near the two lakes, and at the Nature Center. The hooded warbler, pileated woodpecker, and ruffed grouse nest in the park. Goldfinches and northern cardinals can be seen at feeders near the Nature Center. The pileated woodpecker, Acadian flycatcher, eastern wood pewee, white-breasted nuthatch, wood thrush, and yellow-billed cuckoo can all be observed in the park's Ogle Hollow Nature Preserve. Owls and woodpeckers are known to occupy sycamore trees. The cerulean warbler, whippoorwill, and broad-winged hawk all live in the Ten O'Clock Nature Preserve. Wild turkeys can be seen (and heard) along the park's Trail 10, known as the Fire Tower Trail. Other bird species in the park include the blue jay, the crow, the junco, the white-breasted nuthatch, and the robin.

=== Geology ===
Glaciers from the most recent ice ages did not reach south far enough to flatten the land in Brown County, though glacier meltwater helped deepen gullies in the region, and made hills steeper. Brown County State Park's Weed Patch Hill is the highest point in the area, at 1,058 feet (322 m) above sea level. The region is part of the Knobstone Escarpment land form, which consists of steep hills and valleys located between northern Brown County and the Ohio River. The rocks in this area contain significant amounts of silica, and were part of a large delta system over 330 million years ago. Brown County's rocks are part of the Borden Group, and are mostly siltstone. Limestone, dolomite, and chert are the Borden Group's secondary rocks.

=== Climate ===
The Brown County area has a humid subtropical climate, classified as "Cfa" in the Köppen climate classification system. Precipitation is somewhat evenly distributed throughout the year, and temperatures can be relatively high. The record high temperature over the last 99 years for county seat Nashville is 102 °F (39 °C). The record low over the last 99 years is −17 °F (−27 °C). May is the month with the most precipitation, and February has the least. Most of the area's snowfall occurs in December, January, and February.

Climate data for Nashville, Indiana (in Brown County)
Month	Jan	Feb	Mar	Apr	May	Jun	Jul	Aug	Sep	Oct	Nov	Dec	Year
Record high °F (°C)	74 (23)	69 (21)	88 (31)	95 (35)	95 (35)	102 (39)	101 (38)	100 (38)	101 (38)	90 (32)	80 (27)	68 (20)	102 (39)
Mean daily maximum °F (°C)	43 (6)	42 (6)	52 (11)	67 (19)	76 (24)	84 (29)	89 (32)	86 (30)	79 (26)	70 (21)	55 (13)	43 (6)	66 (19)
Mean daily minimum °F (°C)	24 (−4)	21 (−6)	30 (−1)	42 (6)	51 (11)	59 (15)	63 (17)	62 (17)	55 (13)	45 (7)	35 (2)	25 (−4)	43 (6)
Record low °F (°C)	−14 (−26)	−12 (−24)	−6 (−21)	18 (−8)	29 (−2)	35 (2)	46 (8)	37 (3)	26 (−3)	19 (−7)	5 (−15)	−17 (−27)	−17 (−27)
Average precipitation inches (mm)	3.3 (84)	2.4 (61)	3.8 (97)	4.2 (110)	4.7 (120)	4.3 (110)	4.0 (100)	3.4 (86)	3.1 (79)	2.7 (69)	3.2 (81)	2.9 (74)	42 (1,071)
Source: weatherbase

== Recreation and facilities ==
=== Places to stay ===
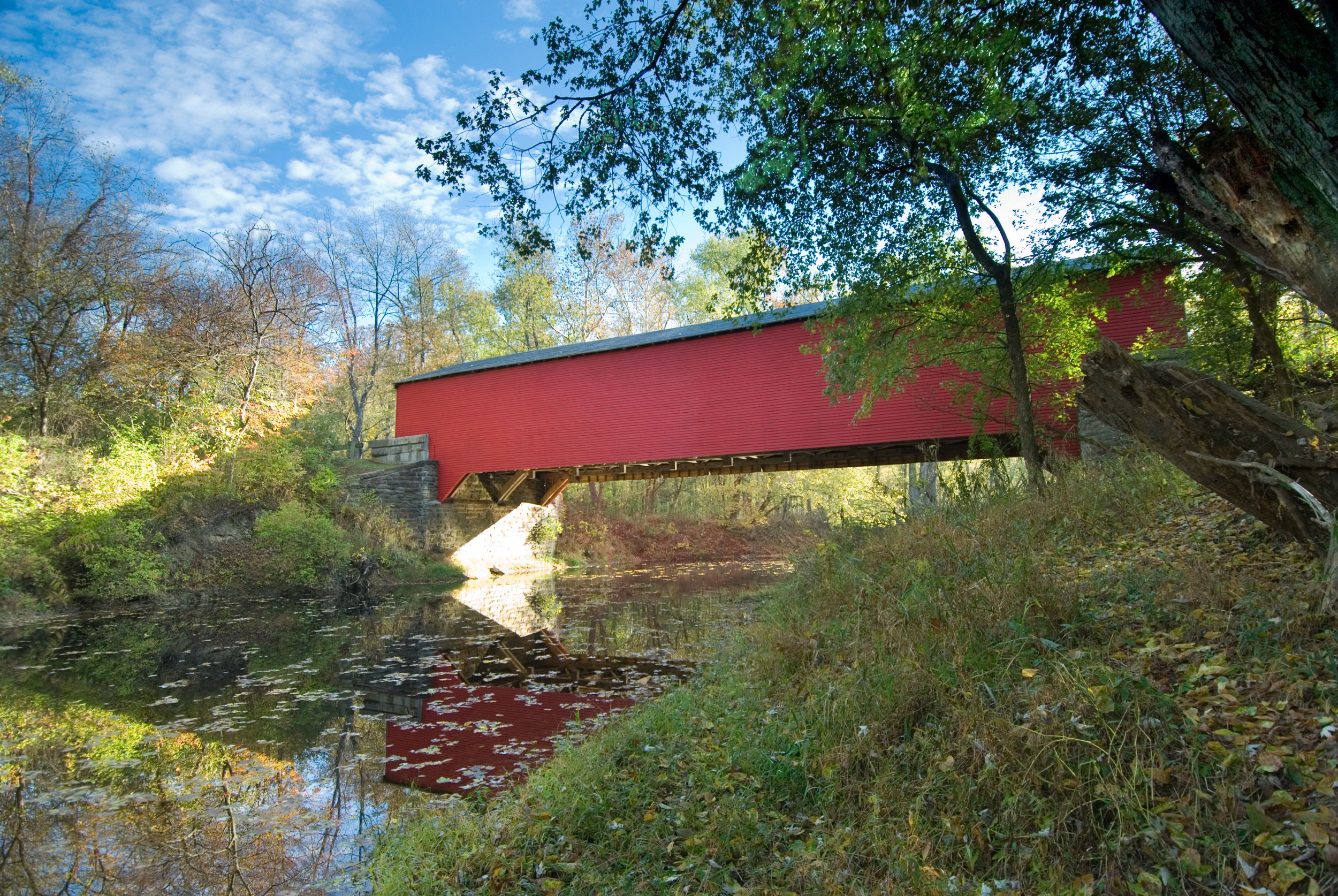
Covered Bridge at north park entrance

The park's Abe Martin Lodge, built in 1932, has 30 guest rooms, two lobbies, a gift shop, and a full-service restaurant. An annex to the lodge has 54 more rooms. An indoor water park was added recently. Rental cabins are available nearby. Each of 20 two-story family cabins can accommodate up to 8 people, and 56 rustic cabins are available. Campers have the choice of two classes of campgrounds—all with restrooms and showers. The Class A campgrounds have electrical hook-ups, while the Class B do not. A horseman's campground is available with one portion having electrical hook-ups, showers, and toilets—while the other portion is more primitive.

=== Activities ===
Sight seeing, birdwatching, mountain biking, fishing, hiking and horse riding are all popular activities at Brown County State park. The park is one of fourteen Indiana State Parks that was in the path of totality for the April 8, 2024, solar eclipse. The total eclipse lasted three minutes and fifty–four seconds. The park has over 35 miles (56 km) of mountain bike trails, including trails endorsed by the International Mountain Bicycling Association and Bike Magazine. Four beginner trails are 1.2 miles (1.9 km) to 3.5 miles (5.6 km) long. The expert trail is 4.1 miles (6.6 km) long. During July 2018, Bicycling magazine named Brown County one of "The Top 6 Secret Mountain Bike Destinations in the US", and listed the park's recently completed Hobbs Hollow as a must-ride trail.

Fishing is available at two lakes to holders of a state fishing license. Bass and bluegill are stocked at Ogle Lake and the smaller Strahl Lake. Rowboats and electric trolling motors are permitted on Ogle Lake to holders of an Indiana Department of Natural Resources lake permit. Boats are not allowed on Strahl Lake. Licenses and permits are available at the park office, and bait at the park's country store.

The park has 12 hiking trails that total over 18 miles (29 km). These trails can be used to access places of interest in the park, including the two lakes, the Ogle Hollow Nature Preserve, Hesitation Point, and lookout towers. The CCC Trail is a moderate difficulty 2-mile (3.2 km) trail built by the Civilian Conservation Corps. This trail "crosses over impressive stone bridges, stairways, and retaining walls and passes by the Lower Shelter and the North Lookout Tower, both CCC projects".

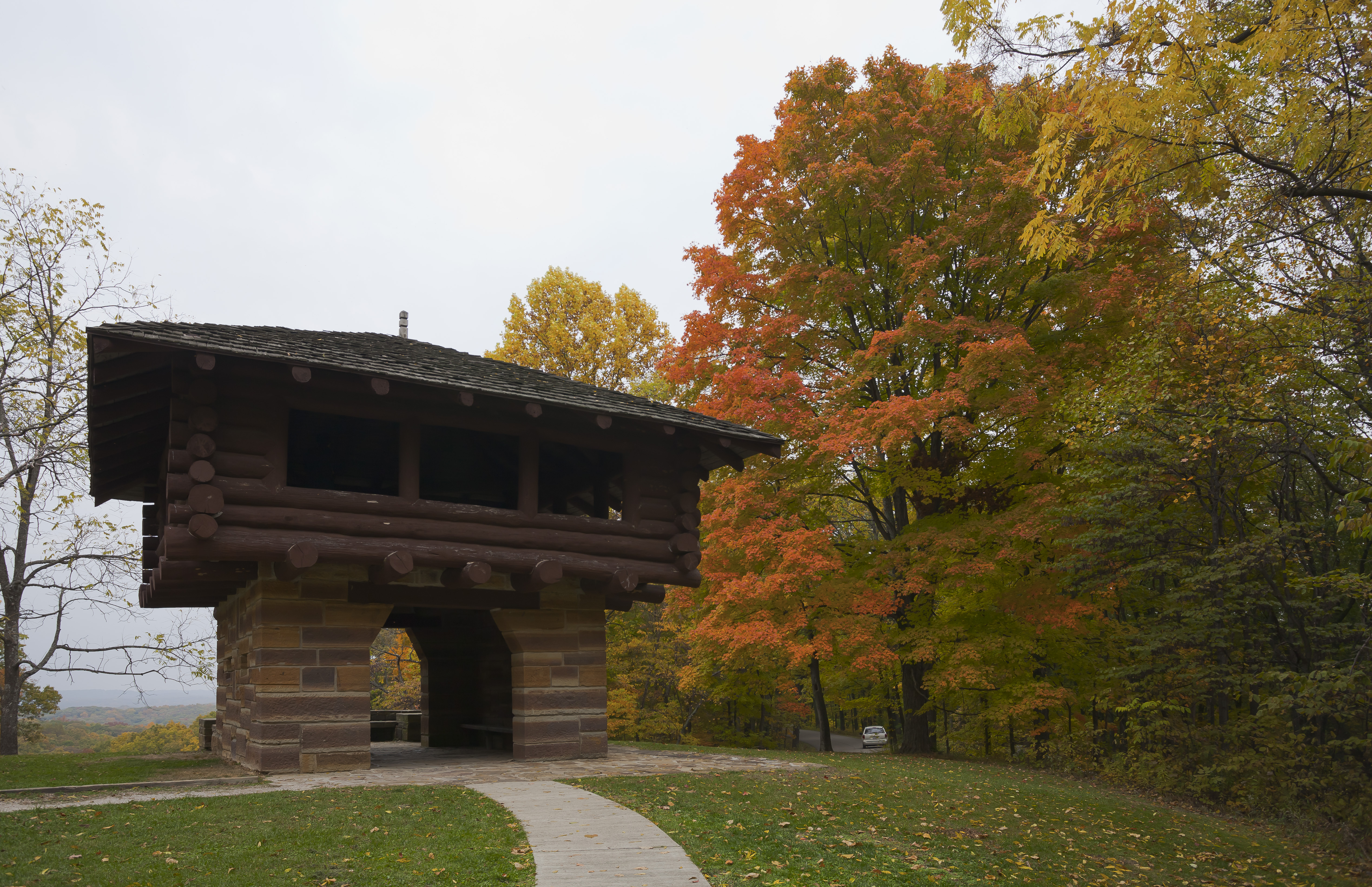
An observation tower in Brown County State Park

Horseback riding is one of the fastest growing forms of recreation. Brown County State Park has over 20 horse trails, and 11 are wide enough that riders can ride two abreast. These trails range from 0.3 miles (0.48 km) to nearly 12 miles (19 km) in length. Horseback riders have their own entrance to the park, in the park's southeast corner, which leads to the horsemen's campground—also in the southeast of the park. There are facilities typical of the park's regular and primitive campgrounds and hitch rails. A maximum of six horses per campsite is allowed, and horse permits are mandatory. On the other side of the park, a saddle barn is open from late March through October. Trail rides with a guide, pony rides, and hayrides are available. The barn is located on the north side of the park, not far from the Abe Martin Lodge.

Winter sports include cross-country skiing, sledding, and ice fishing. Cross-country skiing can be done in open fields within the park, though the park does not maintain any trails specifically for skiing, and does not rent ski equipment. Some hills suitable for sledding are located near the park's swimming pool. Ice fishing is allowed at both lakes for those with a state fishing license. Roads to the lakes sometimes closed due to ice or snow.

=== Other facilities ===
A country store is open during the warm season with food, firewood, souvenirs, and bait for fishing. The nature center has a bird observation window and nature exhibits. The country store and nature center are located in the southern portion of the park. A swimming pool and tennis courts are located on the north side near the Abe Martin Lodge. The Olympic-size swimming pool is open from Memorial Day to no later than Labor Day. The park has at least 10 picnic areas, with tables and grills and some with nearby playgrounds and toilet facilities. Picnic shelters can be reserved for fees that vary by shelter.

== Notes and references ==
=== Cited works ===
- Geary, James (2007). Geary's guide to the world's great aphorists. New York, NY: Bloomsbury. ISBN 978-1-59691-788-0. OCLC 871068693.
- Hubbard, Kin; Hawes, David S. (1995). The best of Kin Hubbard: Abe Martin's sayings and wisecracks, Abe's neighbors, his almanack, comic drawings. Bloomington, IN: Indiana University Press. ISBN 978-0-25321-007-4. OCLC 36532640.
- Keller, Charles E.; Keller, Shirley A.; Keller, Timothy C. (1986). Indiana birds and their haunts: a checklist and finding guide. Bloomington, Indiana: Indiana University Press. ISBN 978-0-25320-382-3. OCLC 12971563.
- National Geographic Society (2011). Guide to state parks in the United States. Washington, D.C.: National Geographic Society. ISBN 978-1-42620-889-8. OCLC 785724548.
- Werner, Nick (2012). Best Hike Near Indianapolis. Guilford, CT: FalconGuides. ISBN 978-0-76279-496-6. OCLC 841493778.
- Wissing, Douglas (1999). Scenic Driving Indiana. Falcon Creek Publishing Company. ISBN 978-1-56044-906-5. OCLC 248503778.
