= Sand Hill, Kentucky =

Sand Hill may refer to:

- Sand Hill, Harlan County, Kentucky, on Kentucky Route 160
- Sand Hill, Lewis County, Kentucky, in Lewis County, Kentucky
- Sand Hill, Warren County, Kentucky, on KY 1320
- a former name for Prospect, Kentucky, in Fayette County
