= Pantheon Theatre =

American theatre

Coordinates: 38.677754°N 87.530046°W

The Pantheon Theatre was constructed in 1919 on the corner of 5th and Main Street in Vincennes, Indiana. It was built to hold 1200 people. One of the highest paid interior decorators in the world was hired to supervise the decorating of the theatre. The Pantheon's interior was highly embellished with ornamental plaster, draperies and painted details such as the birds of paradise. Over six miles of electrical wiring and 15 miles of rope for rigging was installed. With its large stage, orchestra pit, eleven dressing rooms, and fifty-two curtains and backdrops the Pantheon was the only facility in the area that could handle Broadway shows. The Pantheon featured live shows from Broadway, vaudeville, live music, cooking shows, fashion shows, and movies. At first the movies were silent and the Pantheon had a modest Wurlitzer theatre organ to play along with the silent movies. In 1929 the Pantheon showed the first "talkie" in Vincennes. The Pantheon was also the first building in Vincennes to be air-conditioned.

== Famous performers ==
The Pantheon had some of the greatest performers on its stage including Red Skelton, Duke Ellington, Count Basie, Ed Wynn, Isaac Stern, John Philip Sousa, Amos and Andy, Hank Williams, Minnie Pearl, Roy Acuff, Fay Wray, Gene Autry, Roy Rogers, James Dean, Bill Monroe, Will Rogers, Sally Rand, Marx Brothers, Red Grange, Cecil B. DeMille, Ivan Romanoff, Eileen Farrell, Spade Cooley, Blanche Thebom, David Rubinoff, Bert Williams, Edgar Bergen and Charlie McCarthy, W. C. Fields, The Diamonds, and The Kansas City Night Hawks.

== Final show ==
By the 1960s attendance started to drop and the Pantheon was in need of many repairs, so after forty years of shows, the Pantheon closed in 1961. All twelve-hundred seats were removed and the orchestra pit was filled with sand and concrete. They also hung a fake dropped ceiling throughout the entire theatre and rented the building out for almost fifty years.

== Restoration effort ==
In 2006 Travis S. Tarrants purchased the Pantheon Theatre and started a 501(c)(3) non-profit to restore the Pantheon to its original state. Tarrants was the founder and President of The Pantheon Theatre Company and was overseeing the multi-million dollar restoration of the Pantheon Theatre in Vincennes, Indiana. Tarrants was able to raise close to $300,000 for the restoration. Two years later, donations for the project plummeted. Tarrants lost the theatre to unpaid back taxes in 2012.

In 2013, the new owner was realtor Heath Klein of Klein Realty and Auction. In late 2014, Klein sold the theatre property to a Vincennes non-profit group, INVin. The organization works to bring arts and arts-related businesses into downtown Vincennes. In March 2016, the group proposed to turn the theatre into shared workspace.
