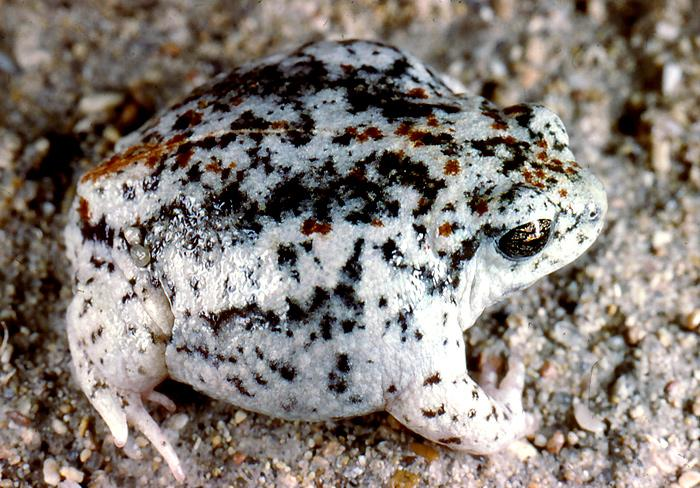

Conservation status
- Least Concern (IUCN 3.1)

Scientific classification
- Kingdom: Animalia
- Phylum: Chordata
- Class: Amphibia
- Order: Anura
- Family: Myobatrachidae
- Genus: Arenophryne (Tyler, 1976)
- Species: A. rotunda

Binomial name
- Arenophryne rotunda Tyler, 1976
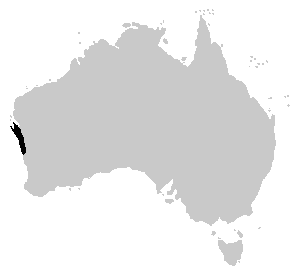
- Distribution of Arenophryne (in black).

= Sandhill frog =

Species of amphibian

The northern sandhill frog (Arenophryne rotunda) is a small, fossorial frog native to a small region of the Western Australian coast. It was formerly considered the sole species within the genus Arenophryne until the first decade of the 2000s, when a new species of frog called the southern sandhill frog was discovered about 100 kilometres from Geraldton, Western Australia in Kalbarri National Park and given the scientific name Arenophryne xiphorhyncha.

== Description ==
The northern sandhill frog is a small, rotund frog, reaching a maximum length of 33 millimetres (1.3 in). It is a burrowing frog, and has short, strong legs. The dorsal surface is mottled in colour, from dark grey and white to pale brown. It is covered in small warts and ridges. It also has small, bright red or green, patches on its back. The ventral surface is a dull white. The head is small, and triangular in shape, and the body is flat. The tympanum is not visible.

== Ecology and behaviour ==
The sandhill frogs are one of the more peculiar of the Australian ground frogs, family Myobatrachidae. Most of the Australian burrowing frogs burrow backwards; only the sandhill frog and the turtle frog (Myobatrachus gouldii) burrow head first. To achieve this, both frogs have small heads and strong arms. The sandhill frog inhabits coarse-grained sand dunes on the coast of Western Australia, ranging from Shark Bay in the north, Kalbarri National Park in the south and Cooloomia in the east. They inhabit an area which does not have much free-standing water, as it is quickly absorbed into the sand. However, the sand becomes moist at a relatively shallow depth. During the day, the sandhill frog will avoid desiccation by burrowing into the moist layer of the sand, emerging at night to hunt. (Hogan et al. 2012) Their diet primarily consists of ants.

During March and April, the males will call from above or below the surface of the sand. The male and female will burrow together. As the dry season dries out the sand, the frogs will continue to dig further to remain in the wet layer. They may reach depths of 80 centimetres (2.6 ft). They will lay a maximum of eleven eggs underground, where they undergo direct development, and bypass the tadpole stage. The adult frogs will remain underground for at least five months.
