= Sand Hill (Noble County, Indiana) =

- Location within Indiana

Highest point
- Elevation: 1070+ ft (326+ m)
- Coordinates: 41°30′51″N 85°13′30″W

Geography
- Location: Noble County, Indiana, United States
- Topo map: USGS Stroh

Sand Hill (1070+ feet or 326+ m) is the second highest named summit in the U.S. state of Indiana. It is located in northeastern Wayne Township in Noble County, approximately two and a half miles southeast of the town of South Milford. A burial ground known as Weston Chapel Cemetery is on the southeastern face of the hill.

The highest summit in Indiana is Hoosier Hill in Wayne County (1,257 feet or 383 metres)
