= Sand Hill, Wood County, West Virginia =

Sand Hill
- Unincorporated community
- Location within the state of West Virginia Sand Hill (the United States)
- Coordinates: 39°22′15″N 81°29′24″W
- Country: United States
- State: West Virginia
- County: Wood
- Elevation: 653 ft (199 m)
- Time zone: UTC-5 (Eastern (EST))
  - Summer (DST): UTC-4 (EDT)
- GNIS ID: 1555560

Sand Hill is an unincorporated community in Wood County, West Virginia, United States.
