= National Register of Historic Places listings in Jackson County, Indiana =

Location of Jackson County in Indiana

This is a list of the National Register of Historic Places listings in Jackson County, Indiana.

This is intended to be a complete list of the properties and districts on the National Register of Historic Places in Jackson County, Indiana, United States. Latitude and longitude coordinates are provided for many National Register properties and districts; these locations may be seen together in a map.

There are 21 properties and districts listed on the National Register in the county. Another property was once listed but has been removed.

Properties and districts located in incorporated areas display the name of the municipality, while properties and districts in unincorporated areas display the name of their civil township. Properties and districts split between multiple jurisdictions display the names of all jurisdictions.

This National Park Service list is complete through NPS recent listings posted August 29, 2025.

== Current listings ==
	Name on the Register	Image	Date listed	Location	City or town	Description
1	Beatty-Trimpe Farm	Beatty-Trimpe Farm	March 26, 2003 (#03000138)	4475 E. State Road 258, west of Seymour; 38°58′24″N 85°57′00″W	Hamilton Township	
2	Brownstown Courthouse Square Historic District		March 4, 2021 (#100006202)	Roughly Walnut St. between Sugar and Poplar Sts. and Main St. between Cross and Spring Sts. 38°52′44″N 86°02′30″W	Brownstown	
3	Carr High School	Carr High School	December 15, 2011 (#11000910)	10059 W. County Road 250 S., west of Medora; 38°50′18″N 86°13′25″W	Carr Township	
4	Cavanaugh Bridge	Cavanaugh Bridge	December 19, 2007 (#07001280)	0.6 miles south of County Road 700S on County Road 550W over the Muscatatuck River, southwest of Brownstown; 38°45′48″N 86°08′12″W	Driftwood Township	Extends into Washington County
5	Crothersville Independent Order of Oddfellows (IOOF) Lodge		March 4, 2024 (#100010030)	121 East Howard Street; 38°47′45″N 85°50′25″W	Crothersville	
6	Farmers Club	Farmers Club	August 11, 1983 (#83000037)	105 S. Chestnut St. 38°57′28″N 85°53′22″W	Seymour	
7	First Presbyterian Church	First Presbyterian Church	December 19, 1991 (#91001867)	301 N. Walnut St. 38°57′35″N 85°53′32″W	Seymour	
8	Jackson County Courthouse	Jackson County Courthouse	December 15, 2011 (#11000911)	111 S. Main St. 38°52′43″N 86°02′29″W	Brownstown	
9	Joseph Jackson Hotel	Joseph Jackson Hotel	June 17, 2005 (#05000610)	2420 S. Main St. in Vallonia; 38°50′39″N 86°05′52″W	Driftwood Township	
10	Low Spur Archeological Site (12J87)	Low Spur Archeological Site (12J87)	May 1, 1987 (#87000646)	Address Restricted	Jackson Township	
11	Medora Covered Bridge	Medora Covered Bridge	September 19, 2007 (#07000977)	Off State Road 235, ½ mile southeast of Medora over the east fork of the White River; 38°49′06″N 86°08′49″W	Carr and Driftwood Townships	
12	T. Harlan and Helen Montgomery House	T. Harlan and Helen Montgomery House	December 27, 2010 (#10001080)	628 N. Poplar St. 38°57′49″N 85°53′39″W	Seymour	
13	Picnic Area-Jackson State Forest	Picnic Area-Jackson State Forest	January 2, 1997 (#96001554)	Approximately 1 mile north of State Road 250 in the Jackson-Washington State Forest, southeast of Brownstown; 38°52′00″N 85°59′58″W	Driftwood Township	
14	Sand Hill Archeological Site 12J62	Sand Hill Archeological Site 12J62	September 7, 1982 (#82004914)	Address Restricted	Jackson Township	
15	Seymour Commercial Historic District	Seymour Commercial Historic District	June 9, 1995 (#95000708)	Roughly bounded by Walnut, 3rd, Ewing, and Bruce Sts. 38°57′28″N 85°53′21″W	Seymour	
16	Shields' Mill Covered Bridge	Shields' Mill Covered Bridge	June 7, 2016 (#16000330)	Shields Rd. across the East Fork of the White River; 38°54′55″N 86°00′11″W	Brownstown and Hamilton Townships	
17	Southern Indiana Railroad Freighthouse	Southern Indiana Railroad Freighthouse	June 22, 2003 (#03000541)	105 N. Broadway; 38°57′34″N 85°53′08″W	Seymour	
18	George H. Vehslage House	George H. Vehslage House	September 23, 2010 (#10000775)	515 N. Chestnut St. 38°57′45″N 85°53′32″W	Seymour	
19	Walnut Street Historic District		March 6, 2020 (#100005044)	Roughly bounded by North Chestnut, 7th and North Poplar Sts., but extending south on North Walnut St. to 3rd St. 38°57′49″N 85°53′36″W	Seymour	
20	Westside Historic District		August 31, 2020 (#100005517)	Roughly bounded by Bryant Blvd., Poplar, Maple, and 6th Sts. 38°57′35″N 85°53′50″W	Seymour	
21	Frank Wheeler Hotel	Frank Wheeler Hotel	August 9, 1991 (#91001161)	Junction of 2nd and Main Sts. at Freetown; 38°58′24″N 86°08′02″W	Pershing Township	

== Former listing ==
	Name on the Register	Image	Date listed	Date removed	Location	City or town	Description
1	Bell Ford Post Patented Diagonal "Combination Bridge"	Bell Ford Post Patented Diagonal "Combination Bridge"	March 25, 2005 (#05000194)	September 12, 2016	State Road 258, 1.5 miles west of its junction with Community Dr., and northwest of Seymour; 38°58′24″N 85°55′46″W	Hamilton and Jackson Townships	Collapsed

== See also ==
- List of National Historic Landmarks in Indiana
- National Register of Historic Places listings in Indiana
- Listings in neighboring counties: Bartholomew, Brown, Jennings, Lawrence, Monroe, Scott, Washington
- List of Indiana state historical markers in Jackson County
