= List of Indiana state historical markers in Jackson County =

Location of Jackson County in Indiana

This is a list of the Indiana state historical markers in Jackson County.

This is intended to be a complete list of the official state historical markers placed in Jackson County, Indiana, United States by the Indiana Historical Bureau. The locations of the historical markers and their latitude and longitude coordinates are included below when available, along with their names, years of placement, and topics as recorded by the Historical Bureau. There are 8 historical markers located in Jackson County.

== Historical markers ==
Marker title	Image	Year placed	Location	Topics
Fort Vallonia		1951	Southwestern corner of the junction of State Road 135 and Main Street in Vallonia; 38°50′58″N 86°5′25.4″W	Military, Early Settlement and Exploration
Indian Treaty Corner		1966	Northern side of U.S. Route 50 at Crane Cemetery, 1 mile west of Seymour; 38°56′18″N 85°55′52″W	Early Settlement and Exploration
In Memory of Col. John Ketcham 1782-1865/Time Capsule Brownstown Area Sesquicentennial October 1–8, 1966		1966	Southwestern corner of the Jackson County Courthouse grounds at the junction of Main (U.S. Route 50) and E. Cross Streets in Brownstown; 38°52′42″N 86°2′31″W	Early Settlement and Exploration, Historic District, Neighborhoods, and Towns
Freeman Field		1997	Northwestern corner of the junction of Walnut Street (State Road 11) and B Avenue E. at the eastern entrance to Freeman Field near Seymour; 38°56′20″N 85°53′24.5″W	Military
Freeman Field		1997	Southwestern corner of the junction of U.S. Route 50 and Airport Road at the northern entrance to Freeman Field near Seymour; 38°57′3″N 85°54′30″W	Military
Medora Shale Brick Plant		2008	By the State Bank of Medora at the junction of Main and Perry Streets; 38°49′31″N 86°10′12″W	Business, Industry, and Labor
Alexander McClure		2008	100 N. Broadway Street in Seymour; 38°57′33.4″N 85°53′9.2″W	[none]
Freeman Field Mutiny		2022	Freeman Army Airfield Museum, 1035 A Ave., Seymour; 38°55′31″N 85°54′26″W	Military, African American

== See also ==
- List of Indiana state historical markers
- National Register of Historic Places listings in Jackson County, Indiana
