= Westside Historic District =

Westside Historic District can refer to:

- Westside Historic District (West Point, Georgia), listed on the National Register of Historic Places
- Westside Historic District (Seymour, Indiana), listed on the National Register of Historic Places
- Westside Historic District (Amherst, Massachusetts)
