= Starve Hollow State Recreation Area =

Protected area in Indiana, United States

Starve Hollow State Recreation Area, Indiana, USA
- Location within Indiana
- Location: Jackson County, Indiana, United States
- Nearest city: Vallonia, Indiana
- Coordinates: 38°48′46.61″N 86°04′47.02″W
- Area: 280 acres (110 ha)
- Governing body: Indiana Department of Natural Resources

Starve Hollow State Recreation Area is a state recreation area in Vallonia, Indiana. The 280-acre (110 ha) recreation area was created from part of the larger Jackson–Washington State Forest. The area offers fishing, swimming, hiking, and a nature center.

Starve Hollow Lake, which is part of the area, is very shallow as a result of sediment entering the lake from nearby fields. Aquatic vegetation, such as lilly pads Nymphaeaceae and cattails among other types, covers much of the lake, especially in the northern and eastern areas of the lake. The lake is stocked with largemouth bass, bluegill and redear sunfish as well as channel catfish. The surrounding hardwood forests contain white-tailed deer, ruffed grouse, eastern wild turkey, rabbit, quail, dove, squirrel, fox, coyote, and raccoon as well as many non-game species. Bald eagles have been seen during winter in recent years when the lake is ice-free.

There are two campgrounds at Starve Hollow. The main campground offers several waterfront campsites. The other campground is west of the lake and is designed for larger recreational vehicles.

The Indiana Department of Natural Resources has announced plans to drain the lake in the fall of 2008 in order to repair the dam and to eradicate gizzard shad which are detrimental to the fishery.
