= Ketcham's Fort =

Coordinates: 38.87836°N 86.04204°W

Ketcham's fort was a 19th-century fort northeast of Fort Vallonia in Jackson County, Indiana.

== Established ==
Ketcham's fort was established around 1811 or 1812 on John Ketcham's land near the east fork of the White River for the protection of early settlers of what is now the township of Brownstown. It was said not to have the fortifications of Vallonia but served as an important outpost as did Huff's fort a bit closer to Fort Vallonia.

At the commencement of our Indian troubles, there were upward of seventy families living in The Forks, but a few weeks after Hinton's murder upward of fifty families left the country. About eighteen families were determined to remain, however, and built blockhouses and forts. John Sage and others built a fort at his place, but the principal fort was at Vallonia, Huff's Fort, higher up, and Ketchams Fort, still above and outside.

In crossing a ravine, one Indian secreted himself, while the other showed himself in plain view, within shooting distance. Zink (John Zink) stopped to shoot, but the secreted Indian fired first, giving him a mortal wound. Zink lay in his gore that rainy night; and was found by his companions next morning still alive, and brought to Ketcham's fort, where he was washed and comfortably clothed, and Dr. Lamb, of Salem, sent for.
