= Indiana State Road 135 =

Highway in Indiana

State Road 135
- SR 135 highlighted in red

Route information
- Maintained by INDOT
- Length: 138.55 mi (222.97 km)
- Existed: February 1935–present

Major junctions
- South end: KY 79 in Mauckport
- I-64 in Corydon; US 150 in Palmyra; US 50 in Brownstown
- North end: US 31 at Indianapolis

Location
- Country: United States
- State: Indiana
- Counties: Brown, Harrison, Jackson, Johnson, Marion, Washington Morgan County

Highway system
- Indiana State Highway System; Interstate; US; State; Scenic
← SR 134	→ US 136

State Road 135 (SR 135) in the U.S. state of Indiana is a road that connects Indianapolis with the Ohio River; for the most part it is a two-lane road except for near Greenwood and Indianapolis.

== Route description ==
The southern terminus is the Matthew E. Welsh Bridge on the east side of Mauckport. The bridge connects to Kentucky Route 79 in Brandenburg, Kentucky on the south side of the river.

The road runs north along rolling terrain in Harrison and Washington counties. It continues north through hilly country, passing Starve Hollow Lake State Recreation Area in Jackson County and the Brown County State Park. It then passes into the flatter terrain of Johnson and Marion counties. The northern terminus is at U.S. Route 31 on the south side of Indianapolis, about 0.5 miles (0.80 km) south of its interchange with Interstate 465.

== History ==
State Road 135 was known as State Road 35 until U.S. Route 35 was commissioned in Indiana in February 1935.

State Road 135 previously terminated a few miles farther north in the city, but was shifted down to its current northernmost location of Thompson Road when U.S. Highways and Indiana State Roads were all truncated at or rerouted around major cities onto available bypasses in the early 1990s. It followed Meridian St., Troy Ave., and ended at US 31 and SR 37 at the time (now Madison Ave.).

== Major intersections ==
County	Location	mi	km	Destinations	Notes
Meade	Brandenburg	0.00	0.00	KY 79 south – Brandenburg	Southern terminus of SR 135 at the Ohio River
Ohio River				Matthew E. Welsh Bridge	
Harrison	Mauckport	0.43	0.69	SR 11 north – Elizabeth	Southern terminus of SR 11
Harrison	Corydon	14.45	23.26	SR 62 – Dale, Corydon	
Harrison	Corydon	15.24	24.53	SR 337 – Corydon, Depauw	
Harrison	Corydon	16.15	25.99	I-64 – St. Louis, Louisville	Exit number 105 on I-65
Harrison	Jackson Township	18.81	30.27	SR 335 north – Crandall	southern terminus of SR 335
Harrison	New Salisbury	22.03	35.45	SR 64 – Depauw, Georgetown	
Harrison	Palmyra	28.53	45.91	US 150 – Fredericksburg, Greenville	
Washington	Salem	42.80	68.88	SR 60 east – Sellersburg	Southern end of SR 60 concurrency
Washington	Salem	43.61	70.18	SR 56 / SR 60 west – Paoli, Mitchell, Scottsburg	Northern end of SR 60 concurrency
Jackson	Driftwood Township	59.45	95.68	SR 235 north – Medora	
Jackson	Brownstown Township	64.80	104.29	US 50 east – Brownstown	Eastern end of US 50 concurrency
Jackson	Brownstown Township	67.86	109.21	US 50 west – Bedford	Western end of US 50 concurrency
Jackson	Brownstown Township	73.39	118.11	SR 58 west – Bedford	Southern end of SR 58 concurrency
Jackson	Freetown	74.65	120.14	SR 58 east – Columbus	Northern end of SR 58 concurrency
Brown	Washington Township	96.38	155.11	SR 46 east – Columbus	Eastern end of SR 46 concurrency
Brown	Nashville	99.46	160.07	SR 46 west – Bloomington	Western end of SR 46 concurrency
Brown	Beanblossom	104.75	168.58	SR 45 south – Bloomington	Northern terminus of SR 45
Morgan	Morgantown	112.29	180.71	SR 252 west – Martinsville	Western end of SR 252 concurrency
Johnson	Trafalgar	118.67	190.98	SR 252 east	Eastern end of SR 252 concurrency
Johnson	Union Township	121.24	195.12	SR 44 – Martinsville, Franklin	
Johnson	Bargersville	126.02	202.81	SR 144 east to I-65 – Franklin	Western terminus of SR 144
Marion	Indianapolis	138.55	222.97	US 31 – Greenwood, Indianapolis	Northern terminus of SR 135
1.000 mi = 1.609 km; 1.000 km = 0.621 mi: Concurrency terminus
