= Indian Treaty Corner =

Boundary junction and historical marker site in Jackson County, Indiana

Coordinates: 38°56.306′N 85°55.855′W

Indian Treaty Corner is the junction point of two early 19th-century Indian land-cession boundaries in Jackson County, Indiana, United States: the Grouseland Treaty line of 1805 and the Fort Wayne Treaty line of 1809, the latter known locally as the Ten O'Clock Line. The corner lies west of Seymour, near Hangman's Crossing, and is commemorated by two monuments—a 1916 county centennial marker and a state historical marker dedicated in 1968—located at Crane Cemetery on U.S. Route 50.

== Background ==
Under the Treaty of Grouseland, concluded at Vincennes on August 21, 1805, the Delaware, Miami, and other tribes ceded lands in southern Indiana Territory, establishing a boundary line that opened the surrounding area to white settlement.

On September 30, 1809, William Henry Harrison concluded the Treaty of Fort Wayne with the Potawatomi, Miami, and Delaware, securing for settlement nearly 3,000,000 acres north of the Vincennes Tract, between the Wabash River and the East Fork of the White River. The cession's northeast boundary was a line roughly 95 miles long, drawn from the mouth of Raccoon Creek on the Wabash—about twelve miles below the mouth of the Vermillion River—southeast to the boundary established by the Treaty of Grouseland. The line came to be known locally as the "Ten O'Clock Line" because it proved to be approximately the line of the shadow cast by a tree at 10 a.m.

The point at which the 1809 line meets the 1805 Grouseland line falls in Jackson County, approximately 800 feet northwest of the present marker site. The city of Seymour, platted in 1852, was laid out near the treaty corner.

== Markers ==
Two monuments stand together at the front of Crane Cemetery, on the north side of U.S. Route 50 west of Schleter Road (County Road E410N), west of Seymour near Hangman's Crossing.

The older monument was erected by the Jackson County Historical Society and dedicated on December 11, 1916—the centennial of Indiana statehood—as an Indiana Centenary marker. Its inscription identifies the Ten O'Clock line of 1809 and the Grouseland line of 1805 and records the distance from the monument to a buried stone marking the true corner; portions of the inscription are no longer legible.

The state historical marker (Indiana Historical Bureau marker 36.1966.1) was made available by the Indiana Sesquicentennial Commission, marking 150 years of statehood, and was erected along U.S. 50 in the fall of 1967. It was dedicated on April 27, 1968, in a ceremony attended by about twenty members of the Daughters of American Colonists, officers of the Daughters of the American Revolution, and officers of the Jackson County Historical Society, presided over by the local Daughters of American Colonists chapter's markers and memorials chairman. The speaker was Donald L. Heiwig of Seymour, a former mayor of the city (1948–1955) serving as county chairman of the Indiana Sesquicentennial Observance, who recounted the history of the treaties commemorated by the marker. The marker reads: "800 feet northwest is the point which marks the junction of the Grouseland Treaty line of 1805 with the Fort Wayne Treaty line of 1809. These and other treaties permitted early white settlement of Indiana."

== See also ==
- List of Indiana state historical markers in Jackson County
- Treaty of St. Mary's (1818), under which remaining tribal lands in the area were ceded
