= New Elizabethtown, Indiana =

- Unincorporated community
- Location within Indiana Location within the United States
- Coordinates: 38°55′02″N 85°59′13″W
- Country: United States
- State: Indiana
- County: Jackson
- Township: Brownstown
- Elevation: 584 ft (178 m)
- ZIP code: 47274
- FIPS code: 18-52848
- GNIS feature ID: 440042

New Elizabethtown is an unincorporated community in Brownstown Township, Jackson County, Indiana.

== History ==
New Elizabethtown was formerly called Elizabethtown. It was laid out in 1836.
