= Huff's Fort =

Coordinates: 38.871229045°N 86.081002838°W

Huff's fort was established around 1811 or 1812 northeast of Fort Vallonia in present-day Jackson County, Indiana, United States.

Huff's fort was established for the protection of early settlers land near the east fork of the White River. It was said not to have the fortifications of Vallonia but served as an important outpost as did Ketcham's fort a bit closer to Fort Vallonia.

John Sage and others built a fort at his place, but the princepal fort was at Vallonia, Huff's fort, higher up, and Ketcham's fort, still above and outside.

The Indians killed Buskirk and stole his two fine horses. The corpse was brought into Ketcham's fort the same evening, and on the next morning John Johnson, Robert Sturgeon and others came and hauled the corpse to Huff's fort for interment; after which Sturgeon started home and was killed at the half-mile branch, near Vallonia.
