= Ewing, Indiana =

Former town in Indiana, U.S.

Coordinates: 38°53′05″N 86°03′19″W

Ewing is a former town in Jackson County, Indiana, in the United States. Located just west of Brownstown, it was annexed to the latter in 1892.

== History ==
Ewing was laid out in 1857 by William H. Ewing when it was certain that the railroad would be extended to that point. A post office was established at Ewing in 1857, and remained in operation until it was discontinued in 1967.
