= Goodwin Memorial African Methodist Episcopal Zion Church =

Historic church in Amherst, Massachusetts, US

- U.S. National Register of Historic Places
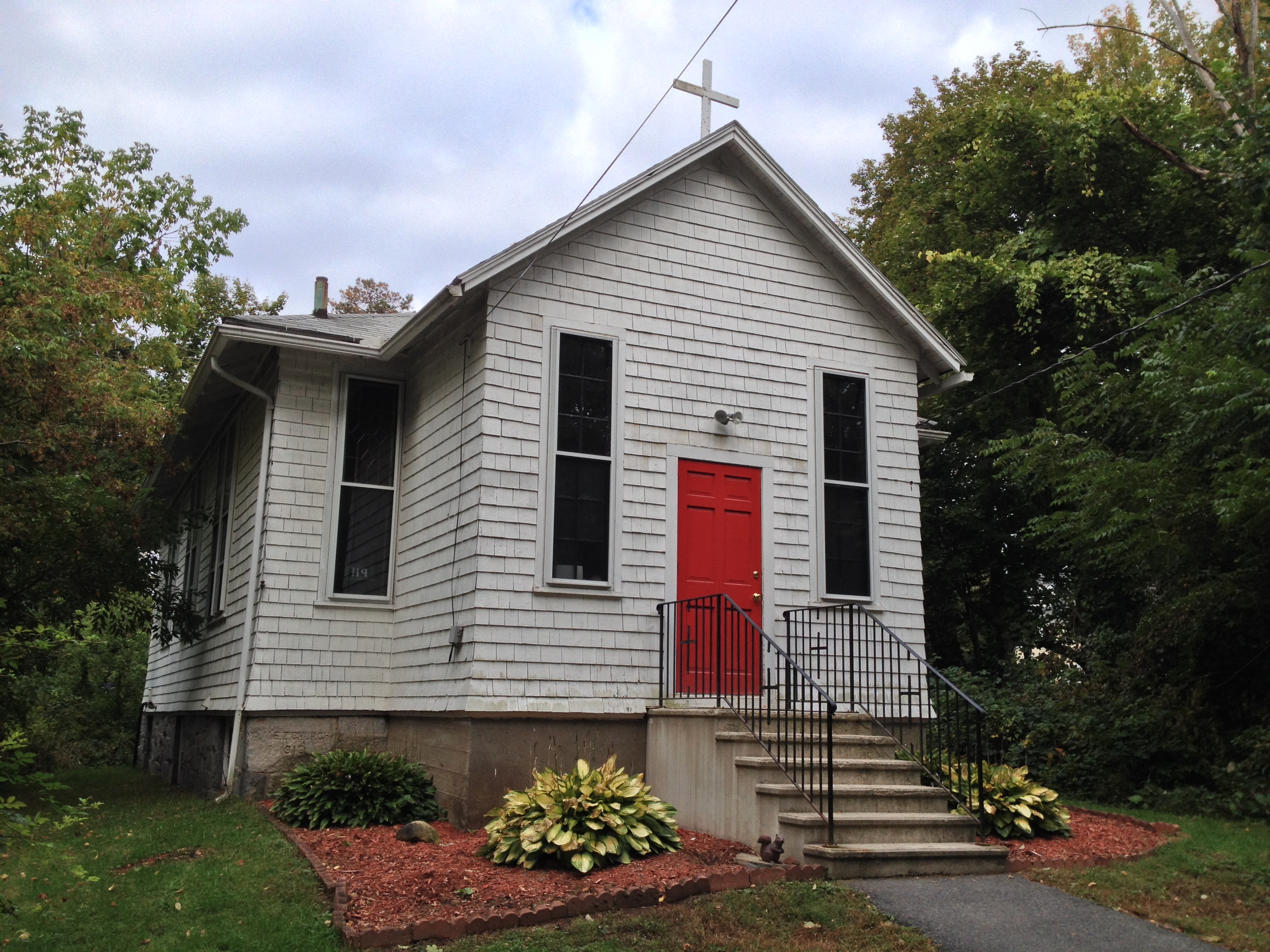

- Location within Massachusetts Location within the United States
- Location: Amherst, Massachusetts
- Coordinates: 42°22′15″N 72°31′23″W
- Built: 1910
- Architectural style: Bungalow/Craftsman
- NRHP reference No.: 00000416
- Added to NRHP: April 28, 2000

The Goodwin Memorial African Methodist Episcopal Zion Church is a historic church on Woodside Avenue in Amherst, Massachusetts. It is a member of the National African Methodist Episcopal (AME) Zion Church denomination, which is historically African American and began in the United States. The AME Zion denomination was created in conjunction with growing African American identities. Locally, the Goodwin Memorial AME Zion Church is one of the few physical structures that speaks to the rich African American history and heritage in the town of Amherst and surrounding areas.

== Early history ==
After the American Civil War, many African Americans migrated north to escape the discriminatory laws and violence of the South. Despite improved social conditions in northern states, African Americans largely remained second-class citizens. Houses of worship aided African American individuals struggling to build a sense of community, identity, and autonomy. This process occurred in Amherst with the creation of the Zion Chapel, built on Amherst College property in 1869. The African American congregation was primarily drawn from the area of Amherst now known as the Westside Historic District, encompassing sections of Baker and Snell streets, Northampton Road, and Hazel Avenue.

As the African American community expanded and the white congregation diminished, Zion members organized in the early 1900s to construct a new church with no affiliation to the college. The Zion members were initially denied independence by a regional conference of Congregational churches; however, members of Zion Chapel, including Moses and Anna Goodwin, refused to wait for approval. They formed a congregation of their own, calling themselves Union Church. They found a space to worship in the Amherst Town Hall. During their time in the town hall, community members solicited the support of local citizens and sympathetic members of the college community to secure funds for a building of their own. Booker T. Washington visited in 1904 to help raise additional funds.

Fundraising efforts produced a total of $611.10, which the Union Church used to buy a parcel of land in 1907. In the same year, the Union Church became officially affiliated with the national African Methodist Episcopal (AME) Zion Organization, whose theological beliefs challenged the notion that African Americans were second-class citizens. In 1909, the parcel transferred to Moses Goodwin who owned it during the time of construction of the church in 1910. Construction was completed in the summer of 1910 and the cornerstone was laid during a dedication ceremony on July 10, 1910, celebrating the African American community's successful efforts to gain independence.

== Goodwin family ==
Moses Goodwin (1854–1923) was a local African American community leader who owned a bicycle repair and locksmith shop in Amherst town center. He was born in South Carolina and moved to Amherst after the Civil War along with many other African Americans. In 1891, Moses married Anna Reed (1869–1943), affectionately known throughout town as “Ma” Goodwin. She ran the “Colonial Inn,” a boarding house for Amherst College students and gained local fame for her cooking, especially apple pie. Moses and Anna had three daughters: Olive, Amy, and Ruth.

In 1914, Moses Goodwin transferred ownership of the land and building to the trustees of the church. He remained extremely active in the church, serving as a trustee, treasurer, and benefactor of the AME Zion Church.

The Goodwin family were regular attendees and active members of the church community. Anna Goodwin was a core member of the church community, serving on the musical committee of Zion Chapel before joining the AME Zion Church. According to Moses’ daughter, Ruth, the church was a core element of African American community life in Amherst. Often Sundays at the church were filled with social and religious activities that lasted all day. Amy directed the choir of the AME Zion Church for a time, thus perpetuating the musical tradition in the family. Ruth regularly attended the church until her death in 1993.

In 1967, the church was renamed Moses Goodwin Memorial AME Zion Church in honor of Moses Goodwin and his family for their long-time service to the church and to the African American community of Amherst.

== Church today ==
Goodin Memorial Church continues to be a valuable religious and cultural institution in the Amherst community. In addition to regularly scheduled services and bible study sessions, the church hosts community events, such as baptisms, weddings, and funerals. As such, the church itself functions as a unifying force among the Goodwin congregation, creating a strong sense of community.

As Ruth Goodwin described in an interview on WGBY-TV in 1994, the church was a core element of African American community life in Amherst and was often a whole day affair on Sundays with both religious and social activities taking place. The church gained local fame for the fried chicken dinners prepared by members of the congregation in the church's basement kitchen. These meals were part of an annual fundraiser on the Town Common, and they would sell out every year.

Families - and specifically children - are an integral part of the church community and its history. Sunday school, vacation bible school, and children's services all foster a family-oriented ethic that continues to characterize Goodwin Memorial.

Music was, and continues to be, a central feature of these activities with the church choir as a vital aspect of the community. The church choir is a vital and dynamic part of the Goodwin community. Many in the present Goodwin congregation have fond memories related to the musical activities of the church which include a gospel and a bell choir.

The church was visited by an AME Zion Church Bishop for the first time in over one hundred years on Sunday, September 21, 2014. Bishop Mildred B. Hines is the first woman elected as bishop in the African Methodist Episcopal Zion Church. She spoke at the service to an enthusiastic and appreciative crowd of Goodwin members and guests. The event was covered by a local news station and, following the service, community members and Bishop Hines gathered together at a reception to commemorate the occasion.

== Historic building ==
The Goodwin Memorial chapel was listed on the National Register of Historic Places in 2000. The architecture reflects the informal Craftsman design principles popular at the time of its construction in 1910, namely the exposed rafter ends, ridge-hipped roof, and shingled walls and roof. The foundation is made of rubble stone, and contains a cornerstone engraved with “1910 AME Church.”

The interior of the church contains a stained glass window with a diamond pattern and the initials, “PH,” commemorating the life of Pearl Hawkins, a well-known parishioner who was very active in the church in the 1970s. The church exhibits religious vernacular architectural design and construction, as opposed to some of the more formal religious structures in the Amherst area. The structure has remained largely unchanged since its construction.

On November 1, 2014, Goodwin church became the first chapel to be included in the Amherst Historical Society's annual Tour of Historic Homes. During the event, visitors were greeted by Reverend Margaret Lawson and members of the congregation and treated to a selection of hymns performed by the church choir.

== See also ==
- Westside Historic District (Amherst, Massachusetts)
- National Register of Historic Places listings in Hampshire County, Massachusetts
