= Brownstown Township =

Brownstown Township may refer to:

- Brownstown Township, Jackson County, Indiana
- Brownstown Township, Michigan
