= Weddleville, Indiana =

- Unincorporated community
- Location within Indiana Location within the United States
- Coordinates: 38°50′19″N 86°13′13″W
- Country: United States
- State: Indiana
- County: Jackson
- Township: Carr
- Elevation: 824 ft (251 m)
- ZIP code: 47260
- FIPS code: 18-82170
- GNIS feature ID: 445630

Weddleville was an unincorporated town in Carr Township, Jackson County, Indiana.

Weddleville was laid out in 1855 by John A. Weddle and others, but had faded away by the 1880s. It is the site of the Carr High School, which remained in use until 1934, and which was listed on the National Register of Historic Places in 2011.
