= New Farmington, Indiana =

- Unincorporated community
- Location within Indiana Location within the United States
- Coordinates: 38°55′30″N 85°52′01″W
- Country: United States
- State: Indiana
- County: Jackson
- Township: Jackson
- Elevation: 617 ft (188 m)
- ZIP code: 47274
- FIPS code: 18-52902
- GNIS feature ID: 440046

New Farmington is an unincorporated community in Jackson Township, Jackson County, Indiana.

== History ==
New Farmington was laid out in 1852. A post office was established at New Farmington in 1852, and remained in operation until it was discontinued in 1868.

The town was incorporated in 1794. The country road was laid out on the east side of the river by Dr. Hubbard and others in 1793.
