= Kriete Corner, Indiana =

- Unincorporated community
- Location within Indiana Location within the United States
- Coordinates: 38°55′03″N 85°49′58″W
- Country: United States
- State: Indiana
- County: Jackson
- Township: Jackson
- Elevation: 561 ft (171 m)
- ZIP code: 47274
- FIPS code: 18-40572
- GNIS feature ID: 437459

Kriete Corner is an unincorporated community in Jackson Township, Jackson County, Indiana, United States.

The community was named for a family who kept a store.
