= Sparksville =

Sparksville may refer to:

- Sparksville, Indiana
- Sparksville, Kentucky

== Fictional Places ==
- An episode of Ben 10 takes place in Sparksville.
