= Tampico, Indiana =

- Unincorporated community
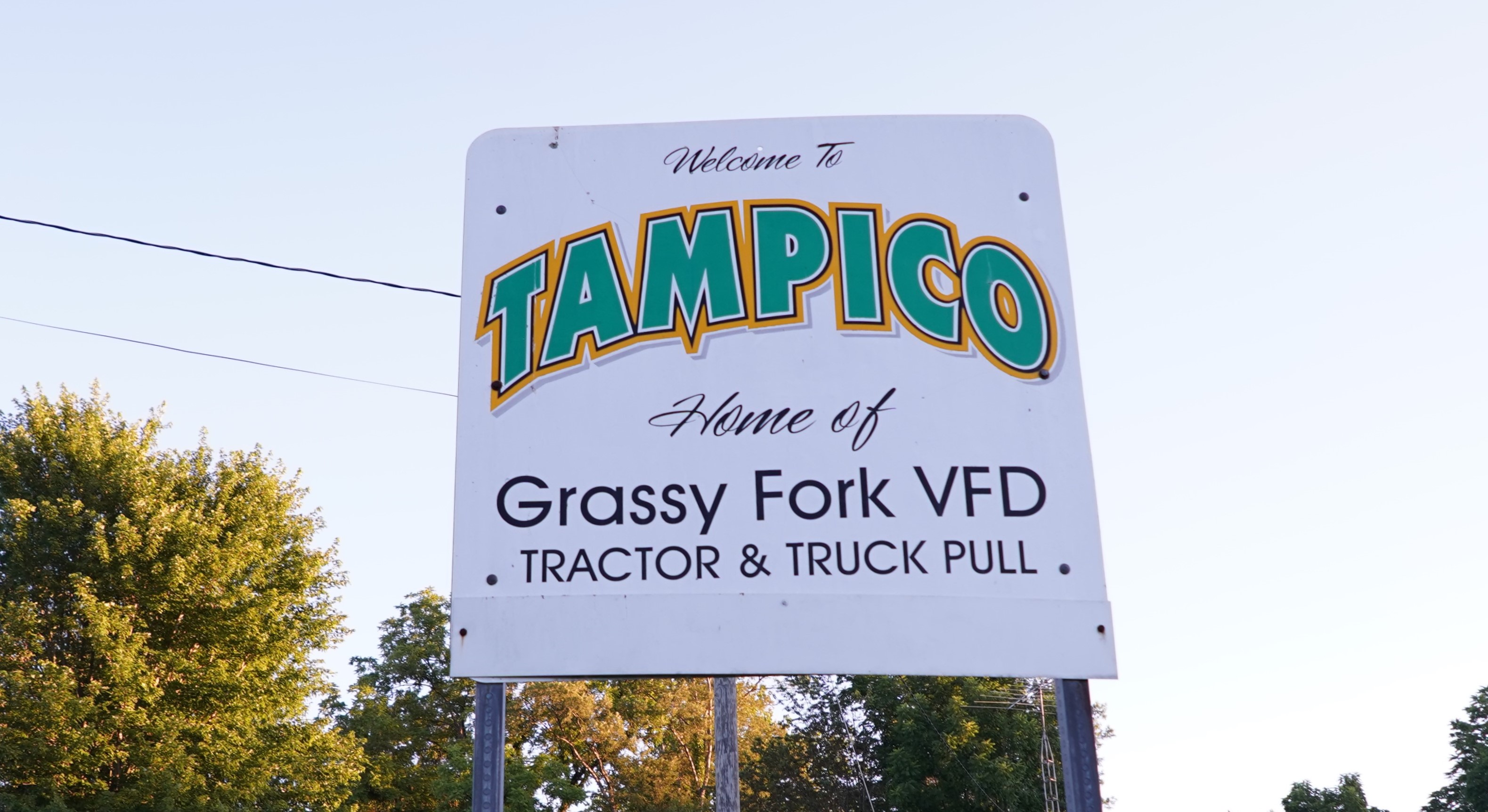
- Tampico, Indiana

- Location within Indiana Location within the United States
- Coordinates: 38°48′00″N 85°57′22″W
- Country: United States
- State: Indiana
- County: Jackson
- Township: Grassy Fork
- Elevation: 551 ft (168 m)
- ZIP code: 47220
- FIPS code: 18-74906
- GNIS feature ID: 447648

Tampico is an unincorporated community in Grassy Fork Township, Jackson County, Indiana.

== History ==
Tampico first grew around a blacksmith shop established in about 1840. The community was likely named after Tampico, in Mexico. A post office was established at Tampico in 1852, and remained in operation until it was discontinued in 1909.
