= Carr Township, Jackson County, Indiana =

Carr Township
- Township
- Location in Jackson County
- Coordinates: 38°48′45″N 86°12′54″W
- Country: United States
- State: Indiana
- County: Jackson

Government
  - Type: Indiana township

Area
  - Total: 41.95 sq mi (108.7 km^{2})
  - Land: 41.32 sq mi (107.0 km^{2})
  - Water: 0.63 sq mi (1.6 km^{2}) 1.50%
- Elevation: 761 ft (232 m)

Population (2020)
  - Total: 1,325
  - Density: 32.07/sq mi (12.38/km^{2})
- GNIS feature ID: 0453159

Carr Township is one of twelve townships in Jackson County, Indiana, United States. As of the 2010 census, its population was 1,325 and it contained 590 housing units.

Carr Township was named for Thomas Carr, an early county commissioner.

Historical population
Census	Pop.	Note	%±
1890	1,651		—
1900	1,706		3.3%
1910	1,659		−2.8%
1920	1,718		3.6%
1930	1,614		−6.1%
1940	1,785		10.6%
1950	1,561		−12.5%
1960	1,554		−0.4%
1970	1,457		−6.2%
1980	1,554		6.7%
1990	1,576		1.4%
2000	1,384		−12.2%
2010	1,510		9.1%
2020	1,325		−12.3%
Source: US Decennial Census

== History ==
Carr High School and Medora Covered Bridge are listed on the National Register of Historic Places.

== Geography ==
According to the 2010 census, the township has a total area of 41.95 square miles (108.7 km^{2}), of which 41.32 square miles (107.0 km^{2}) (or 98.50%) is land and 0.63 square miles (1.6 km^{2}) (or 1.50%) is water. The streams of Dry Creek and Greasy Creek run through this township.

=== Cities and towns ===
- Medora

=== Unincorporated towns ===
- Sparksville
- Weddleville

(This list is based on USGS data and may include former settlements.)

=== Adjacent townships ===
- Owen Township (north)
- Brownstown Township (northeast)
- Driftwood Township (east)
- Jefferson Township, Washington County (south)
- Brown Township, Washington County (southwest)
- Guthrie Township, Lawrence County (west)

=== Cemeteries ===
The township contains ten cemeteries: Beem, Brown, Goss, Heighton Hill, Hinderlider, Holmes, Lanning Spur, Shoemaker, Stewart and Zollman.

=== Major highways ===
- Indiana State Road 235
