= Carr High School =

- U.S. National Register of Historic Places
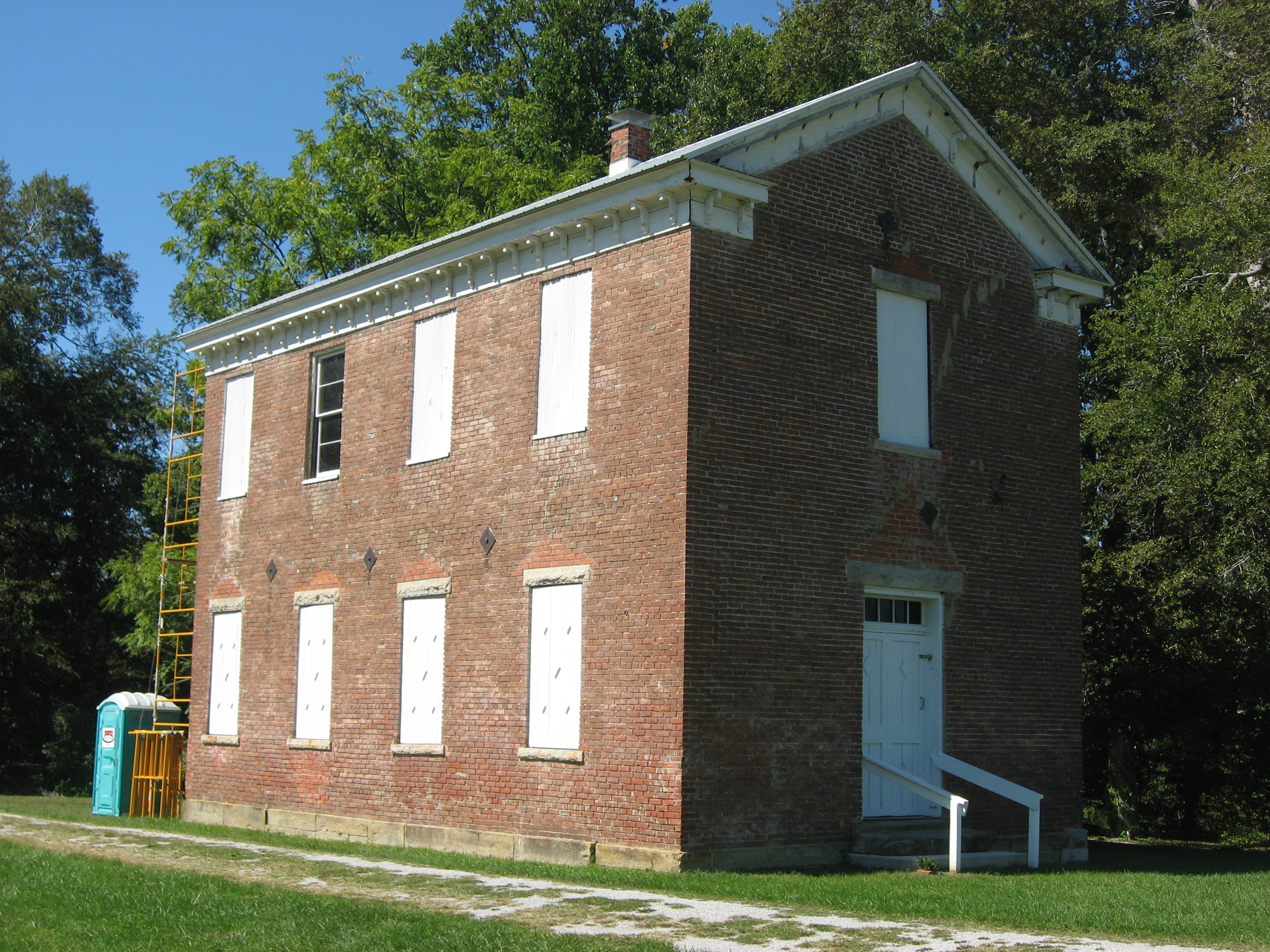
- Carr High School, September 2011

- Location within Indiana Location within the United States
- Location: 10059 W. County Road 250 S., west of Medora in Carr Township, Jackson County, Indiana
- Coordinates: 38°50′18″N 86°13′25″W
- Area: 1.32 acres (0.53 ha)
- Built: 1857
- Architectural style: Federal, Greek Revival, Italianate
- MPS: Indiana's Public Common and High Schools MPS
- NRHP reference No.: 11000911
- Added to NRHP: December 15, 2011

Carr High School, also known as Weddleville High School, is a historic high school building located at Weddleville in Carr Township, Jackson County, Indiana. It was built in 1857, and is a simple two-story, brick, gable front building. The building exhibits vernacular Federal / Greek Revival and Italianate style design elements. It sits on a limestone foundation and measures 24 by 40 feet (7.3 by 12.2 m). The building remained in use as a school until 1934.

It was listed on the National Register of Historic Places in 2011.
