= Jackson–Washington State Forest =

State forest and historic place in Indiana, U.S.

Jackson-Washington State Forest
- IUCN category VI (protected area with sustainable use of natural resources)
- Location within Indiana
- Location: Jackson and Washington counties, Indiana, USA
- Nearest city: Brownstown, Indiana
- Coordinates: 38°50′42″N 86°03′07″W
- Governing body: Indiana Department of Natural Resources

Jackson–Washington State Forest is a state forest in Jackson and Washington counties in Indiana, USA, near the town of Brownstown. The forest includes over 18,000 acres (7,300 ha), most of which was bought by the state in the 1930s and 1950s. Jackson–Washington State Forest offers camping, fishing, hunting, archery and trails for hiking, horseback riding and cycling.

== Picnic Area, Jackson State Forest ==
- Picnic Area, Jackson State Forest
- U.S. National Register of Historic Places
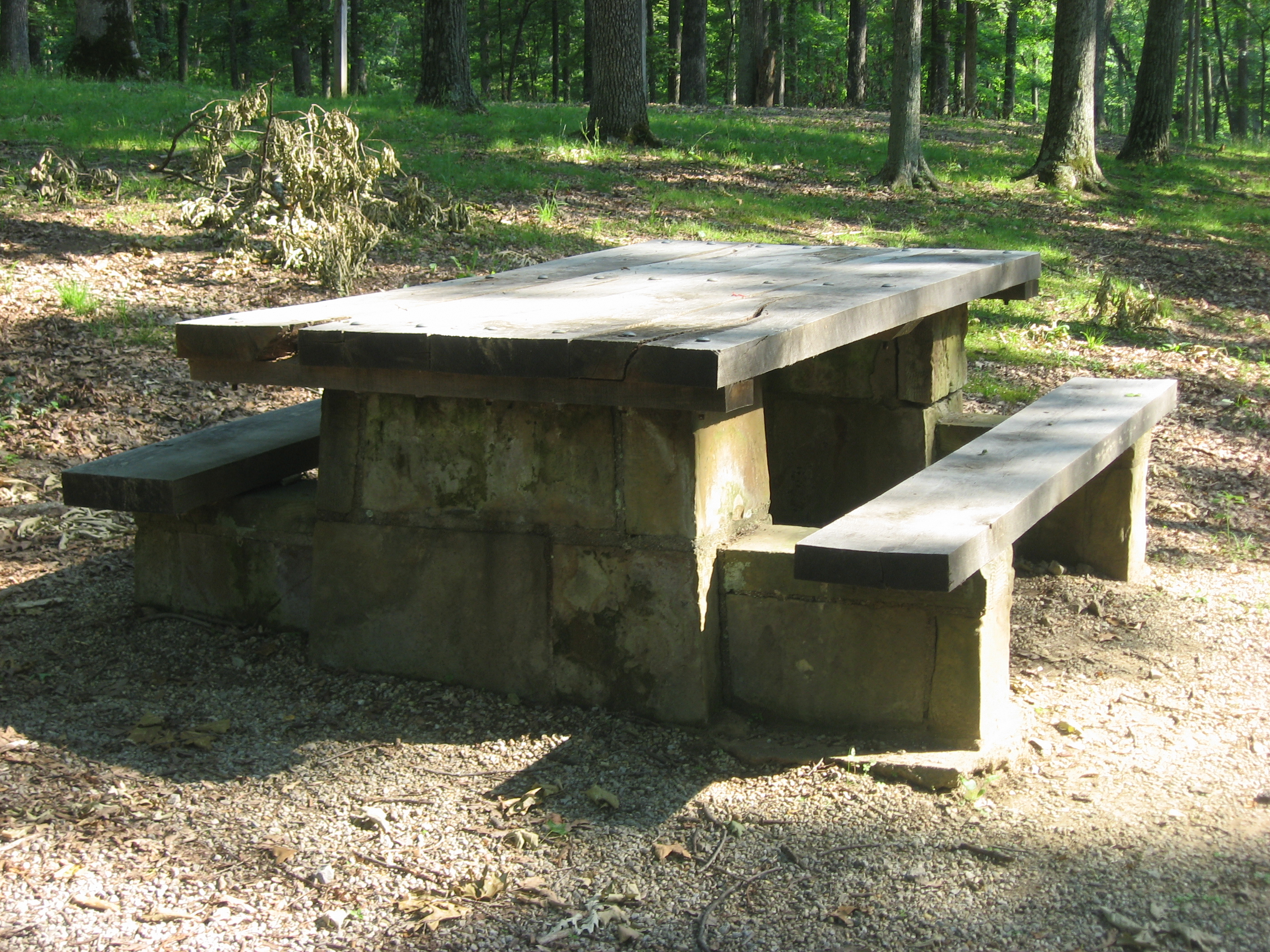
- Stone picnic table in the CCC picnic grounds at Jackson-Washington State Forest, June 2011

- Location within Indiana Location within the United States
- Location: Approximately 1 mile north of State Road 250 in the Jackson-Washington State Forest, southeast of Brownstown, Driftwood Township, Jackson County, Indiana
- Area: 2.8 acres (1.1 ha)
- Built: 1934
- Architect: Civilian Conservation Corps
- Architectural style: park rustic
- MPS: New Deal Resources on Indiana State Lands MPS
- NRHP reference No.: 96001554
- Added to NRHP: January 2, 1997

The Picnic Area, Jackson State Forest, also known as the Knob Creek Upper Picnic Area, is a historic picnic area located in Jackson–Washington State Forest, Driftwood Township. It is nestled in an oak grove on a hillside to the northwest above the former Sawmill Lake. Built in 1934 by the Civilian Conservation Corps, the area includes six contributing resources: the oven shelter, stone platform with table, drinking fountain shelter, two sets of stone steps and the site, which includes 18 stone and timber picnic tables and five stone fireplace ovens.

It was listed on the National Register of Historic Places in 1997.
