= Indiana State Road 235 =

State highway in Indiana, United States

State Road 235
- SR 235 highlighted in red

Route information
- Maintained by INDOT
- Length: 7.518 mi (12.099 km)

Major junctions
- South end: SR 135 near Medora
- North end: US 50 near Medora

Location
- Country: United States
- State: Indiana

Highway system
- Indiana State Highway System; Interstate; US; State; Scenic
← SR 234	→ SR 236

State Road 235 in the U.S. state of Indiana is a short route in southwest Jackson County.

== Route description ==
State Road 235 begins at State Road 135 east of Medora and southwest of Brownstown. The road travels west to Medora, which it reaches after about 3.5 miles (5.6 km). The Medora Covered Bridge parallels the road as it crosses the East Fork of the White River. Leaving Medora, the road travels north to U.S. Route 50.

== History ==
SR 235 in the 1930s was originally part of US 50.

== Major intersections ==
The entire route is in Jackson County.

Location	mi	km	Destinations	Notes
Driftwood Township	0.000	0.000	SR 135 – Salem, Brownstown	Southern terminus of SR 235
Owen Township	7.518	12.099	US 50 – Bedford, Brownstown	Northern terminus of SR 235
1.000 mi = 1.609 km; 1.000 km = 0.621 mi
