= Driftwood Township, Jackson County, Indiana =

Driftwood Township
- Township
- Location in Jackson County
- Coordinates: 38°48′43″N 86°06′54″W
- Country: United States
- State: Indiana
- County: Jackson

Government
  - Type: Indiana township

Area
  - Total: 28.3 sq mi (73 km^{2})
  - Land: 27.66 sq mi (71.6 km^{2})
  - Water: 0.64 sq mi (1.7 km^{2}) 2.26%
- Elevation: 571 ft (174 m)

Population (2020)
  - Total: 964
  - Density: 34.9/sq mi (13.5/km^{2})
- GNIS feature ID: 0453266

Driftwood Township is one of twelve townships in Jackson County, Indiana, United States. As of the 2020 census, its population was 964 and it contained 390 housing units.

Historical population
Census	Pop.	Note	%±
1890	1,066		—
1900	1,157		8.5%
1910	1,111		−4.0%
1920	1,007		−9.4%
1930	993		−1.4%
1940	1,015		2.2%
1950	956		−5.8%
1960	937		−2.0%
1970	980		4.6%
1980	937		−4.4%
1990	959		2.3%
2000	836		−12.8%
2010	860		2.9%
2020	964		12.1%
Source: US Decennial Census

== History ==
Cavanaugh Bridge, Joseph Jackson Hotel, Medora Covered Bridge, and Picnic Area-Jackson State Forest are listed on the National Register of Historic Places.

== Geography ==
According to the 2010 census, the township has a total area of 28.3 square miles (73 km^{2}), of which 27.66 square miles (71.6 km^{2}) (or 97.74%) is land and 0.64 square miles (1.7 km^{2}) (or 2.26%) is water. The stream of Mill Creek runs through this township.

=== Unincorporated towns ===
- Vallonia

=== Extinct towns ===
- Petersburg

=== Adjacent townships ===
- Brownstown Township (northeast)
- Grassy Fork Township (east)
- Monroe Township, Washington County (south)
- Jefferson Township, Washington County (southwest)
- Carr Township (west)

=== Cemeteries ===
The township contains four cemeteries: Empson, Harrell, Peters, and Smith.

=== Major highways ===
- Indiana State Road 135
- Indiana State Road 235

== Education ==
Driftwood Township residents may obtain a free library card from the Brownstown Public Library in Brownstown.
