= Sparksville, Indiana =

- Unincorporated community
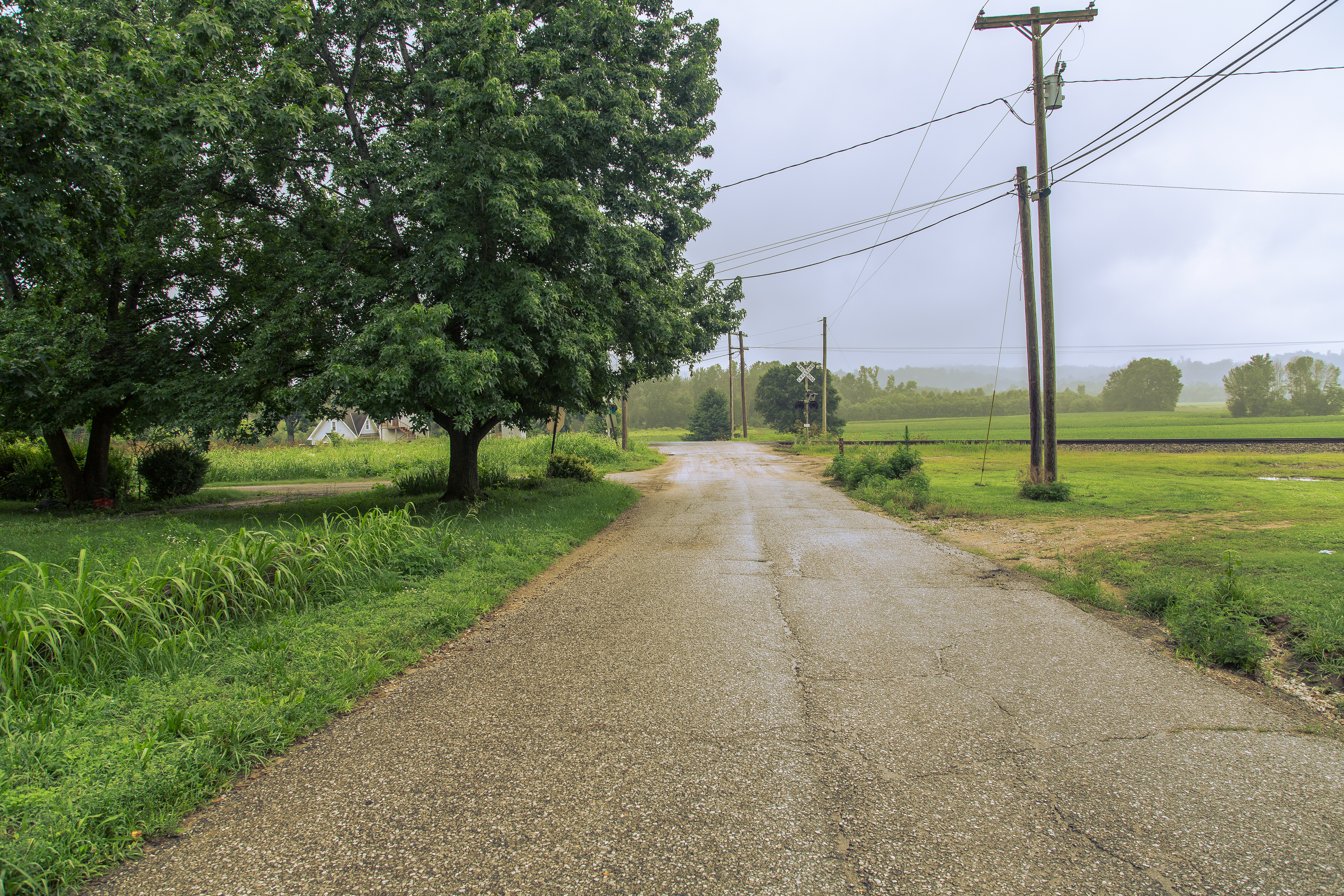
- A country road in Sparksville, as seen in 2016

- Location within Indiana Location within the United States
- Coordinates: 38°46′40″N 86°14′14″W
- Country: United States
- State: Indiana
- County: Jackson
- Township: Carr
- Elevation: 564 ft (172 m)
- ZIP code: 47260
- FIPS code: 18-71702
- GNIS feature ID: 443912

Sparksville is an unincorporated community in Carr Township, Jackson County, Indiana.

== History ==
Sparksville was platted in 1857. The community was named in honor of Stephen Sparks, who had operated a ferry near the town site. A post office was established at Sparksville in 1856, and remained in operation until it was discontinued in 1956. A ferry bridge was built east of Sparksville in 1890.

== Geography ==
=== Climate ===
The climate in this area is characterized by hot, humid summers and generally mild to cool winters. According to the Köppen Climate Classification system, Sparksville has a humid subtropical climate, abbreviated "Cfa" on climate maps.
