= Grassy Fork Township, Jackson County, Indiana =

Grassy Fork Township
- Township
- Location in Jackson County
- Coordinates: 38°47′22″N 85°57′55″W
- Country: United States
- State: Indiana
- County: Jackson

Government
  - Type: Indiana township

Area
  - Total: 39.75 sq mi (103.0 km^{2})
  - Land: 39.67 sq mi (102.7 km^{2})
  - Water: 0.08 sq mi (0.21 km^{2}) 0.20%
- Elevation: 522 ft (159 m)

Population (2020)
  - Total: 697
  - Density: 17.6/sq mi (6.78/km^{2})
- GNIS feature ID: 0453339

Grassy Fork Township is one of twelve townships in Jackson County, Indiana, United States. As of the 2020 census, its population was 697 and it contained 293 housing units. It was named from the Grassy Fork Creek.

Historical population
Census	Pop.	Note	%±
1890	1,147		—
1900	1,197		4.4%
1910	1,021		−14.7%
1920	886		−13.2%
1930	778		−12.2%
1940	927		19.2%
1950	902		−2.7%
1960	877		−2.8%
1970	807		−8.0%
1980	792		−1.9%
1990	732		−7.6%
2000	775		5.9%
2010	668		−13.8%
2020	697		4.3%
Source: US Decennial Census

== Geography ==
According to the 2010 census, the township has a total area of 39.75 square miles (103.0 km^{2}), of which 39.67 square miles (102.7 km^{2}) (or 99.80%) is land and 0.08 square miles (0.21 km^{2}) (or 0.20%) is water. The streams of Grassy Fork, Knob Creek and Pond Creek run through this township.

=== Unincorporated towns ===
- Tampico

=== Adjacent townships ===
- Washington Township (northeast)
- Vernon Township (east)
- Gibson Township, Washington County (south)
- Monroe Township, Washington County (southwest)
- Driftwood Township (west)
- Brownstown Township (northwest)

=== Cemeteries ===
The township contains eleven cemeteries: Blair, Lubker, Mount Pleasant, Pioneer, Riechers/Niermans, Rucker, Russell Chapel, Stunkel, Sturgeon, Tuell, and Waskom.

=== Major highways ===
- Indiana State Road 39

== Education ==
Grassy Fork Township residents may obtain a free library card from the Brownstown Public Library in Brownstown.
