= Cavanaugh Bridge =

- U.S. National Register of Historic Places
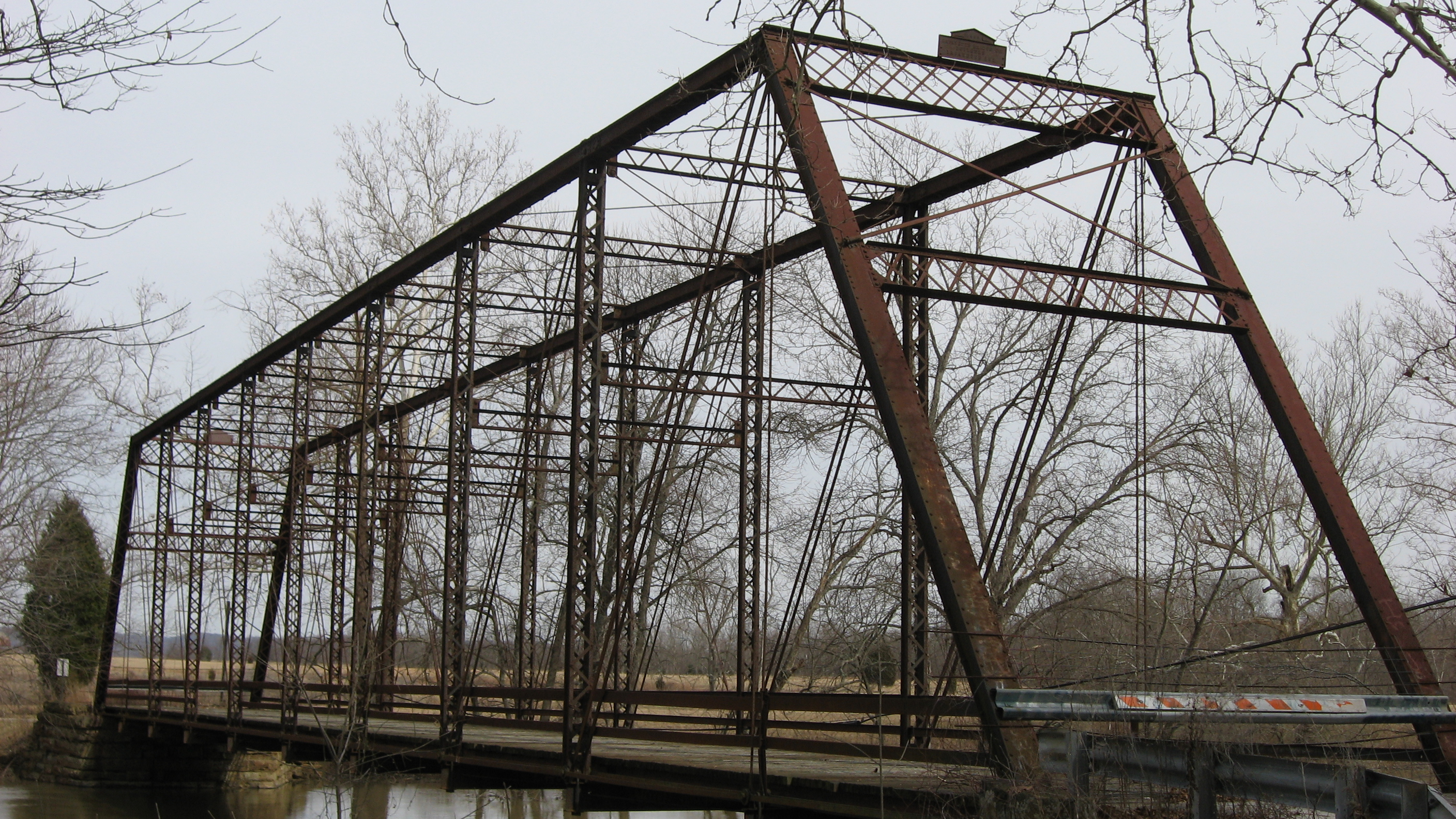
- Cavanaugh Bridge, March 2011

- Location within Washington County, Indiana Location within Indiana Location within the United States
- Location: 0.6 miles south of County Road 700S on County Road 550W over the Muscatatuck River, southwest of Brownstown in Driftwood Township, Jackson County, Indiana
- Coordinates: 38°45′48″N 86°8′12″W
- Area: less than one acre
- Built: c. 1899
- Built by: Lafayette Bridge Co.; et.al.
- Architectural style: Pratt through truss
- NRHP reference No.: 07001280
- Added to NRHP: December 19, 2007

Cavanaugh Bridge, also known as Jackson County Bridge #195, is a historic Pratt through truss bridge located in Driftwood Township, Jackson County, Indiana.

== Background ==
The structure was built in 1899 by the Lafayette Bridge Co. and spans the Muscatatuck River. The 174 foot long steel bridge rests on native brown sandstone abutments.

It was listed on the National Register of Historic Places in 2007.

The bridge was demolished in March 2015 and replaced with a new bridge 200 yards upstream.
