= Medora Covered Bridge =

- U.S. National Register of Historic Places
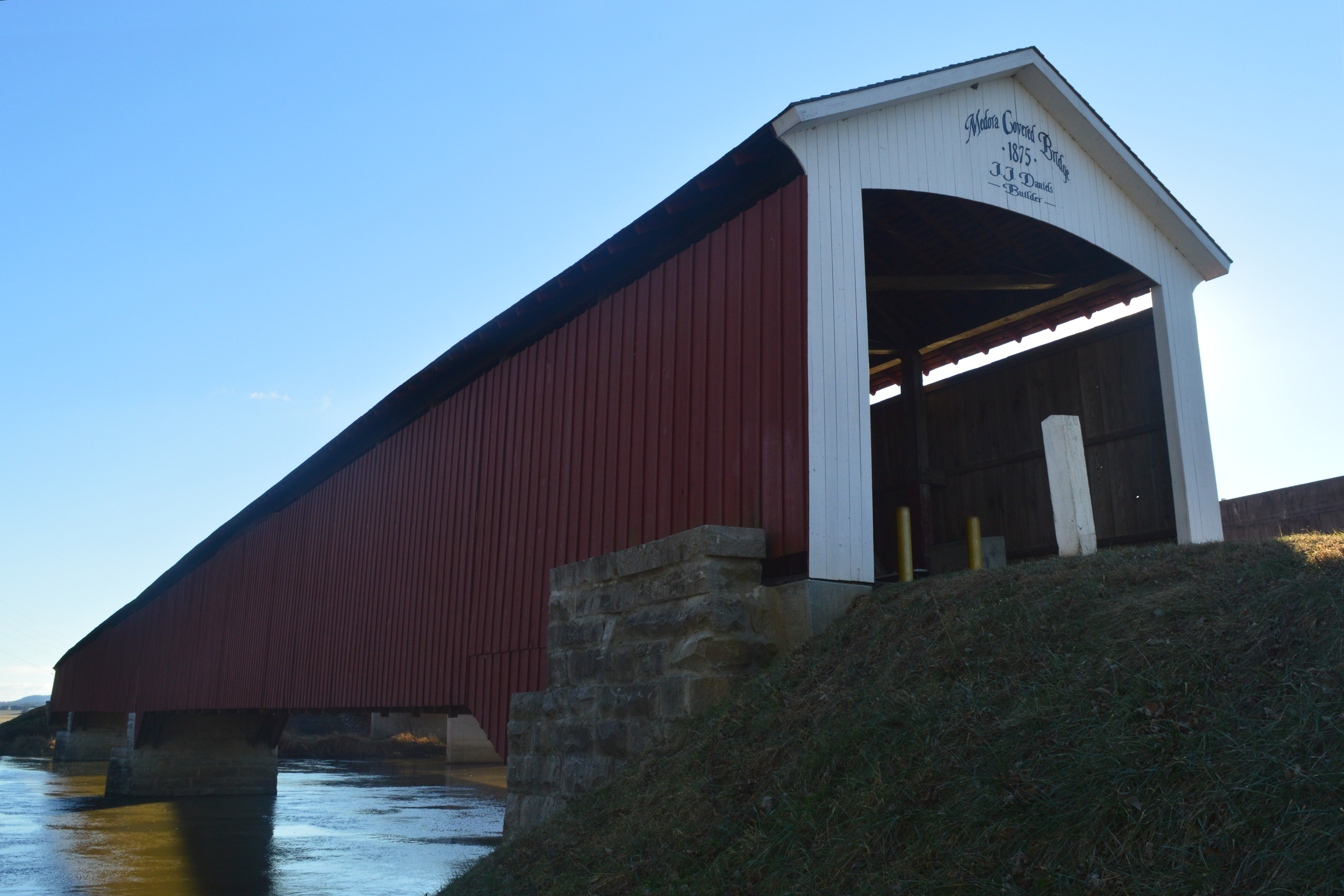

- Location within Indiana Location within the United States
- Location: Medora, Indiana
- Coordinates: 38°49′07″N 86°08′50″W
- Architect: Joseph J. Daniels
- Architectural style: Burr Arch Truss
- NRHP reference No.: 07000977
- Added to NRHP: September 19, 2007

The Medora Covered Bridge was the longest covered bridge in the United States with the entire original historic truss still in place with some repairs but no structural changes. Measuring the clear span (abutment face to abutment face) of 431 feet 10 inches (131.62 m), the Medora Covered Bridge is the longest historic covered bridge in the United States. The roof length of 461 feet (141 m) and the siding at the floor length of 459 feet (140 m) are also the longest historic covered bridge measurements in the U.S.

== Location ==
The Medora Covered Bridge is located in Carr Township, Jackson County, Indiana, and crosses the East Fork of the White River running parallel to State Road 235. It is approximately 1 mile (1.6 km) east of Medora and 9 miles (14 km) southwest of Brownstown.

== History ==
The Medora Covered Bridge was built in 1875 by J. J. Daniels at a cost of $18,142.00 and took nine months to build. The bridge was covered to protect the truss from the elements. Before the bridge was built people crossed the river by ferry.

It has been reported but not verified that at one time there was wooden railing down the middle of the bridge separating the two-way traffic. As the vehicles became wider, the railing was removed and it was then one-way.

Until 1935 the bridge carried U.S. Route 50 when it (US 50) was moved four miles to the north.

In 1968 the bridge was scheduled for demolition when the new modern parallel bridge was to be opened, but was saved by an order from then Governor Whitcomb in 1971.

A modern parallel bridge was opened in 1973. The covered bridge was closed to vehicular traffic at that time.

In 2007, the bridge was added to the National Register of Historic Places.

In June 2011 a rehabilitation of the bridge was completed. The original truss remained in place with a few repairs. The cedar shake shingles, siding (seven of the original boards, identified by square nail holes, were placed on the north side of the far west end), pylons, and some of the rafters were replaced. Except for the shingles, most of these items were original but badly deteriorated. Much of the flooring was replaced but was not original.

== See also ==
- List of bridges documented by the Historic American Engineering Record in Indiana
- List of covered bridges in Indiana
