= Vallonia, Indiana =

- Census-designated place
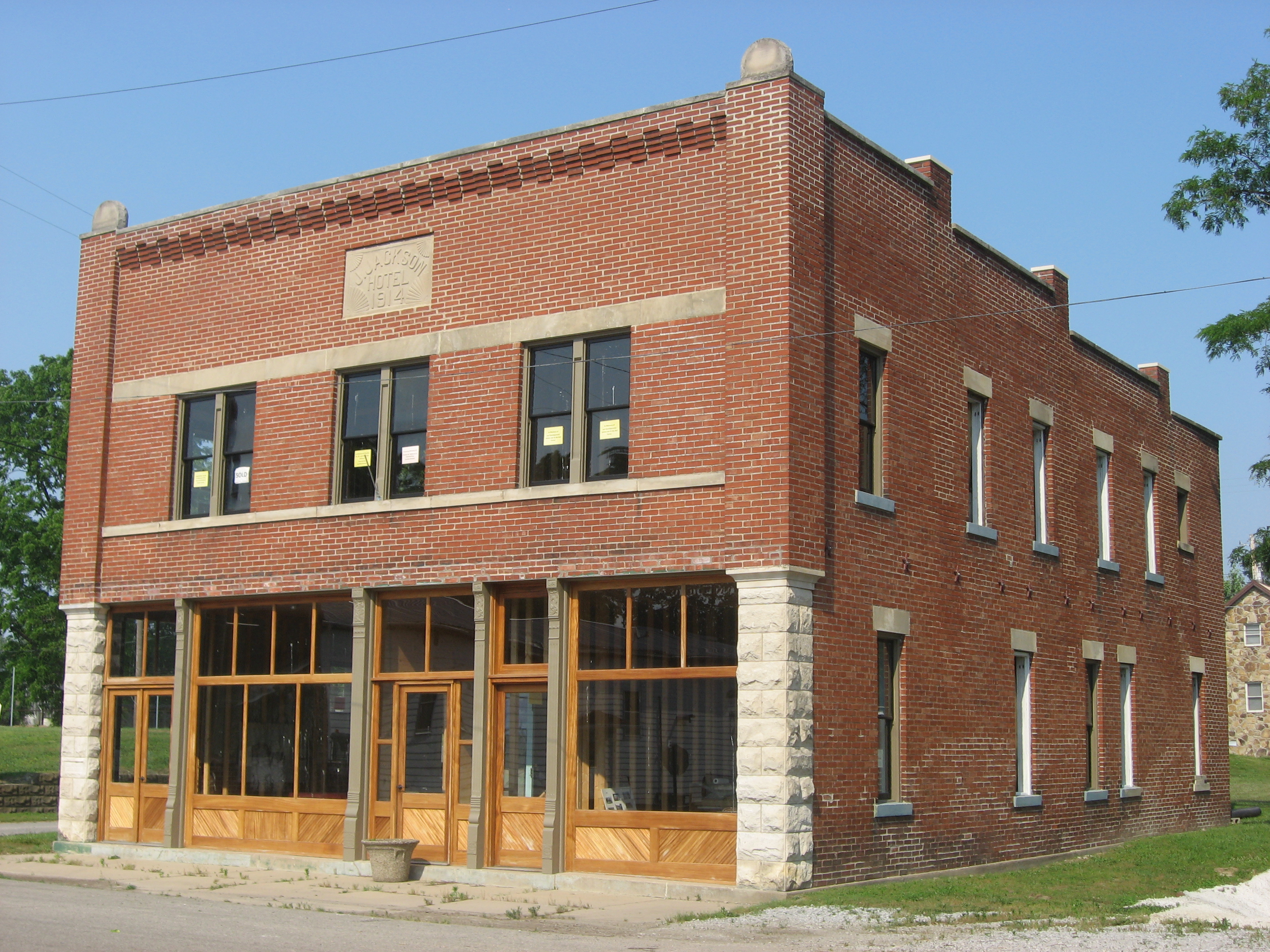
- The Joseph Jackson Hotel, a historic site in the community

- Location of Vallonia in Jackson County, Indiana

- Location within Indiana Location within the United States
- Coordinates: 38°50′46″N 86°05′57″W
- Country: United States
- State: Indiana
- County: Jackson
- Townships: Driftwood, Brownstown

Area
  - Total: 0.76 sq mi (1.96 km^{2})
  - Land: 0.76 sq mi (1.96 km^{2})
  - Water: 0 sq mi (0.00 km^{2})
- Elevation: 535 ft (163 m)

Population (2020)
  - Total: 379
  - Density: 501.4/sq mi (193.61/km^{2})
- Time zone: UTC-4:00 (EDT)
  - Summer (DST): UTC-5:00
- ZIP code: 47281
- FIPS code: 18-78290
- GNIS feature ID: 2629880

Vallonia is an unincorporated community and census-designated place (CDP) in Driftwood and Brownstown townships, Jackson County, Indiana, United States. It was an 18th-century French settlement and 19th-century American frontier fortification known as Fort Vallonia. As of the 2020 census, Vallonia had a population of 379.

== History ==
=== Fort Vallonia ===
Vallonia was a French settlement of the late 18th century and lay between the Muscatatuck River and the White River's east fork (aka Driftwood). Circa 1810, hostilities began between the settlers and Native Americans. Governor General William Henry Harrison ordered a fort built as well as a number of other defensive structures including a large stockade, garrison, blockhouses, and a spring. to be built to protect the some 90 families in the area. Two companies of Indiana Rangers were stationed here during the War of 1812.

Huff's Fort and Ketcham's Fort were two other fortifications, though not as large. Huff's fort was said to be "higher up" than Vallonia and Ketcham's "still above".

One of the companies of Indiana Rangers was newly organized, and set out to investigate claims of a Native American war party near Brownstown. Finding no war party, the company returned to Fort Vallonia, but one ranger, Robert Sturgeon, rode ahead. He was ambushed by Native Americans and killed. The Rangers, in a panic, rode hard back to Fort Vallonia, never stopping to help Sturgeon. Five civilians finally left the fort to recover Sturgeon's body, and buried it near the fort. When Major John Tipton arrived and learned of the Rangers' conduct, he assumed command of the fort and began routine drills of the two companies stationed at the fort. A later skirmish, known as the Battle of Tipton's Island, allowed the Rangers to prove their ability to engage Native Americans.

Numerous attacks and skirmishes occurred between the Rangers of Fort Vallonia and American Indians during the War of 1812. Attacks in this area of the Indiana Territory diminished after an expedition to destroy the Miami village at the confluence of the Wabash River and Mississinewa River. That expedition left Fort Vallonia on July 1, 1813, led by Colonel William Russell in command of the Indiana Rangers and Major Zachary Taylor (future President of the United States) in command of the 7th Infantry Regiment, as well as a company of Kentucky volunteers. The force destroyed the deserted village, which had been heavily fortified by Tecumseh, but covered 500 miles (800 km) without encountering a single Native American.

=== Later developments ===
Vallonia was legally platted in 1853.

== Geography ==
Vallonia is located in southwestern Jackson County on the southeast side of the valley of the East Fork of the White River. Indiana State Road 135 passes through the community, leading northeast 4 miles (6 km) to Brownstown, the county seat, and south 18 miles (29 km) to Salem.

According to the U.S. Census Bureau, the Vallonia CDP has a total area of 0.76 square miles (1.97 km^{2}), of which 0.2 acres (763 m^{2}), or 0.04%, are water.

== Demographics ==
Historical population
Census	Pop.	Note	%±
2020	379		—
U.S. Decennial Census

== Today ==
Vallonia is a small unincorporated community located on S. State Road 135. In 1972, Fort Vallonia was rebuilt and is the centerpiece for the annual Fort Vallonia Days festival. The three-day event is held on the third weekend of October and draws crowds of up to 30,000 people.

== Notable people ==
- William Graham (1782–1858), U.S. representative from Indiana
