= T. Harlan and Helen Montgomery House =

Historic house in Indiana, United States

- U.S. National Register of Historic Places
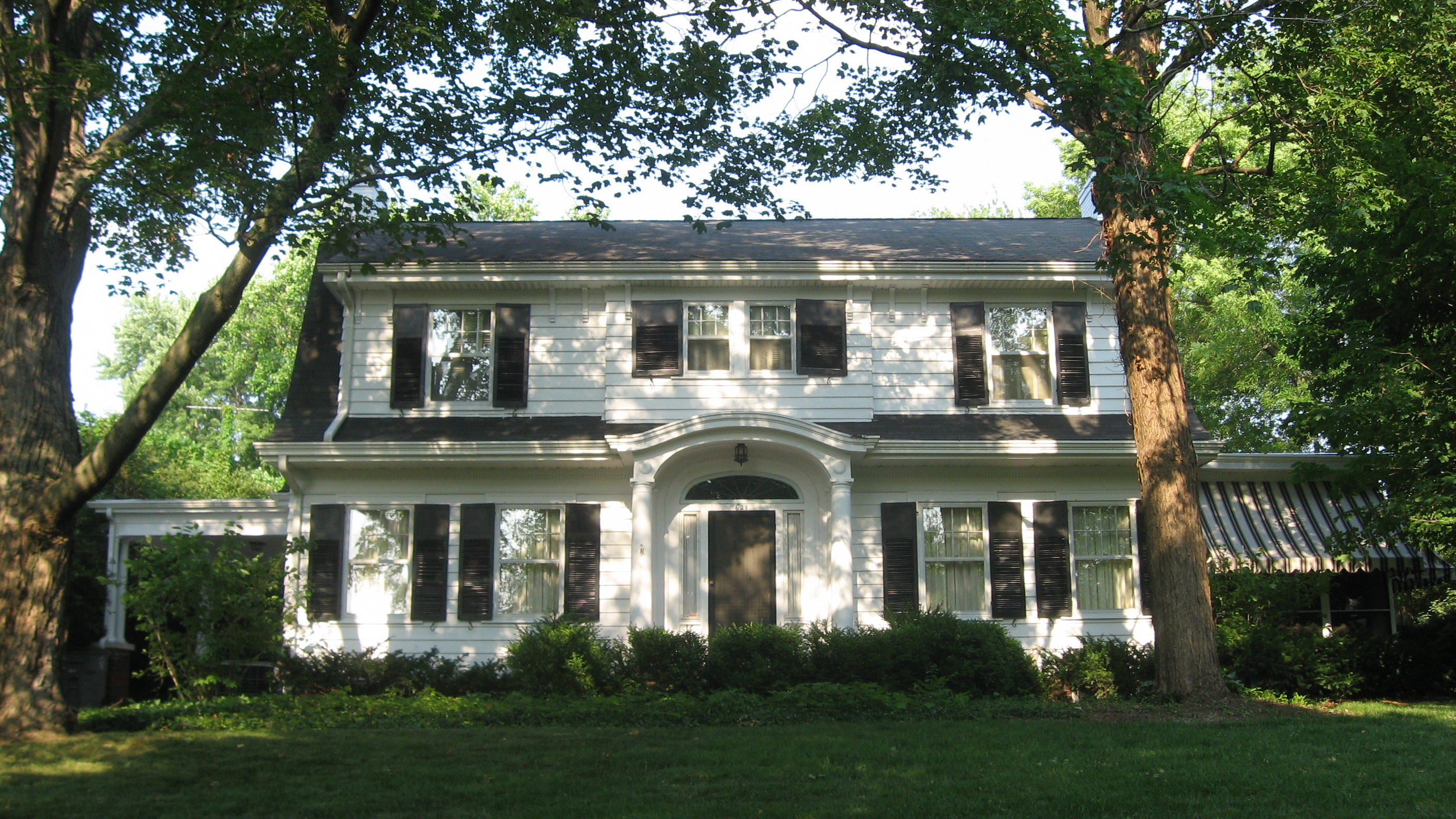
- T. Harlan and Helen Montgomery House, June 2011

- Location within Indiana Location within the United States
- Location: 628 N. Poplar St., Seymour, Indiana
- Coordinates: 38°57′49″N 85°53′39″W
- Area: 0.33 acres (0.13 ha)
- Built: 1922-1929
- Architectural style: Colonial Revival
- NRHP reference No.: 10001080
- Added to NRHP: December 27, 2010

T. Harlan and Helen Montgomery House is a historic home located at Seymour, Indiana. It was built between 1922 and 1929, and is a two-story, Dutch Colonial Revival style frame dwelling with a gambrel roof. It consists of a main rectangular block with a small portico, side porch, rear ell, and porte cochere. Also on the property is a contributing garage constructed in 1926.

It was listed on the National Register of Historic Places in 2010.
