= First Presbyterian Church (Seymour, Indiana) =

Historic church in Indiana, United States

- U.S. National Register of Historic Places
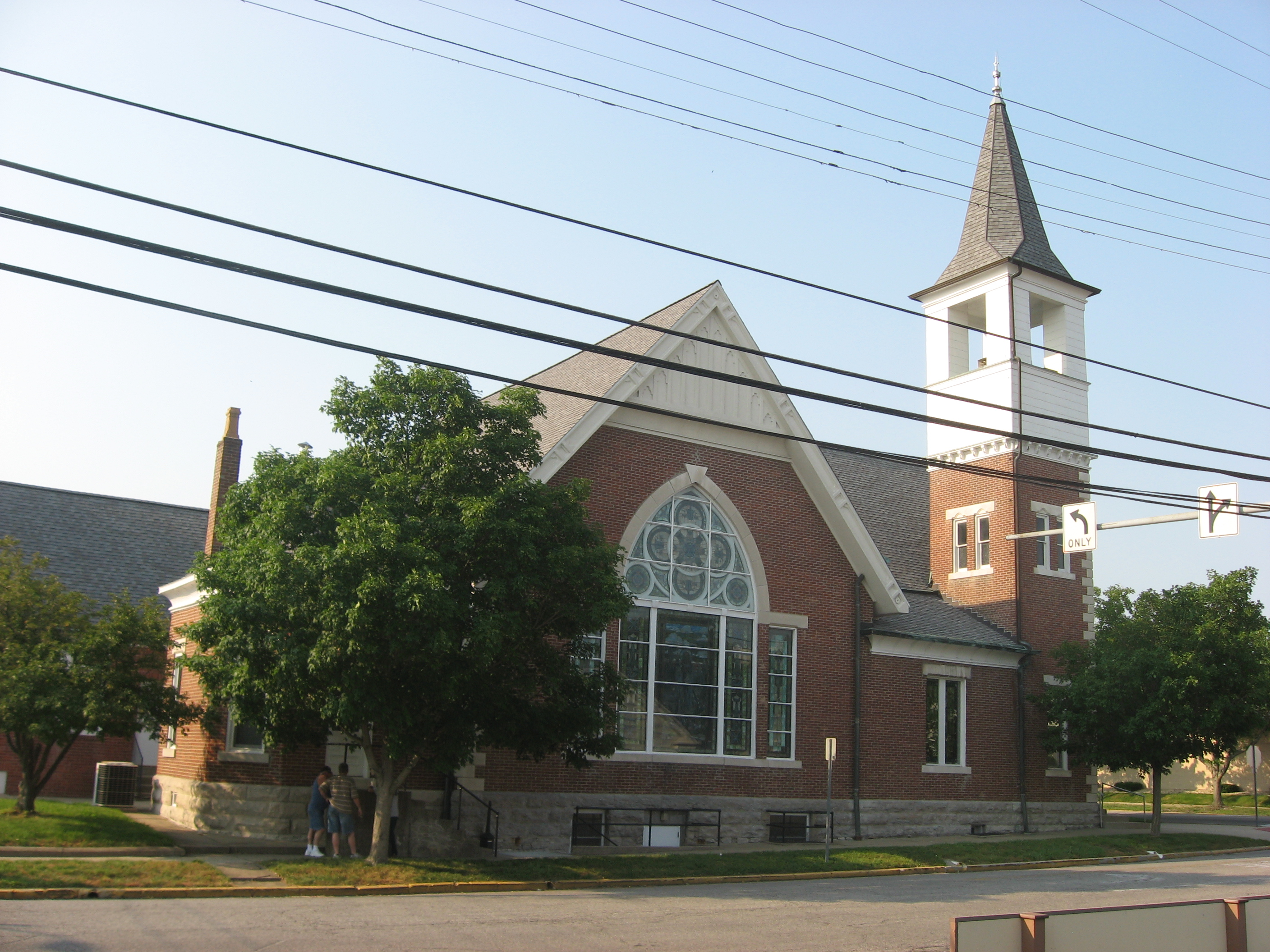

- Location within Indiana Location within the United States
- Location: 301 N. Walnut St., Seymour, Indiana
- Coordinates: 38°57′35″N 85°53′32″W
- Area: less than one acre
- Built: 1884
- Architect: Jacoby Art Glass Co.; Cook, Lee
- Architectural style: Late Gothic Revival
- NRHP reference No.: 91001867
- Added to NRHP: December 19, 1991

First Presbyterian Church is a historic Presbyterian church located at 301 N. Walnut Street in Seymour, Indiana. Completed in 1884, it is a one-story, Late Gothic Revival style brick building with a cross-axial plan. It features a prominent corner bell tower and large art glass windows measuring 18 feet wide by 22 feet high.

It was listed on the National Register of Historic Places in 1991.
