= Jackson Township, Jackson County, Indiana =

Jackson Township
- Township
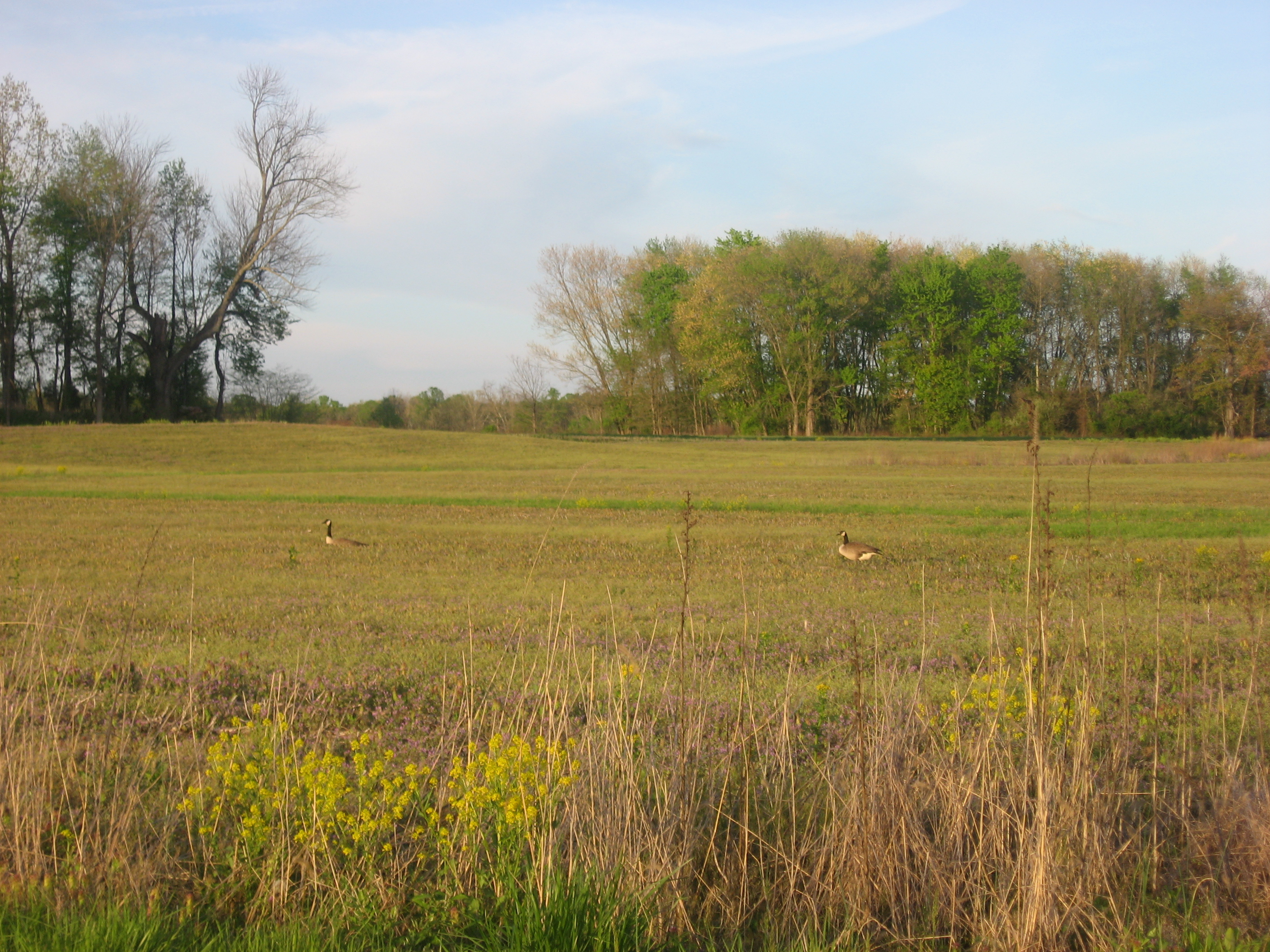
- A field on the Muscatatuck National Wildlife Refuge

- Location in Jackson County
- Coordinates: 38°56′27″N 85°52′46″W
- Country: United States
- State: Indiana
- County: Jackson

Government
  - Type: Indiana township

Area
  - Total: 34.78 sq mi (90.1 km^{2})
  - Land: 34.44 sq mi (89.2 km^{2})
  - Water: 0.34 sq mi (0.88 km^{2}) 0.98%
- Elevation: 600 ft (183 m)

Population (2020)
  - Total: 23,135
  - Density: 671.7/sq mi (259.4/km^{2})
- GNIS feature ID: 0453451

Jackson Township is one of twelve townships in Jackson County, Indiana, United States. As of the 2020 census, its population was 23,135 and it contained 9,327 housing units.

Historical population
Census	Pop.	Note	%±
1890	6,502		—
1900	7,640		17.5%
1910	7,607		−0.4%
1920	8,512		11.9%
1930	8,803		3.4%
1940	10,395		18.1%
1950	11,711		12.7%
1960	12,879		10.0%
1970	13,920		8.1%
1980	15,784		13.4%
1990	16,369		3.7%
2000	19,578		19.6%
2010	20,042		2.4%
2020	23,135		15.4%
Source: US Decennial Census

== History ==
Bell Ford Post Patented Diagonal "Combination Bridge", Low Spur Archeological Site (12J87), and Sand Hill Archeological Site 12J62 are listed on the National Register of Historic Places.

== Geography ==
According to the 2010 census, the township has a total area of 34.78 square miles (90.1 km^{2}), of which 34.44 square miles (89.2 km^{2}) (or 99.02%) is land and 0.34 square miles (0.88 km^{2}) (or 0.98%) is water. The streams of Buck Creek, Heddy Run, Myers Branch, Sandy Branch and South Fork Creek run through this township.

=== Cities and towns ===
- Seymour (vast majority)

=== Unincorporated towns ===
- Hangman Crossing
- Kriete Corner
- New Farmington

=== Adjacent townships ===
- Redding Township (north)
- Spencer Township, Jennings County (east)
- Washington Township (south)
- Brownstown Township (west)
- Hamilton Township (west)

=== Cemeteries ===
The township contains six cemeteries: Crane, Driftwood, Farmington, Gardner, Lutheran and Saint Ambrose.

=== Major highways ===
- Interstate 65
- U.S. Route 31
- U.S. Route 50
- State Road 11
- State Road 258

=== Airports and landing strips ===
- Freeman Municipal Airport
