= Jackson County Courthouse (Indiana) =

- U.S. National Register of Historic Places
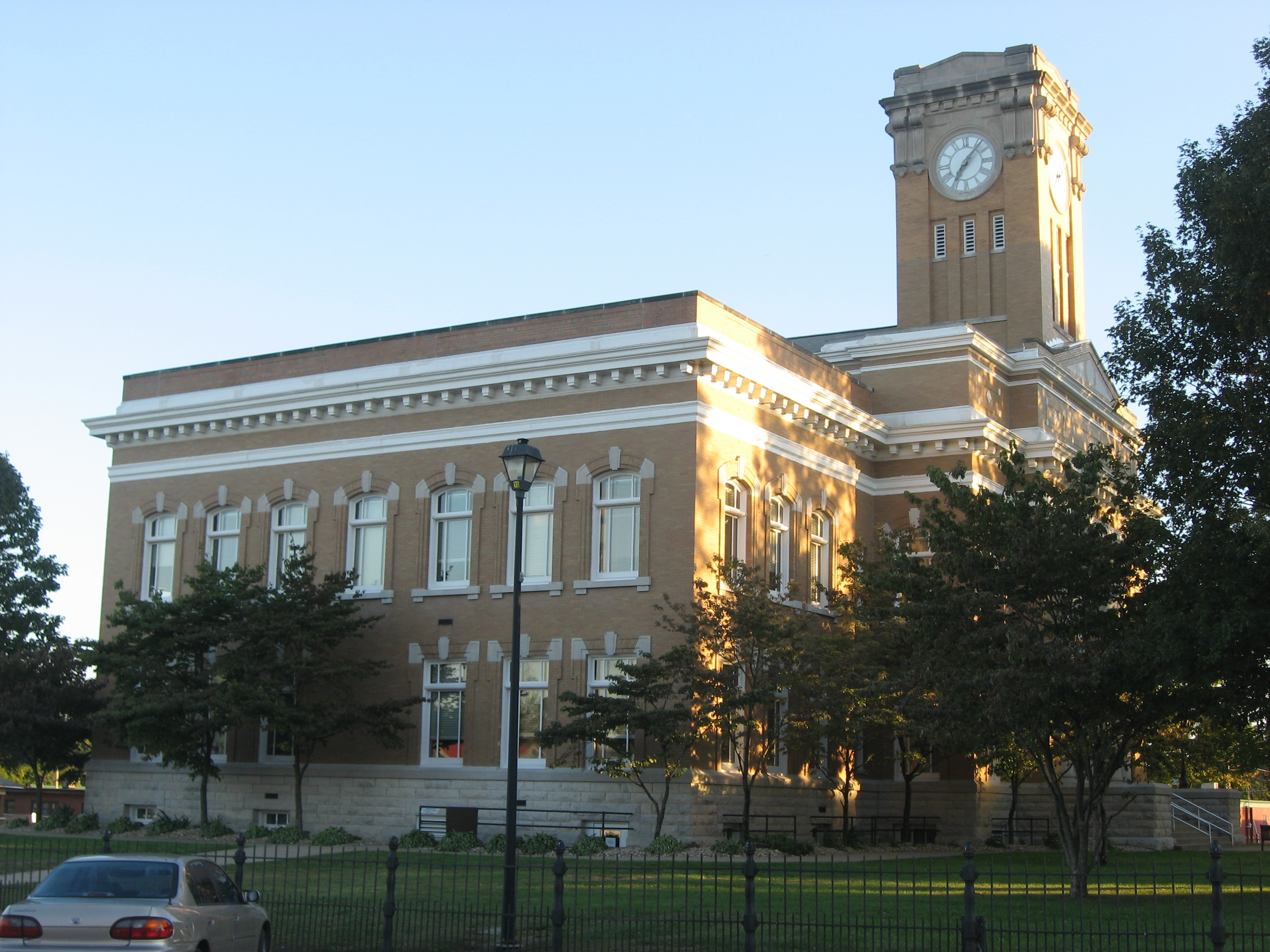
- Jackson County Courthouse, September 2011

- Location within Indiana Location within the United States
- Location: 111 S. Main St., Brownstown, Indiana
- Coordinates: 38°52′42″N 86°02′29″W
- Area: 2.886 acres (1.168 ha)
- Built: 1870, 1911
- Architect: Dunlap, Elmer E.
- Architectural style: Classical Revival
- NRHP reference No.: 11000911
- Added to NRHP: December 15, 2011

Jackson County Courthouse is a historic courthouse located at Brownstown, Indiana. The original building was built in 1870, and extensively remodeled by Elmer E. Dunlap in the Classical Revival style in 1911. It is a two-story, brick and limestone building consisting of a rectangular main central section with two flanking wings. The building features a four-sided clock tower. Located on the courthouse grounds are the contributing Sherman M-4 memorial tank, the town water pump and bell, and a cast iron fence (1872).

It was listed on the National Register of Historic Places in 2011.
