= Brownstown Township, Jackson County, Indiana =

Brownstown Township
- Township
- Location in Jackson County
- Coordinates: 38°53′26″N 86°02′49″W
- Country: United States
- State: Indiana
- County: Jackson

Government
  - Type: Indiana township

Area
  - Total: 63.62 sq mi (164.8 km^{2})
  - Land: 62.72 sq mi (162.4 km^{2})
  - Water: 0.9 sq mi (2.3 km^{2}) 1.41%
- Elevation: 551 ft (168 m)

Population (2020)
  - Total: 5,664
  - Density: 90.31/sq mi (34.87/km^{2})
- GNIS feature ID: 0453143
- Website: brownstowntownshipindiana.com

Brownstown Township is one of twelve townships in Jackson County, Indiana, United States. At the 2020 census, its population was 5,664 and it contained 2,318 housing units.

Historical population
Census	Pop.	Note	%±
1890	3,306		—
1900	3,535		6.9%
1910	3,132		−11.4%
1920	3,127		−0.2%
1930	3,293		5.3%
1940	3,463		5.2%
1950	3,620		4.5%
1960	3,776		4.3%
1970	4,134		9.5%
1980	4,650		12.5%
1990	4,963		6.7%
2000	5,301		6.8%
2010	5,552		4.7%
2020	5,664		2.0%
Source: US Decennial Census

== History ==
Brownstown Township was organized in 1817, and took its name from Brownstown, the county seat. Shields' Mill Covered Bridge was listed on the National Register of Historic Places in 2016.

== Geography ==
According to the 2010 census, the township has a total area of 63.62 square miles (164.8 km^{2}), of which 62.72 square miles (162.4 km^{2}) (or 98.59%) is land and 0.9 square miles (2.3 km^{2}) (or 1.41%) is water. The streams of Ballard Creek, Hough Creek, Kiper Creek, Spray Creek, West Branch White Creek and White Creek run through this township.

=== Cities and towns ===
- Brownstown (the county seat)

=== Unincorporated towns ===
- Ewing
- New Elizabethtown
- Vallonia (part)

=== Adjacent townships ===
- Hamilton Township (northeast)
- Jackson Township (east)
- Washington Township (east)
- Grassy Fork Township (southeast)
- Carr Township (southwest)
- Driftwood Township (southwest)
- Owen Township (west)
- Pershing Township (northwest)

=== Cemeteries ===
The township contains ten cemeteries: Burrell, Durland, First German Presbyterian, Miller, Robertson, Saint Pauls, Smallwood, Wayman, Weathers and Woodmansee.

=== Major highways ===
- U.S. Route 50
- State Road 39
- State Road 135
- State Road 250

== Education ==
Brownstown Township residents may obtain a free library card from the Brownstown Public Library in Downtown Brownstown.
