= Westside Historic District (Amherst, Massachusetts) =

Historic district in Massachusetts, United States

- U.S. National Register of Historic Places
- U.S. Historic district
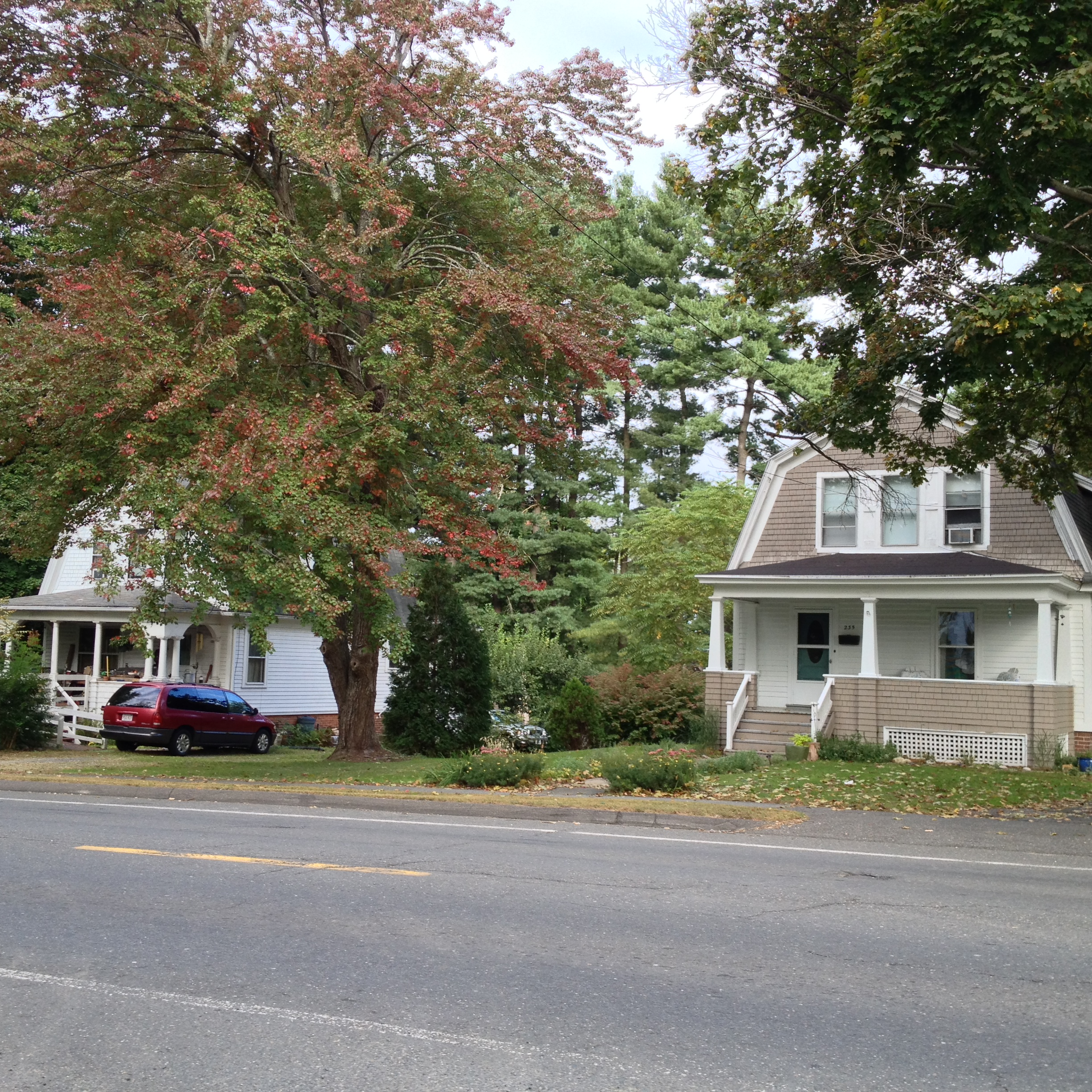
- Northampton Road (Rt. 9) at Snell Street

- Location within Massachusetts Location within the United States
- Location: Baker and Snell Sts., Northampton Rd., and Hazel Ave., Amherst, Massachusetts
- Coordinates: 42°22′0″N 72°31′51″W
- Area: 40 acres (16 ha)
- Architect: Allen & Allen
- Architectural style: Bungalow/Craftsman, Colonial Revival
- NRHP reference No.: 00000793
- Added to NRHP: July 25, 2000

The Westside Historic District is a residential historic district that encompasses an early, historically African-American neighborhood in the town of Amherst, Massachusetts. It includes properties on Baker and Snell Streets, Hazel Avenue, and Northampton Road (Massachusetts Route 9). Most of the properties in the district are houses, many of which were built in a variety of Victorian styles, with houses built later also showing Colonial Revival styling. The oldest houses, on Baker Street, date from 1869 into the 1870s, while those along Route 9 were for the most part built later, and exhibit a wider variety of styles, including some Bungalow/Craftsman houses. The fields that surround the neighborhood and set it off from the surrounding area are also included in the district, which was listed on the National Register of Historic Places in 2000.

African Americans, both enslaved and free, are known to have been resident in Amherst since the 18th century, although exactly where they lived is not known. The area around Baker and Snell Streets and Hazel Avenue is one of the oldest known, with documented African-American residency in the 1860s. The Baker Street houses are examples of modest Victorian styling, although some have had modern siding applied. The house at 21 Hazel Street is the district's only example of an American Foursquare, with a hip roof. Most of the residents of this area were engaged in relatively low-skilled or low-wage occupations, including letter carrier, maid, janitor, and farmhand.

== See also ==
- National Register of Historic Places listings in Hampshire County, Massachusetts
