= Medora, Indiana =

- Town
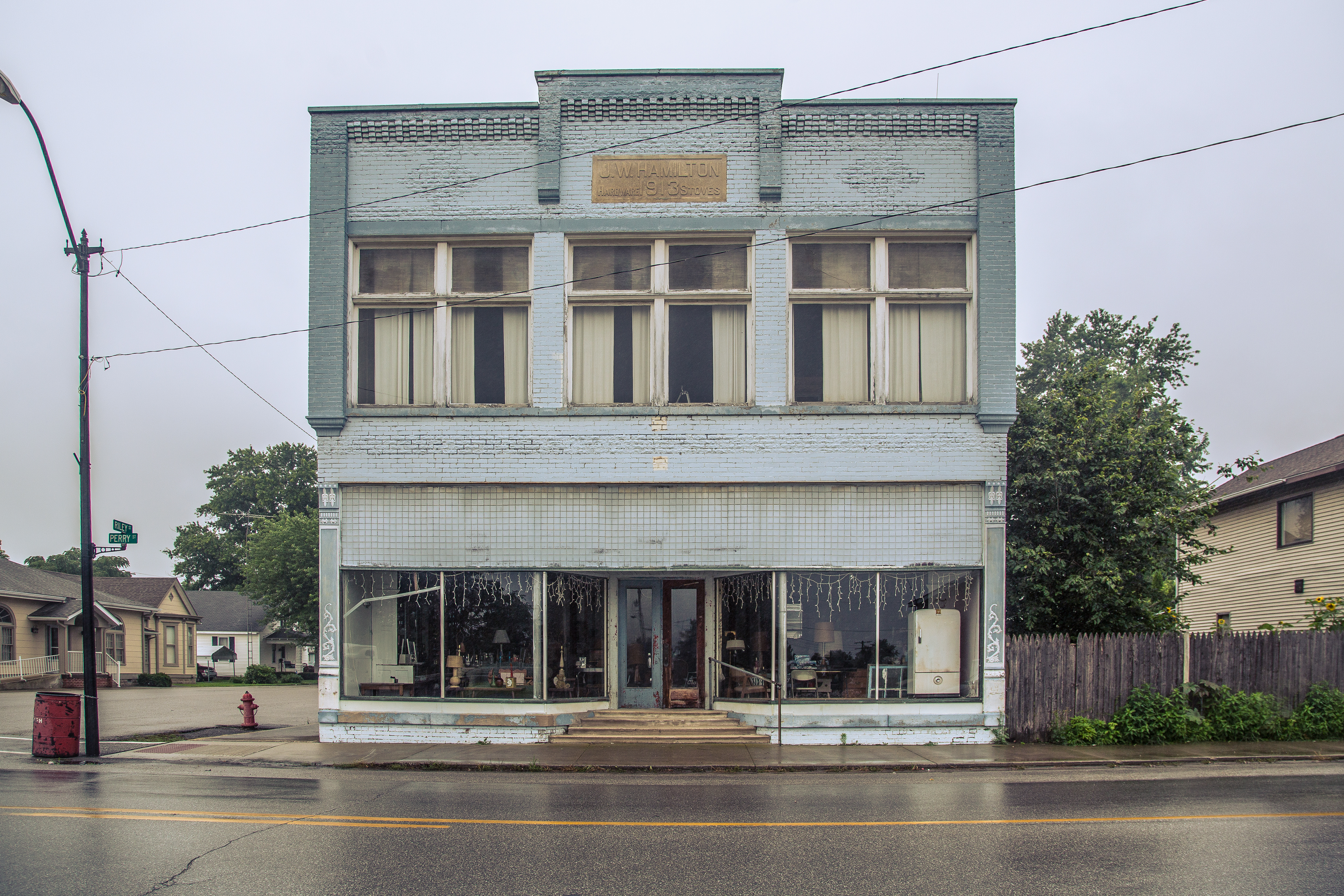

- Logo

- Location of Medora in Jackson County, Indiana.
- Coordinates: 38°49′29″N 86°10′16″W
- Country: United States
- State: Indiana
- County: Jackson
- Township: Carr

Area
  - Total: 0.31 sq mi (0.79 km^{2})
  - Land: 0.31 sq mi (0.79 km^{2})
  - Water: 0 sq mi (0.00 km^{2})
- Elevation: 528 ft (161 m)

Population (2020)
  - Total: 635
  - Density: 2,086.0/sq mi (805.41/km^{2})
- Time zone: UTC-5 (Eastern (EST))
  - Summer (DST): UTC-4 (EDT)
- ZIP code: 47260
- Area code: 812
- FIPS code: 18-48240
- GNIS feature ID: 2396748
- Website: www.townofmedora.com

Medora is a town in Carr Township, Jackson County, Indiana, United States. As of the 2020 census, Medora had a population of 635.

== History ==
Medora was laid out in 1853 by West Lee Wright in the southeast corner of a square mile of land which he owned. Wright named the town Medora (pronounced Me Doe Rae) for the musical notes & dubbed it "The Town of Harmony", though it is commonly mispronounced in the most unharmonious way today. It consisted of 10 blocks and 209 lots.

Medora is the setting of John Mellencamp's "Hurts So Good" music video.

== Geography ==
According to the 2010 census, Medora has a total area of 0.33 square miles (0.85 km^{2}), all land.

== Demographics ==
Historical population
Census	Pop.	Note	%±
1920	659		—
1930	654		−0.8%
1940	722		10.4%
1950	627		−13.2%
1960	716		14.2%
1970	788		10.1%
1980	853		8.2%
1990	805		−5.6%
2000	565		−29.8%
2010	693		22.7%
2020	635		−8.4%
U.S. Decennial Census

=== 2010 census ===
As of the census of 2010, there were 693 people, 279 households, and 188 families living in the town. The population density was 2,100.0 inhabitants per square mile (810.8/km^{2}). There were 315 housing units at an average density of 954.5 per square mile (368.5/km^{2}). The racial makeup of the town was 97.3% White, 0.1% African American, 0.1% Native American, 0.4% Pacific Islander, and 2.0% from two or more races. Hispanic or Latino of any race were 1.0% of the population.

There were 279 households, of which 33.0% had children under the age of 18 living with them, 45.9% were married couples living together, 15.8% had a female householder with no husband present, 5.7% had a male householder with no wife present, and 32.6% were non-families. 26.5% of all households were made up of individuals, and 12.9% had someone living alone who was 65 years of age or older. The average household size was 2.48 and the average family size was 3.03.

The median age in the town was 38.6 years. 26.1% of residents were under the age of 18; 8.1% were between the ages of 18 and 24; 24.1% were from 25 to 44; 24.6% were from 45 to 64; and 17% were 65 years of age or older. The gender makeup of the town was 49.8% male and 50.2% female.

=== 2000 census ===
As of the census of 2000, there were 565 people, 239 households, and 163 families living in the town. The population density was 1,773.5 inhabitants per square mile (684.8/km^{2}). There were 257 housing units at an average density of 806.7 per square mile (311.5/km^{2}). The racial makeup of the town was 99.65% White, and 0.35% from two or more races. Hispanic or Latino of any race were 0.88% of the population.

There were 239 households, out of which 29.7% had children who were under the age of 18 living with them, 45.6% were married couples living together, 18.4% had a female householder with no husband present, and 31.4% were non-families. 27.6% of all households were made up of individuals, and 15.5% had someone living alone who was 65 years of age or older. The average household size was 2.36 and the average family size was 2.85.

In the town, the population was spread out, with 25.5% under the age of 18, 8.5% from 18 to 24, 27.6% from 25 to 44, 21.6% from 45 to 64, and 16.8% who were 65 years of age or older. The median age was 36 years. For every 100 females, there were 86.5 males. For every 100 females age 18 and over, there were 76.2 males.

The median income for a household in the town was $27,813, and the median income for a family was $31,111. Males had a median income of $23,646 versus $20,288 for females. The per capita income for the town was $13,262. About 7.2% of families and 10.9% of the population were below the poverty line, including 10.7% of those under age 18 and 13.2% of those age 65 or over.

== Education ==
Medora has a public library, a branch of the Jackson County Public Library.
