= Brownstown, Indiana =

- Town
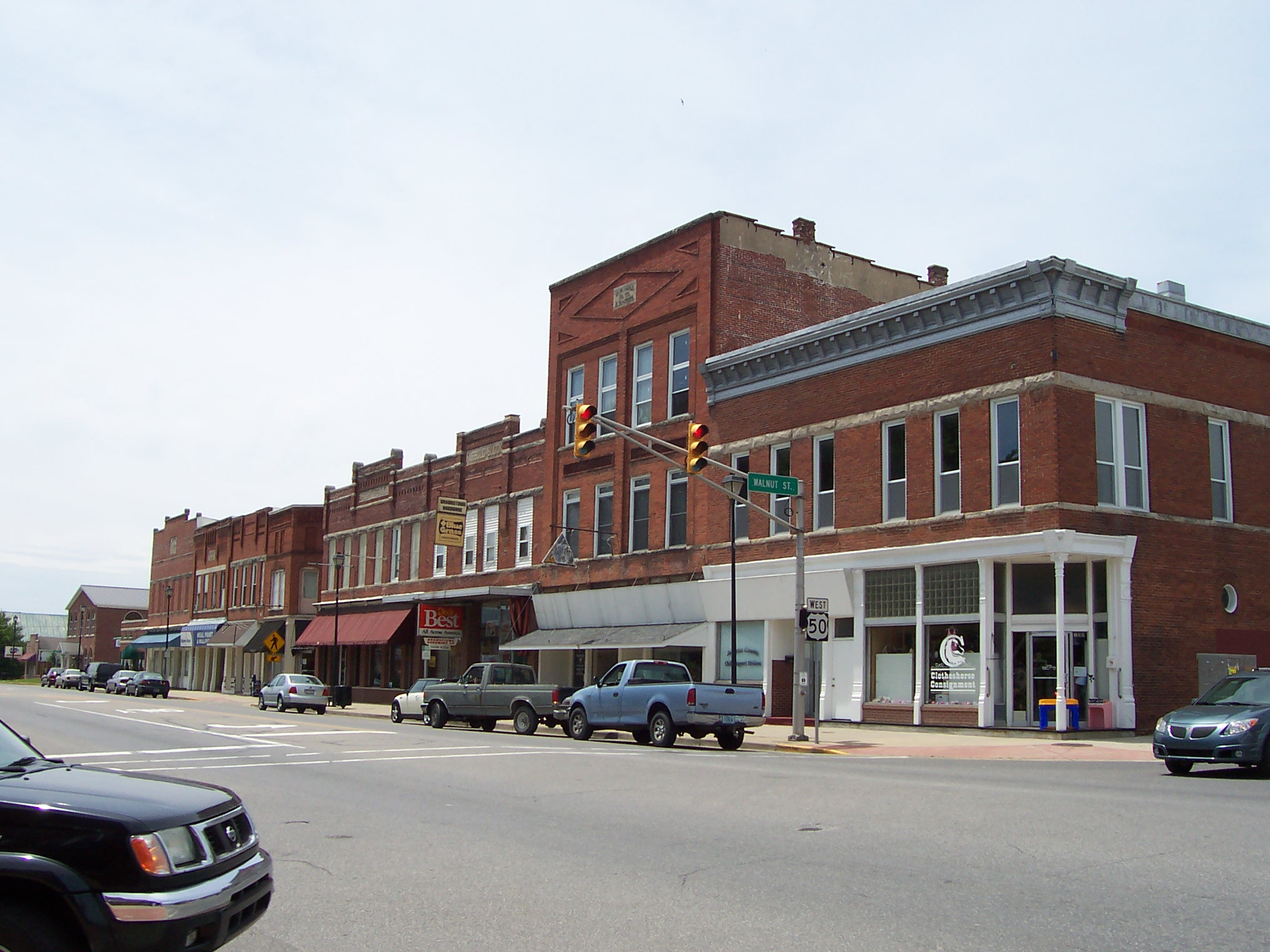
- Historic Downtown Main Street

- Location of Brownstown in Jackson County, Indiana.
- Coordinates: 38°52′40″N 86°02′48″W
- Country: United States
- State: Indiana
- County: Jackson
- Township: Brownstown

Area
  - Total: 1.63 sq mi (4.21 km^{2})
  - Land: 1.62 sq mi (4.19 km^{2})
  - Water: 0.0039 sq mi (0.01 km^{2})
- Elevation: 656 ft (200 m)

Population (2020)
  - Total: 3,025
  - Density: 1,868.9/sq mi (721.59/km^{2})
- Time zone: UTC-5 (EST)
  - Summer (DST): UTC-5 (EST)
- ZIP code: 47220
- Area code: 812
- FIPS code: 18-08470
- GNIS feature ID: 2396612
- Website: www.explorebrownstown.com

Brownstown is a town within Brownstown Township and the county seat of Jackson County, Indiana, United States. As of the 2020 census, Brownstown had a population of 3,025. It was named for Jacob Brown, a general of the War of 1812.

== History ==
The town of Brownstown was platted on April 8, 1816, notably prior to the statehood of Indiana itself. Brownstown became the county seat of Jackson County in November 1816, replacing Fort Vallonia, which had only been the county seat since June of that year. The land for the Jackson County Court House, which rests in the heart of Brownstown on the square, was donated by Col. John Ketcham (1782–1865) for this specific function.

The Jackson County Courthouse was listed on the National Register of Historic Places in 2011.

== Geography ==
According to the 2010 census, Brownstown has a total area of 1.6 square miles (4.14 km^{2}), of which 1.59 square miles (4.12 km^{2}) (or 99.38%) is land and 0.01 square miles (0.03 km^{2}) (or 0.63%) is water.

Brownstown lies on the East Fork of the White River, bordered by the Jackson-Washington State Forest and near the Hoosier National Forest.

== Demographics ==
Historical population
Census	Pop.	Note	%±
1860	504		—
1870	572		13.5%
1880	849		48.4%
1890	1,422		67.5%
1900	1,685		18.5%
1910	1,492		−11.5%
1920	1,554		4.2%
1930	1,758		13.1%
1940	1,860		5.8%
1950	1,998		7.4%
1960	2,158		8.0%
1970	2,376		10.1%
1980	2,704		13.8%
1990	2,872		6.2%
2000	2,978		3.7%
2010	2,947		−1.0%
2020	3,025		2.6%
U.S. Decennial Census

=== 2020 census ===
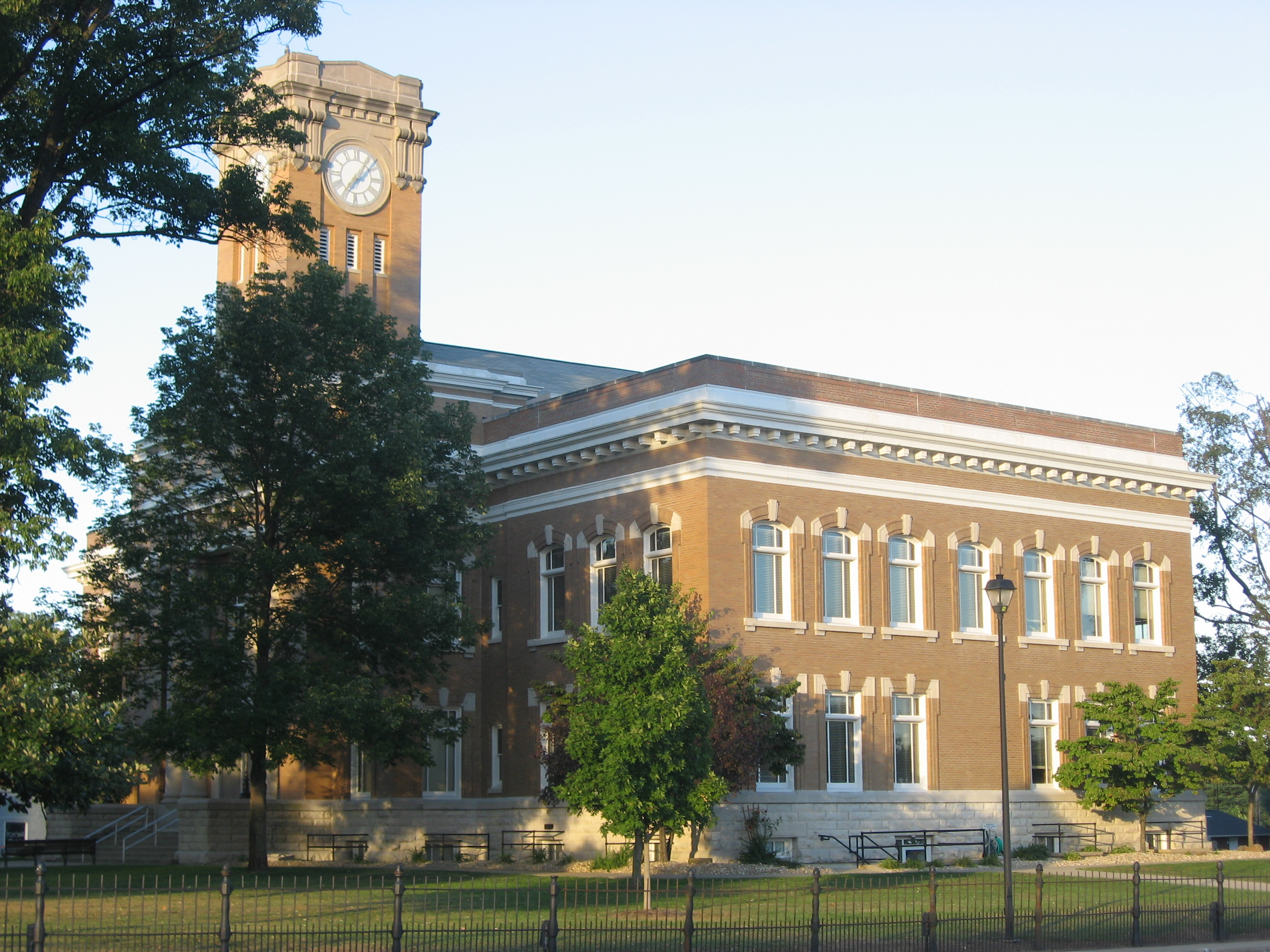
Jackson County Courthouse

As of the 2020 census, Brownstown had a population of 3,025. The median age was 39.1 years. 25.2% of residents were under the age of 18 and 20.6% of residents were 65 years of age or older. For every 100 females there were 83.4 males, and for every 100 females age 18 and over there were 77.6 males age 18 and over.

0.0% of residents lived in urban areas, while 100.0% lived in rural areas.

There were 1,212 households in Brownstown, of which 31.2% had children under the age of 18 living in them. Of all households, 41.9% were married-couple households, 15.8% were households with a male householder and no spouse or partner present, and 34.8% were households with a female householder and no spouse or partner present. About 32.5% of all households were made up of individuals and 18.1% had someone living alone who was 65 years of age or older.

There were 1,305 housing units, of which 7.1% were vacant. The homeowner vacancy rate was 1.8% and the rental vacancy rate was 4.5%.

Racial composition as of the 2020 census
Race	Number	Percent
White	2,862	94.6%
Black or African American	0	0.0%
American Indian and Alaska Native	4	0.1%
Asian	4	0.1%
Native Hawaiian and Other Pacific Islander	1	0.0%
Some other race	16	0.5%
Two or more races	138	4.6%
Hispanic or Latino (of any race)	77	2.5%

=== 2010 census ===
As of the census of 2010, there were 2,947 people, 1,175 households, and 792 families living in the town. The population density was 1,853.5 inhabitants per square mile (715.6/km^{2}). There were 1,282 housing units at an average density of 806.3 per square mile (311.3/km^{2}). The racial makeup of the town was 98.3% White, 0.1% African American, 0.3% Native American, 0.2% Asian, 0.1% Pacific Islander, 0.3% from other races, and 0.8% from two or more races. Hispanic or Latino of any race were 1.0% of the population.

There were 1,175 households, of which 34.7% had children under the age of 18 living with them, 48.3% were married couples living together, 15.0% had a female householder with no husband present, 4.2% had a male householder with no wife present, and 32.6% were non-families. 29.0% of all households were made up of individuals, and 14.8% had someone living alone who was 65 years of age or older. The average household size was 2.42 and the average family size was 2.97.

The median age in the town was 38.7 years. 25.7% of residents were under the age of 18; 8% were between the ages of 18 and 24; 24.2% were from 25 to 44; 23.5% were from 45 to 64; and 18.6% were 65 years of age or older. The gender makeup of the town was 48.2% male and 51.8% female.

=== 2000 census ===
As of the census of 2000, there were 3,000 people, 1,168 households, and 805 families living in the town. The population density was 2,080.6 inhabitants per square mile (803.3/km^{2}). There were 1,242 housing units at an average density of 867.7 per square mile (335.0/km^{2}). The racial makeup of the town was 98.76% White, 0.10% African American, 0.24% Native American, 0.24% Asian, 0.10% Pacific Islander, 0.07% from other races, and 0.50% from two or more races. Hispanic or Latino of any race were 0.60% of the population.

There were 1,168 households, out of which 34.6% had children under the age of 18 living with them, 49.7% were married couples living together, 16.4% had a female householder with no husband present, and 31.0% were non-families. 28.0% of all households were made up of individuals, and 14.0% had someone living alone who was 65 years of age or older. The average household size was 2.43 and the average family size was 2.96.

In the town, the population was spread out, with 26.8% under the age of 18, 8.8% from 18 to 24, 27.8% from 25 to 44, 19.4% from 45 to 64, and 17.3% who were 65 years of age or older. The median age was 36 years. For every 100 females, there were 85.1 males. For every 100 females age 18 and over, there were 76.7 males.

The median income for a household in the town was $35,000, and the median income for a family was $39,044. Males had a median income of $27,984 versus $21,503 for females. The per capita income for the town was $15,525. About 8.9% of families and 11.7% of the population were below the poverty line, including 18.0% of those under age 18 and 6.2% of those age 65 or over.

== Education ==
The town has a lending library, the Brownstown Public Library, along with three main public schools: an elementary, middle, and high school. The town also has a private Lutheran elementary and middle school.
