= Jackson County, Indiana =

County in Indiana, United States

- County
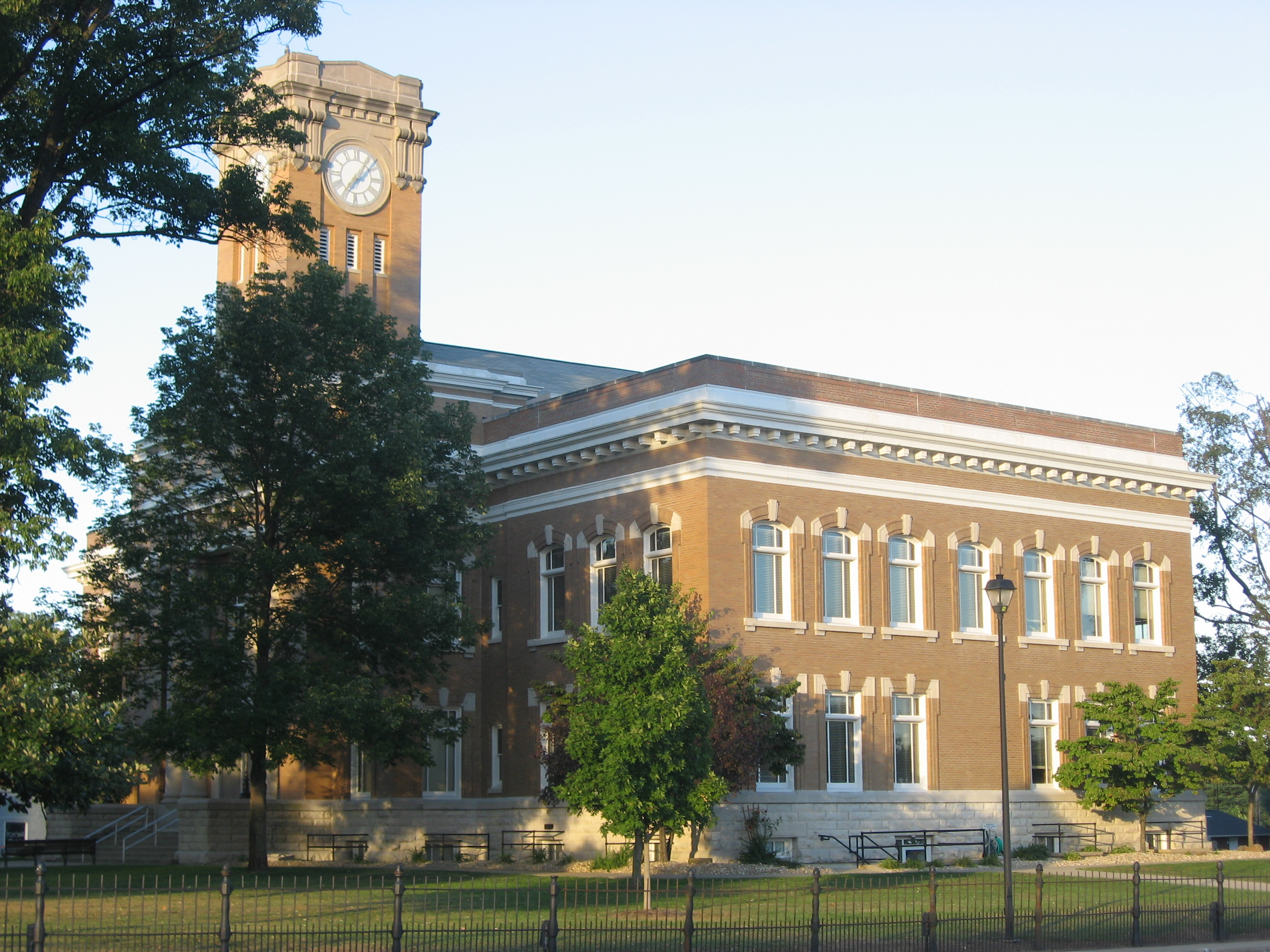
- Southern face of Jackson County Courthouse in Brownstown

- Location within the U.S. state of Indiana
- Coordinates: 38°55′N 86°02′W
- Country: United States
- State: Indiana
- Founded: Jan 1, 1816
- Named for: Andrew Jackson
- Seat: Brownstown
- Largest city: Seymour

Area
  - Total: 513.91 sq mi (1,331.0 km^{2})
  - Land: 509.31 sq mi (1,319.1 km^{2})
  - Water: 4.60 sq mi (11.9 km^{2}) 0.90%

Population (2020)
  - Total: 46,428
  - Estimate (2025): 47,370 ▲
  - Density: 91.159/sq mi (35.197/km^{2})
- Time zone: UTC−5 (Eastern)
  - Summer (DST): UTC−4 (EDT)
- Congressional district: 9th
- Website: www.jacksoncounty.in.gov
- Indiana county number 36

Jackson County is a county located in the U.S. state of Indiana. As of 2020, the population was 46,428. The county seat is Brownstown.

== History ==
=== Geography and geology ===
The 1886 county history describes Jackson County as lying across a transition in the bedrock of southern Indiana. The oldest formation exposed in the county is a black shale, above which lies the Kinderhook group at the base of the carboniferous formation, made up of shales and sandstones with beds of geodes. The St. Louis oolitic limestone appears in the county and was quarried in large blocks for building purposes, while sandstones were quarried for foundations; nodular ironstone beds once prompted an unsuccessful attempt to mine iron, abandoned for lack of funds.

=== County formation ===
Jackson County was created by an act of the Indiana Territorial legislature and, after January 1, 1816, was "known and designated by the name and style of the County of Jackson," in honor of General Andrew Jackson. As first formed, the county was reduced when a tier of sections was transferred to Lawrence County and other land was taken on the organization of Jennings County later in 1816.

The associate judges of Jackson County—Joseph Kitchell and John Ketchum—first met at the town of Vallonia on the third Monday of January 1816, where John Millroy qualified as clerk and recorder and Wickliffe Kitchell as sheriff. The legislature's commissioners reported on May 15, 1816, that they had selected a 150-acre site in Section 14, Township 5, Range 4, purchased from John Ketchum at $8 an acre, and the county court ordered that the permanent seat of justice be called Brownstown, appointing Millroy agent to sell lots.

=== Early settlement ===
Among the county's earliest settlers were Captain John Berry, who arrived in 1808, along with Thomas Ewing, James Rogers, Michael Beem, Alexander Craig, and William Graham, all of whom came between 1808 and 1811. During the War of 1812 period, settlers in the southern part of the county clustered for protection at Fort Vallonia; the county history records that a settler named Vandover was killed by Native raiders while working a field in 1812, and that Robert Sturgeon was shot and scalped near Vallonia the same year.

=== Slavery and the early courts ===
Although the Northwest Ordinance and Indiana's 1816 constitution prohibited slavery, the institution was tested in the county's early courts. In August 1819, a jury empaneled at Brownstown in the case of a man named Lee White, who claimed an enslaved man called Bill, returned a verdict finding Bill to be White's property and authorizing White to take him to Kentucky. The county history notes that several later freedom suits brought by Black residents succeeded—except where the person was a fugitive from another state—and that earlier attempts to maintain slavery in the county through extended apprenticeship were struck down after the Indiana Supreme Court ruled the practice unlawful.

== Civil War ==
During the American Civil War, Jackson County raised several companies for the Union Army, including units that formed part of the 50th Indiana Infantry Regiment and a company organized at Medora for the 25th Indiana. The region's strong Copperhead sentiment also produced friction: in September 1862, Jason B. Brown—later a U.S. Representative—was arrested at Seymour on a recruiting officer's charge of using "treasonable language" in a public speech, though the charge was dismissed without trial. In July 1863, the county became part of the response to Morgan's Raid, as Union forces gathered at Seymour to guard the railroad crossings against Confederate cavalry under John Hunt Morgan. By the war's end, Seymour and Jackson County had furnished a total of 2,571 volunteers to the Union cause.

=== Reno Gang era ===
The county was the home of the Reno Gang, and the 1886 county history devotes a chapter to "the dark days of 1865 to 1868" of lawlessness in and around Seymour. Situated at the junction of two major railways linking Cincinnati, St. Louis, Louisville, and Indianapolis, the town drew thieves, counterfeiters, and confidence men who preyed on returning soldiers.

On October 6, 1866, the Reno Gang robbed an Ohio and Mississippi Railway train a short distance east of Seymour, an event often described as the first robbery of a moving train in the United States during peacetime. The county history, which does not use that superlative, records that the robbers rifled one safe of about $15,000 but that a second safe holding roughly $30,000, rolled from the moving car, was recovered intact after the gang was pursued.

The gang's largest theft came on the night of May 22, 1868, at Marshfield, an isolated water station about twenty miles south of Seymour, where robbers overpowered the train crew, uncoupled the express car, and made off with about $90,000. A final attempt at Brownstown on July 10, 1868, failed when a trusted engineer secretly alerted the authorities and hidden guards drove the robbers off.

These crimes provoked a vigilance committee that carried out a series of lynchings. On July 20, 1868, a masked mob stopped a train about two miles west of Seymour and hanged three captured gang members from a beech tree beside the tracks. On the early morning of December 12, 1868, a band presumed to be from Jackson County took Frank, Simeon, and William Reno and Charles Anderson from the New Albany jail—where they awaited trial—and hanged them from the building's interior stairway. Of the five Reno brothers, John was imprisoned in Missouri and survived, and Clinton Reno, a farmer never accused of the gang's crimes, also survived.

=== Towns and covered bridges ===
The county seat, Brownstown, was platted on the 1816 county-seat tract. Medora was laid out by the Beem brothers in 1858. The town of Crothersville, in Vernon Township, began as a station on the Jeffersonville, Madison and Indianapolis Railroad originally named Haysville and was renamed at the suggestion of a Dr. Crothers.

The first covered bridge in Jackson County is said to have been built at Newry in 1860 as a private toll bridge, at a cost of about $500. The county later became home to the Medora Covered Bridge, among the longest three-span covered bridges in the world; following a complete refurbishment, the nearby town of Medora holds an annual event at the bridge, which is open to pedestrians. Another covered bridge, the Bells Ford Bridge—believed to have been the last remaining Post Truss bridge in the world—collapsed into the White River on January 2, 2006, after years of neglect.

== Geography ==
According to the 2010 census, the county has a total area of 513.91 square miles (1,331.0 km^{2}), of which 509.31 square miles (1,319.1 km^{2}) (or 99.10%) is land and 4.60 square miles (11.9 km^{2}) (or 0.90%) is water.

=== Cities ===
- Seymour

=== Towns ===
- Brownstown
- Crothersville
- Medora

=== Census-designated places ===
- Cortland*
- Freetown*
- Rockford*
- Vallonia*

=== Other unincorporated places ===
- Kurtz
- Norman Station
- Tampico
- Uniontown

=== Townships ===
- Brownstown
- Carr
- Driftwood
- Grassy Fork
- Hamilton
- Jackson
- Owen
- Pershing
- Redding
- Salt Creek
- Vernon
- Washington

=== Adjacent counties ===
- Brown County (north-northwest)
- Bartholomew County (north-northeast)
- Jennings County (east)
- Scott County (southeast)
- Washington County (south)
- Lawrence County (west)
- Monroe County (northwest)

=== Major highways ===
Sources: National Atlas, U.S. Census Bureau

- Interstate 65
- U.S. Route 31
- U.S. Route 50
- State Road 11
- State Road 39
- State Road 58
- State Road 135
- State Road 235
- State Road 250
- State Road 256
- State Road 258

=== National protected areas ===
- Hoosier National Forest (part)
- Muscatatuck National Wildlife Refuge (part)

== Climate and weather ==
Brownstown, Indiana

Climate chart (precipitation, max. and min. temperature)
J	F	M	A	M	J	J	A	S	O	N	D
3.2 37 19	2.8 43 22	3.7 53 31	4.7 64 40	5 74 51	4.1 82 60	4.4 85 64	4.4 84 61	3 78 53	3.3 67 40	4.1 54 33	3.4 42 24
- █ Average max. and min. temperatures in °F
- █ Precipitation totals in inches
- Source: The Weather Channel
Metric conversion
J	F	M	A	M	J	J	A	S	O	N	D
81 3 −7	72 6 −6	95 12 −1	120 18 4	127 23 11	105 28 16	112 29 18	111 29 16	77 26 12	83 19 4	103 12 1	87 6 −4
- █ Average max. and min. temperatures in °C
- █ Precipitation totals in mm

In recent years, average temperatures in Brownstown have ranged from a low of 19 °F (−7 °C) in January to a high of 85 °F (29 °C) in July, although a record low of −23 °F (−31 °C) was recorded in January 1977 and a record high of 106 °F (41 °C) was recorded in July 1954. Average monthly precipitation ranged from 2.84 inches (72 mm) in February to 5.01 inches (127 mm) in May.

== Politics ==
Prior to 1952, Jackson County was a Democratic stronghold voting Republican only twice since 1888. But starting with the 1952 election it has become a Republican stronghold with Lyndon B. Johnson in 1964 being the last Democrat to win the county, but Jimmy Carter came within just 5 votes of carrying the county in 1976.

United States presidential election results for Jackson County, Indiana
Year	Republican		Democratic		Third party(ies)	
Year	No.	%	No.	%	No.	%
1888	2,263	40.89%	3,235	58.45%	37	0.67%
1892	2,233	39.24%	3,363	59.09%	95	1.67%
1896	2,670	42.43%	3,574	56.79%	49	0.78%
1900	2,795	41.51%	3,849	57.16%	90	1.34%
1904	2,775	42.94%	3,467	53.65%	220	3.40%
1908	2,631	39.93%	3,783	57.41%	175	2.66%
1912	921	16.25%	3,225	56.91%	1,521	26.84%
1916	2,422	40.65%	3,312	55.59%	224	3.76%
1920	5,069	48.04%	5,319	50.41%	164	1.55%
1924	4,187	41.63%	5,332	53.02%	538	5.35%
1928	5,151	49.78%	5,130	49.58%	66	0.64%
1932	3,996	33.06%	7,882	65.22%	208	1.72%
1936	4,951	37.98%	8,018	61.50%	68	0.52%
1940	6,281	45.13%	7,557	54.30%	79	0.57%
1944	6,321	50.87%	5,982	48.14%	123	0.99%
1948	6,062	45.00%	7,258	53.88%	151	1.12%
1952	8,067	55.14%	6,460	44.16%	103	0.70%
1956	8,375	57.30%	6,185	42.31%	57	0.39%
1960	8,213	55.27%	6,582	44.29%	66	0.44%
1964	6,285	41.98%	8,572	57.26%	114	0.76%
1968	7,710	52.02%	5,140	34.68%	1,971	13.30%
1972	9,546	64.99%	4,984	33.93%	159	1.08%
1976	7,615	49.58%	7,610	49.55%	133	0.87%
1980	8,903	55.85%	6,425	40.30%	614	3.85%
1984	9,879	64.85%	5,163	33.89%	192	1.26%
1988	9,470	62.77%	5,550	36.78%	68	0.45%
1992	7,246	44.81%	5,663	35.02%	3,261	20.17%
1996	5,883	46.41%	5,150	40.63%	1,642	12.95%
2000	9,054	62.01%	5,330	36.50%	218	1.49%
2004	11,083	67.96%	5,092	31.22%	134	0.82%
2008	9,726	55.77%	7,354	42.17%	360	2.06%
2012	10,419	62.34%	5,838	34.93%	455	2.72%
2016	12,859	72.79%	3,843	21.75%	965	5.46%
2020	14,555	75.66%	4,302	22.36%	381	1.98%
2024	14,323	76.78%	4,015	21.52%	316	1.69%

== Demographics ==
Historical population
Census	Pop.	Note	%±
1820	4,010		—
1830	4,870		21.4%
1840	8,961		84.0%
1850	11,047		23.3%
1860	16,286		47.4%
1870	18,974		16.5%
1880	23,050		21.5%
1890	24,139		4.7%
1900	26,633		10.3%
1910	24,727		−7.2%
1920	24,228		−2.0%
1930	23,731		−2.1%
1940	26,612		12.1%
1950	28,237		6.1%
1960	30,556		8.2%
1970	33,187		8.6%
1980	36,523		10.1%
1990	37,730		3.3%
2000	41,335		9.6%
2010	42,376		2.5%
2020	46,428		9.6%
2025 (est.)	47,370	▲	2.0%
U.S. Decennial Census; 1790–1960 1900–1990; 1990–2000 2010

=== Racial and ethnic composition ===
Jackson County, Indiana – Racial and ethnic composition Note: the US Census treats Hispanic/Latino as an ethnic category. This table excludes Latinos from the racial categories and assigns them to a separate category. Hispanics/Latinos may be of any race.
Race / Ethnicity (NH = Non-Hispanic)	Pop 1980	Pop 1990	Pop 2000	Pop 2010	Pop 2020	% 1980	% 1990	% 2000	% 2010	% 2020
White alone (NH)	36,092	37,216	39,323	38,826	37,815	98.82%	98.64%	95.13%	91.62%	81.45%
Black or African American alone (NH)	129	132	217	265	485	0.35%	0.35%	0.52%	0.63%	1.04%
Native American or Alaska Native alone (NH)	50	65	93	82	68	0.14%	0.17%	0.22%	0.19%	0.15%
Asian alone (NH)	88	183	323	356	469	0.24%	0.49%	0.78%	0.84%	1.01%
Native Hawaiian or Pacific Islander alone (NH)	x	x	18	18	5	x	x	0.04%	0.04%	0.01%
Other race alone (NH)	7	12	8	25	94	0.02%	0.03%	0.02%	0.06%	0.20%
Mixed race or Multiracial (NH)	x	x	241	394	1,241	x	x	0.58%	0.93%	2.67%
Hispanic or Latino (any race)	157	122	1,112	2,410	6,251	0.43%	0.32%	2.69%	5.69%	13.46%
Total	36,523	37,730	41,335	42,376	46,428	100.00%	100.00%	100.00%	100.00%	100.00%

=== 2020 census ===
As of the 2020 census, the county had a population of 46,428. The median age was 38.6 years. 24.6% of residents were under the age of 18 and 16.8% of residents were 65 years of age or older. For every 100 females there were 100.6 males, and for every 100 females age 18 and over there were 98.6 males age 18 and over.

The racial makeup of the county was 83.4% White, 1.1% Black or African American, 1.0% American Indian and Alaska Native, 1.0% Asian, <0.1% Native Hawaiian and Pacific Islander, 6.4% from some other race, and 7.1% from two or more races. Hispanic or Latino residents of any race comprised 13.5% of the population.

52.2% of residents lived in urban areas, while 47.8% lived in rural areas.

There were 17,809 households in the county, of which 32.3% had children under the age of 18 living in them. Of all households, 49.6% were married-couple households, 18.5% were households with a male householder and no spouse or partner present, and 24.2% were households with a female householder and no spouse or partner present. About 26.2% of all households were made up of individuals and 11.4% had someone living alone who was 65 years of age or older.

There were 19,069 housing units, of which 6.6% were vacant. Among occupied housing units, 70.6% were owner-occupied and 29.4% were renter-occupied. The homeowner vacancy rate was 1.2% and the rental vacancy rate was 5.2%.

=== 2010 census ===
As of the 2010 United States census, there were 42,376 people, 16,501 households, and 11,629 families residing in the county. The population density was 83.2 inhabitants per square mile (32.1/km^{2}). There were 18,202 housing units at an average density of 35.7 per square mile (13.8/km^{2}). The racial makeup of the county was 94.5% white, 0.8% Asian, 0.7% black or African American, 0.2% American Indian, 0.1% Pacific islander, 2.4% from other races, and 1.3% from two or more races. Those of Hispanic or Latino origin made up 5.7% of the population. In terms of ancestry, 28.8% were German, 13.1% were American, 12.8% were Irish, and 9.2% were English.

Of the 16,501 households, 33.7% had children under the age of 18 living with them, 54.4% were married couples living together, 10.8% had a female householder with no husband present, 29.5% were non-families, and 24.4% of all households were made up of individuals. The average household size was 2.53 and the average family size was 2.98. The median age was 38.7 years.

The median income for a household in the county was $47,697 and the median income for a family was $53,534. Males had a median income of $38,608 versus $30,030 for females. The per capita income for the county was $21,498. About 7.6% of families and 11.1% of the population were below the poverty line, including 13.7% of those under age 18 and 6.3% of those age 65 or over.

== See also ==
- The Tribune, daily newspaper covering Jackson County
- National Register of Historic Places listings in Jackson County, Indiana
