= USS Silver Cloud (1862) =

Gunboat of the United States Navy

History

United States
- Laid down: Date unknown
- Launched: 1862
- Acquired: 1 April 1863
- Commissioned: 4 May 1863
- Decommissioned: 13 July 1865
- Stricken: 1865 (est.)
- Fate: Sold, 17 August 1865

General characteristics
- Displacement: 236 tons
- Length: 155 ft 1 in (47.27 m)
- Beam: 32 ft 2 in (9.80 m)
- Draft: 6 ft (1.8 m)
- Depth of hold: 5 ft 2 in (1.57 m)
- Propulsion: steam engine; stern wheel-propelled
- Speed: 7 mph (upstream)
- Complement: not known
- Armament: six 24-pounder Dahlgren howitzers
- Armour: tinclad

The first USS Silver Cloud was a steamer acquired by the Union Navy during the American Civil War.

She was used by the Union Navy as a gunboat in support of the Union Navy blockade of Confederate waterways.

== Commissioned at Cairo, Illinois, in 1863 ==
Silver Cloud—a wooden-hulled stern wheel steamer built in 1862 at Brownsville, Pennsylvania, was taken over by the Navy on 1 April 1863 at Cairo, Illinois; commissioned there on 4 May 1863; and was formally purchased by the Navy on 19 May 1863.

== Civil War operations ==
=== Assigned to the Mississippi Squadron ===
The gunboat (Tinclad No. 28), commanded by Acting Master Augustus F. Thompson, joined the Mississippi Squadron after it had succeeded in opening the Mississippi River and its tributaries to navigation by Union ships—naval, military, and merchant. However, since the South was not yet beaten, it was still necessary for the ships to patrol the rivers to protect Union shipping from attacks by guerrilla bands.

=== Destroying boats along the Tennessee River ===
Early in May 1863, her first assignment took her up the Tennessee River as far as Eastport, Mississippi, to destroy every boat found along the way which might be used by the Confederates to cross the river. She and her consorts USS Champion, USS Queen City, USS Covington, and USS Argosy also carried Army troops to Linden, Tennessee, for a surprise raid at dawn on the 13th. The operation was completely successful and resulted in the capture of five officers, 40 men, 50 horses, as well as their arms, supplies, and equipment.

Such operations became almost routine for Silver Cloud during the almost two remaining years of the Civil War.

=== Conveying General Sherman from Memphis to Vicksburg ===
Highlights of her service included another expedition up the Tennessee in July and an engagement with some 200 Confederate soldiers whom she drove away from Osceola, Arkansas. In mid-January 1864, she carried Gen. William Tecumseh Sherman from Memphis, Tennessee, to Vicksburg, Mississippi. On 14 April, she assisted USS New Era and Platte Valley in driving Confederate cavalry and infantry from Fort Pillow, Tennessee, which Major General Nathan Bedford Forrest had captured two days before. Late in May, she assisted USS Osage, after that river monitor had run aground at Helena Bar, Arkansas.

== Post-war operations ==
After the Confederacy collapsed, Silver Cloud operated briefly on the rivers helping to return conditions to normal.

== Decommissioning, sale, and subsequent maritime career ==
She was decommissioned at Mound City, Illinois, on 13 July 1865 and was sold at public auction there on 17 August 1865 to J. H. Sterritt. The ship was converted from a stern to a side wheeler and redocumented on 7 October 1865. She was snagged and lost on 27 February 1866 in Buffalo Bayou, Texas.

== See also ==
- Anaconda Plan
