= Cortland, Indiana =

- Unincorporated community and Census-designated place
- Location within Indiana Location within the United States
- Coordinates: 38°58′25″N 85°57′46″W
- Country: United States
- State: Indiana
- County: Jackson
- Township: Hamilton
- Elevation: 564 ft (172 m)
- ZIP code: 47228
- GNIS feature ID: 2830418

Cortland is an unincorporated community in eastern Hamilton Township, Jackson County, Indiana, United States. It lies along State Road 258, northwest of the city of Seymour. Although Cortland is unincorporated, it has a post office, with the ZIP code of 47228.

== History ==
The Cortland post office was established in 1850. Cortland was named after Cortland, New York.

Cortland used to be the home of the Jackson County Rodeo.

== Demographics ==
The United States Census Bureau delineated Cortland as a census designated place in the 2022 American Community Survey.
