= 70th Ohio Infantry Regiment =

- Active: October 14, 1861 – August 14, 1865
- Country: United States
- Allegiance: Union
- Branch: Infantry
- Engagements: Battle of Shiloh; Siege of Corinth; Siege of Vicksburg; Siege of Jackson; Chattanooga campaign; Battle of Missionary Ridge; Atlanta campaign; Battle of Resaca; Battle of Dallas; Battle of New Hope Church; Battle of Allatoona; Battle of Kennesaw Mountain; Battle of Atlanta; Siege of Atlanta; Battle of Jonesborough; Sherman's March to the Sea; Second Battle of Fort McAllister; Carolinas campaign; Battle of Bentonville

The 70th Ohio Infantry Regiment was an infantry regiment in the Union Army during the American Civil War.

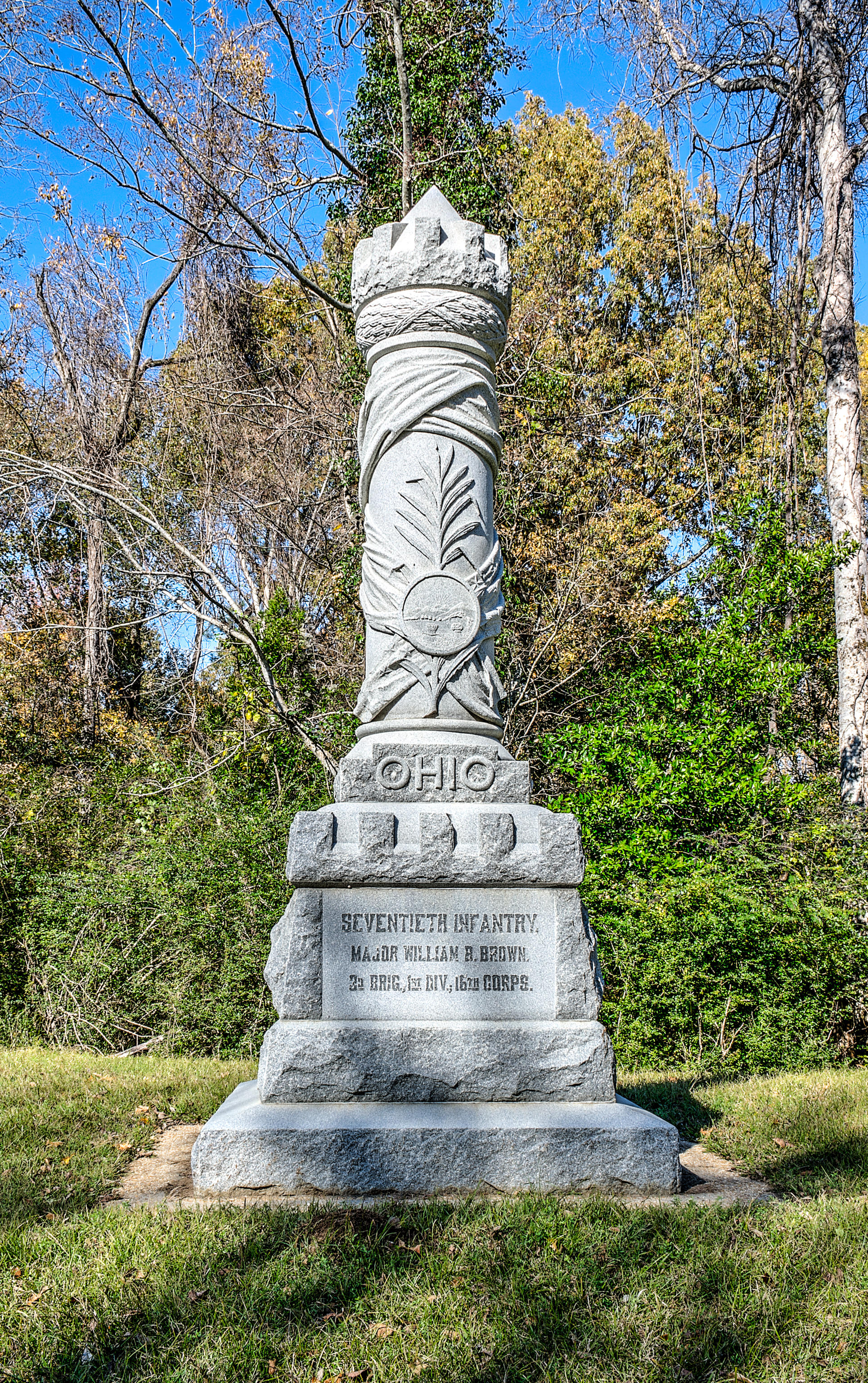
Memorial at Vicksburg National Military Park

== Service ==
The 70th Ohio Infantry Regiment was organized in West Union, Ohio and mustered in for three years service on October 14, 1861, under the command of Colonel Joseph R. Cockerill.

The regiment was attached to District of Paducah, Kentucky, to March 1862. 3rd Brigade, 5th Division, Army of the Tennessee, to July 1862. 3rd Brigade, 5th Division, District of Memphis, Tennessee, to November 1862. 3rd Brigade, 5th Division, District of Memphis, Right Wing, XIII Corps, Department of the Tennessee, November 1862. 2nd Brigade, 1st Division, District of Memphis, XIII Corps, to December 1862. 2nd Brigade, 1st Division, XVII Corps, to January 1863. 2nd Brigade, 1st Division, XVI Corps, to March 1863. 3rd Brigade, 1st Division, XVI Corps, to July 1863. 3rd Brigade, 4th Division, XV Corps, to August 1864. 1st Brigade, 4th Division, XV Corps, to September 1864. 3rd Brigade, 2nd Division, XV Corps, to July 1865. Department of Arkansas, to August 1865.

The 70th Ohio Infantry mustered out of service at Little Rock, Arkansas, on August 14, 1865.

== Detailed service ==
Moved to Ripley, Ohio, December 25, then to Paducah, Ky., February 17, 1862. Moved from Paducah, Ky., to Savannah, Tenn., March 6–10, 1862. Expedition to Yellow Creek and occupation of Pittsburg Landing, Tenn., March 14–17. Crump's Landing April 4. Battle of Shiloh, April 6–7. Advance on and siege of Corinth, Miss., April 29-May 30. Russell House, near Corinth, May 17. Occupation of Corinth May 30. March to Memphis, Tenn., via LaGrange, Grand Junction, and Holly Springs June 1-July 21. Duty at Memphis until November. Grant's Central Mississippi Campaign, operations on the Mississippi Central Railroad, November 1862 to January 1863. Moved to LaGrange, Tenn., and duty there until March 7, and at Moscow until June 9. Ordered to Vicksburg, Miss., June 9. Siege of Vicksburg June 14-July 4. Advance on Jackson, Miss., July 4–10. Bolton's Ferry, Black River, July 4–6. Siege of Jackson July 10–17. Camp at Big Black until September 26. Moved to Memphis, Tenn., then march to Chattanooga, Tenn., September 26-November 20. Chattanooga-Ringgold Campaign November 23–27. Tunnel Hill November 23–25. Missionary Ridge November 25. March to relief of Knoxville, Tenn., November 28-December 28. Regiment reenlisted January 1, 1864. Veterans on furlough February. Duty at Scottsboro, Ala., until May. Atlanta Campaign May 1-September 8. Demonstrations on Resaca May 8–13. Near Resaca May 13. Battle of Resaca May 14–15. Advance on Dallas May 18–25. Operations on line of Pumpkin Vine Creek and battles about Dallas, New Hope Church, and Allatoona Hills May 25-June 5. Operations about Marietta and against Kennesaw Mountain June 10-July 2. Brush Mountain June 15. Assault on Kennesaw June 27. Nickajack Creek July 2–5. Ruff's Mills July 3–4. Chattahoochie River July 5–17. Battle of Atlanta July 22. Siege of Atlanta July 22-August 25. Ezra Chapel July 28 (Hood's second sortie). Flank movement on Jonesborough August 25–30. Battle of Jonesborough August 31-September 1. Lovejoy's Station September 2–6. Operations against Hood in northern Georgia and northern Alabama September 29-November 3. Reconnaissance from Rome on Cave Springs Road and skirmishes October 12–13. March to the sea November 15-December 10. Statesboro December 4. Near Bryan Court House December 8. Siege of Savannah December 10–21. Fort McAllister December 13. Campaign of the Carolinas January to April 1865. Columbia, S.C., February 16–17. Battle of Bentonville, N.C., March 20–21. Occupation of Goldsboro March 24. Advance on Raleigh April 10–14. Occupation of Raleigh April 14. Bennett's House April 26. Surrender of Johnston and his army. March to Washington, D.C., via Richmond, Va., April 29-May 30. Grand Review of the Armies May 24. Moved to Louisville, Ky., June, then to Little Rock, Ark., and duty there until August 1865.

== Casualties ==
The regiment lost a total of 265 men during service; 5 officers and 70 enlisted men killed or mortally wounded, 2 officers and 188 enlisted men died of disease.

=== Civil War Memorial Grave ===
On August 21, 1865, the steamboat, USS Argosy (Number 3) was returning Union soldiers of the 70th Ohio Infantry home via the Ohio River. The steamer was forced aground by a storm. Her boilers exploded and caused ten fatalities. They were buried in a mass grave one half mile from Magnet (then called Rono, Indiana). Ten grave makers were raised at the site.

Local Perry County (Indiana) historian Bert Fenn discovered information that suggested one of the ten who was supposedly buried in the grave may have actually lived until arriving in Louisville, where he died. This could explain why one of the soldiers buried in the grave is an unknown soldier.The Civil War Memorial Grave historical marker at the site erected by the Indiana Civil War Centennial Commission in 1965.
Ironically one of the first vessels to arrive at the disaster was Steamboat USS Argosy No.27. For a picture and the later career of the USS Argosy Number 3 see the entry in Waterways Journal 2018

== Commanders ==
- Colonel Joseph R. Cockerill - resigned April 13, 1864
- Lieutenant Colonel DeWitt C. Louden - resigned August 9, 1864
- Lieutenant Colonel Henry L. Phillips - mustered out with regiment August 14, 1865
- Major William B. Brown - commanded during the siege of Vicksburg

== See also ==
- List of Ohio Civil War units
- Ohio in the Civil War
