= Claude Ferguson =

American forester and conservationist

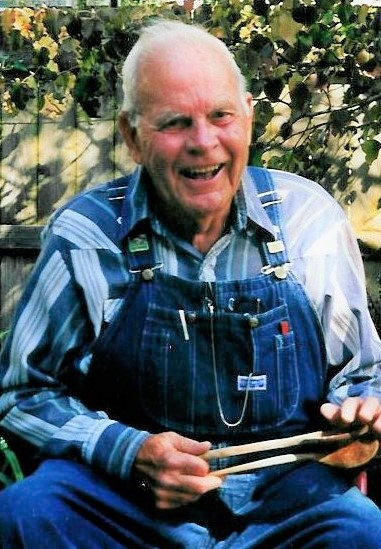
- Born: Alan Claude Ferguson; January 13, 1923; Willow Springs, Missouri
- Died: June 15, 2006; age 83; Bloomington, Indiana
- Burial place: Willow Springs City Cemetery, Willow Springs, Missouri
- Occupations: Forester, Environmentalist
- Known for: Environmental Activism, A. Claude Ferguson, Etc., et.al., vs U.S. Forest Service
- Spouse(s): Gwendolyn Pearl Wilbanks, Marjorie Fishel East
- Children: 3
- Relatives: Bob Ferguson, Musician
- Awards: Boy Scouts of America Medal for Lifesaving, U.S. Environmental Protection Agency Quality Award, Sierra Club, National Wildlife Association

Alan Claude Ferguson (January 13, 1923 – June 15, 2006), who went by A. Claude Ferguson, was an American forester, conservationist, and environmentalist.

After a 33-year career employee of the U.S. Forest Service, he chose to work with environmental groups as he joined lawsuits against his employer, the U.S. Forest Service. The protest began in 1970 against off-road vehicle trails in the Hoosier National Forest and ended in a 1976 civil servant hearing for unlawful termination and a federal lawsuit citing violations of the Forest Service Trail Standards and on land that was acquired for wildlife habitat by the Indiana Department of Natural Resources.

== Early life ==
Alan Claude Ferguson was born into a pioneer family of the Ozarks where he and his three brothers were raised on a small Jersey dairy farm in Willow Springs, Missouri. He was the second son of John Carl and Mary Willie Boles Ferguson. His father, John Carl Ferguson was active in the establishment of the Missouri Conservation Commission in the late 1920s and the 1939 enabling act for the Mark Twain National Forest in Missouri. He and his brothers, Carl, Bob and Paul would go with their father to one-room school houses where they would show their home-made movies of wildlife, streams and untouched forests to encourage the support of this legislation.

Aldo Leopold was a frequent guest in their home during his game-range survey of the north-central states. All four of the Ferguson brothers received an education and appreciation of the outdoors at the knee of Aldo.

== Career ==
Ferguson, while a senior at Willow Springs High School, joined the Forest Service in 1940. He was assigned to the Blue Buck Tower as a fire lookout on the newly founded Mark Twain National Forest in Missouri. He worked closely with the Civilian Conservation Corp as a fire control aide in the Mark Twain National Forest. After three years service in the U.S. Navy as an Aviation Radio-Radar Operator, Gunner and instructor during W.W. II he returned to the Mark Twain as a forestry aide in timber management and land acquisition.

Upon completion of his B.S. in Forestry from the University of Missouri in 1952, his first assignment as a forester was on the Nicolet National Forest in Wisconsin. Subsequent promotions included district ranger on the Shawnee National Forest in Illinois and the Hiawatha National Forest in Upper Michigan followed by a 1961 promotion to staff forester on the Ottawa National Forest in Upper Michigan. While on the Ottawa, he had staff responsibilities for the examination, appraisal and reports for the purchase of the L.P. Fisher estate later known as the Sylvania. He was again sent to the Hiawatha, Upper Michigan, in charge of lands, recreation, wildlife, soil and water before his 1964 promotion to Chief of the Branch of Cooperative Forestry Management and Chief of the Branch of Operations in the Forest Service Eastern Regional Office in Milwaukee.

In 1965, Ferguson accepted an assignment to the Bedford, Indiana regional headquarters, where he was forest supervisor for the Hoosier National Forest in Indiana and the Wayne National Forest in Ohio. The two were combined and renamed the Wayne-Hoosier National Forest in 1951, and once again separated in 1993.

He oversaw the design of a public recreation site, Hardin Ridge on Monroe Lake Reservoir, Lake Monroe.

Ferguson headed a Department of Agriculture Forest Service team with the re-introduction of wild turkeys to Indiana from his home state of Missouri. In 1963 along with the Indiana Department of Natural Resource (DNR) a trade was made for ruffled grouse for 21 wild turkeys from the Ozarks of southern Missouri.

In 1971, at his request to comply with the federal anti-nepotism law, he stepped down as forest supervisor. He assumed the position of staff forester in order to marry a forest service employee. December 20, 1976, he retired from the U.S. Forest Service.

=== DDT aerial spraying ===
The United States Department of Agriculture began a fire ant eradication program which involved aerial spraying of DDT, 2,4,5-T and 24-D - pesticide chemicals mixed with fuel oil. Ferguson was one of several forest service employees working on forest land when the testing on these new insecticides was occurring overhead. He was hospitalized in 1957 at the Washington University Medical Center in St. Louis for treatment of "dermatomyositis", a connective tissue disorder. Ferguson's case was diagnosed as extremely critical. It was later attributed to exposure to DDT. After several weeks in the hospital, Ferguson was released from the hospital to recover at home and eventually was able to return to his post at the forest service.

=== Off-road vehicles in the Hoosier National Forest ===
April 1970, Ferguson, as Forest Supervisor of the Hoosier National Forest became aware of the unauthorized use of the forest when John Buffalo using his personal 20 acres and without asking for permission or notifying the Forest Service held a 100-mile motorcycle race, the "Buffalo 100", inside the Hoosier National Forest.

Ferguson and the district ranger filmed the damage the motorcyclists caused and Ferguson presented the findings facing U.S. parks at two conferences: the 24th Great Lakes Park Training Institute and the 20th Annual Great Lakes District Conference National Park and Recreation Conference in 1970.

An interim off-road vehicle policy was established, allowing limited use of them in a small number of approved areas until October 8, 1970, when the Hoosier National Forest was temporarily closed to all ORV use, pending the results of further studies.

During this time, Ferguson stepped down as forest supervisor to staff forester and Don Girton was brought in as the new forest supervisor.

Despite an incomplete environmental impact statement and public hearings, Hoosier National Forest Supervisor Don Girton made the decision to proceed with a policy of allowing ORV use to take effect as early as September, 1972.

In December 1972, the State of Indiana published its report that ORV use was not compatible with the natural purposes of state properties. On the federal side, the Forest Service decided in 1973 to again allow use in limited terrains.

Trail construction began without the advance approval the forest service regulation requires and in August 1974, the Forest Service began the ambitious construction of ORV trails in the Hoosier Forest with an opening date of October 14, 1974.

He witnessed these trails being built illegally with $34,000 of public money that had been budgeted for routine maintenance of roads and trails. The Hoosier National Forest budgets had been severely reduced for fiscal years 1974 and 1975. The budget cuts forced a reduction in force in engineering personnel and was barely sufficient for routine maintenance of existing roads and trails systems. When the contractor was told to bill the work to the Forest Service for "routine maintenance", he was outraged that these funds were being diverted and declared this was a "violation of the law".

October 9, 1974, Forest Supervisor Don Girton, District Ranger Frank Haubry, Ferguson and others took a tour to review the newly built ORV trails. Ferguson observed numerous violations of the Forest Service Trail Standards, including but not limited to; reverse curves, trail grades, stumps and logs left in place, damage to soil and watershed lands, damage to wildlife habitat areas and timber production areas. Mr. Girton dismissed Ferguson's concern as "one man's opinion". According to IDS News Staff writer, Gloria Joseph, Girton was later quoted as saying, "If you want to nitpick, you might find some deviation from the ORV standards in the trails".

On October 13, 1974, Ferguson conducted a field trip for environmentalists and reporters to observe the trail damage. They noted damage to the wilderness area, Nebo Ridge, which led to the lawsuit filed against the U.S. Forest Service.

== Lawsuit against US Forest Service ==
On October 19, 1974, Ferguson, and the Indiana Division of the Izaak Walton League of American Endowment, Inc filed a lawsuit against Donald Girton, Supervisor of Wayne-Hoosier National Forest, the State of Indiana and Jay Cravens, the Eastern Region Forester of United States Forest Service, seeking a temporary restraining order and injunction halting the trail use.

The American Motorcycle Association joined the lawsuit on the side of the Forest Service, while The Sassafras (the Indiana Chapter of the National Audubon Society), the National Audubon Society, the Indiana Conservation Council, the National Wildfire Federation Affiliate in Indiana, and the National Wildlife Federation all joined the Ferguson, Izaak Walton side.

Don Girton informed Ferguson that he was being detailed to Milwaukee for three weeks in November 1974 and on March 3, 1975, Ferguson received notice that he was to be permanently transferred to Milwaukee which he declined after the Forest Service denied his spouse's request to also be transferred with him to Milwaukee. John A. Sandor, deputy regional forester at the time said "We had an opening in Milwaukee for somebody of his qualification and we sent him" according to forest service officials sworn statements; however, Girton said Ferguson's actions were the reason for the transfer.

Ferguson was suspended for two weeks without pay and was then notified that he would be removed from office effective February 15, 1976, for participating in a lawsuit in which the government had an interest and for conflict of interest. He was eighteen months away from full retirement. Newspapers and environmental groups rallied behind Ferguson and commended him for outstanding service, loyalty, and devotion to conservation in Indiana.

Ferguson claimed the Privacy Act of 1974 rules were broken when his personal medical history was included in a sworn written statement that Sandor gave to a US government special agent on June 18, 1975. The agent later testified that he had not requested any of Ferguson's medical information from Sandor, and Ferguson and his doctor at Washington University Hospital stated that Sandor neither asked nor received permission to use any part of Ferguson's medical records. Ferguson claimed harassment and unlawful termination and on December 20, 1976, a civil servant hearing on his firing commenced and ended on the same day with Ferguson being allowed to retire with full and retroactive benefits.

The ORV court challenge continued with a trial date set for December 5, 1977, however, a few months before it was to begin the Forest Service reversed their decision and completely terminated the policy of allowing the use of ORVs in the Hoosier National Forest.

Ferguson's case was given to a US Senate subcommittee, chaired by Senator Edward Kennedy, which drafted a freedom-of-information bill providing protection for government employees who disclose information in disagreement with department policies. Reps. Mo Udall and Paul Simon, along with Senator Patrick Leahy introduced bills in the US Congress to create review boards to investigate worker complaints about improper government actions. The Whistleblower Protection Act of 1989 cemented this protection for all government employees.

== Awards and service ==
A. Claude Ferguson Environmental Awards

- National Wildlife Federation, Outstanding and Distinguished Service in the Field of Natural Resource Management; June 1976
- Indiana Conservation Council, Outstanding Service to Conservation in Indiana; June 1976
- Izaak Walton League of America, Conservation Award presented in Baltimore, Maryland; July 17, 1976
- U.S. Environmental Protection Agency Quality Award; August 12, 1976
- Sierra Club; 1976
- Hoosier Environmental Award; Lifetime Environmental Service Award; October, 1990
- John James Audubon Society, Career-Long Demonstration of the Preservation of our Natural Environment; May 1975

Service

- State of Indiana Outdoor Education Research Advisory Committee for the creation of the Indiana University School of Outdoor Education, 1968–1972
- Indiana State Forest Planning Advisory Committee
- Advisory Committee for Conservation and Outdoor Education to the Indiana State Superintendent of Public Education 1968–1972
- Indiana Region 10 Planning Council by Appointment
- Hoosier Trails Council, Boy Scouts of America Advisory Council
- Charter Member of the Conservation-Outdoor Education Association in Indiana
- Past-President of the Indiana Wildlife Federation
- National Interagency Forest Fire Management Team
- National Youth Conservation Interagency Team

== Later years ==
Ferguson was instrumental in establishing the Charles C. Deam Wilderness Area in 1982. Following his death in 2006, his Deam Wilderness papers and maps were donated to the Indiana Forest Alliance and are now housed at the Indiana University Lilly Library. A Celebration of the Deam was held at IU Lilly Library April 20, 2011.

Rosemary O'Leary included Ferguson's story in her book The Ethics of Dissent.

Ferguson performed musical spoon playing. He was featured in the July 2007 issue of the Highlights Magazine "Spoonful of Music" and in 1995 he published a booklet on musical spoons, "You, Too, Can Play the Spoons".

Claude's musical spoon booklet was a Jeopardy! question on March 23, 2001.
