= Shields, Indiana =

- Unincorporated community
- Location within Indiana Location within the United States
- Coordinates: 38°54′57″N 86°00′12″W
- Country: United States
- State: Indiana
- County: Jackson
- Township: Hamilton
- Elevation: 551 ft (168 m)
- ZIP code: 47274
- FIPS code: 18-69444
- GNIS feature ID: 443375

Shields was an unincorporated village in Hamilton Township, Jackson County, Indiana. It is the site of the Shields' Mill Covered Bridge, a National Register of Historic Places-listed property.

== History ==
Shields was laid out in 1866 by L. L. and William H. Shields, and named for them. A post office was established at Shields in 1866, and remained in operation until it was discontinued in 1904.
