= Hickory Ridge Fire Tower =

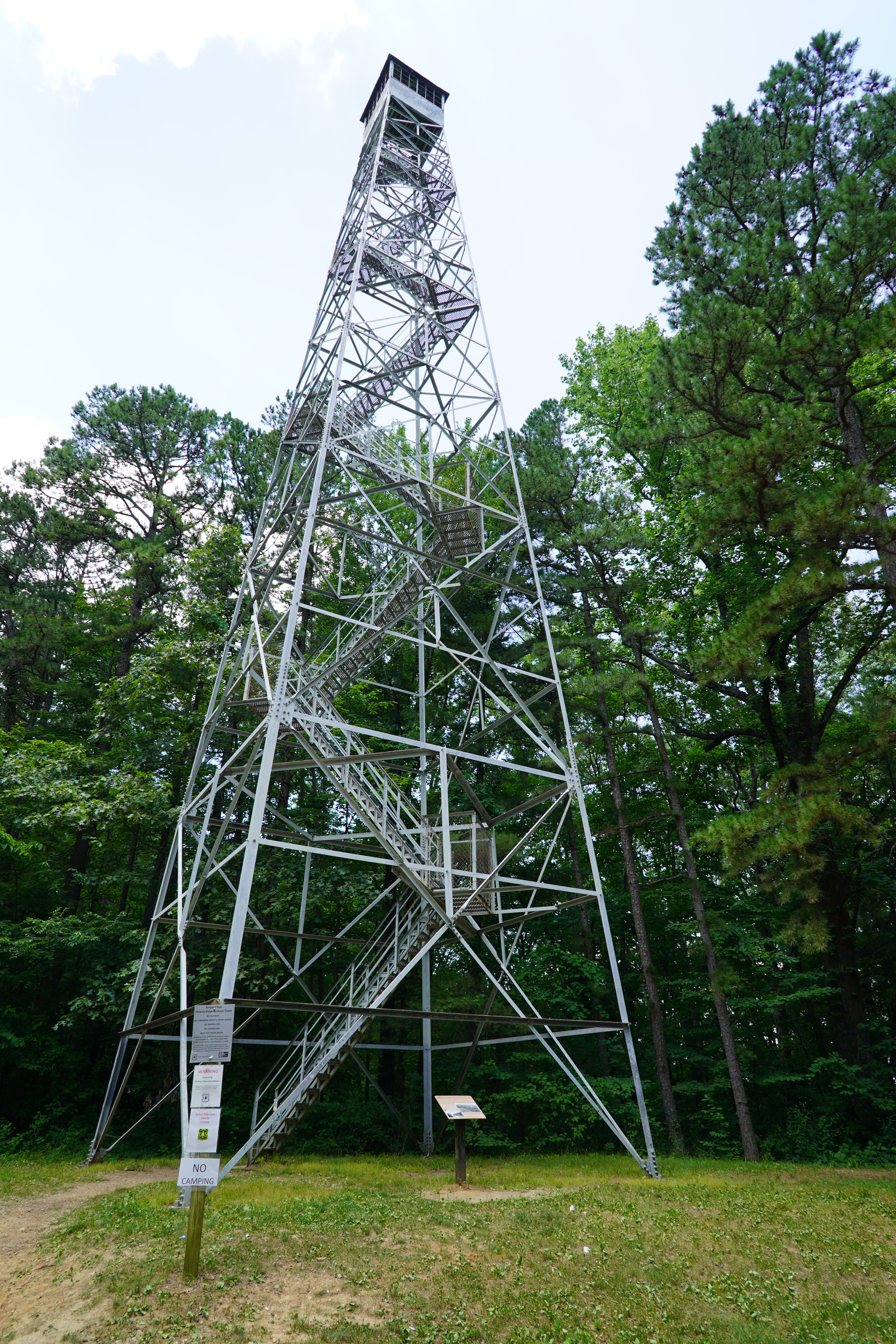
- Hickory Ridge Fire Tower
- Interactive map of the Hickory Ridge Fire Tower area

General information
- Type: Fire lookout tower
- Location: Charles C. Deam Wilderness Area
- Coordinates: 39.034817°N 86.321235°W
- Construction started: 1936
- Completed: 1936

Height
- Height: 110 feet (34 meters)

Technical details
- Structural system: Steel

The Hickory Ridge Fire Tower is a Fire lookout tower located in the Charles C. Deam Wilderness Area. It is an Aermotors type lookout tower.

Construction of the tower began in 1936 under the auspices of the Civilian Conservation Corps. It is constructed of steel with a seven-foot square 'cab' on the top where the lookout was posted with various equipment including an alidade device used to help locate the location of fire outbreaks. As constructed, the tower included 123 wooden steps to provide access to the cab Following a refurbishment of the tower, the wooden steps were replaced. Today, there are 133 steel steps. Originally there was a cabin or guard station, a latrine, and a garage built on the site. All but the tower have now been removed.

The tower was staffed during periods of high fire danger for approximately 40 years. During such times, a small team of fire fighters was stationed at the base of the tower to respond to fire reports as needed. Some peak times saw as many as four to five fires per day. One of these fires, one of the largest on record for the area, came within half a mile (800 meters) of the tower before it was stopped. The tower never endured a fire, though it has been struck by lightning.

Manning of the tower ceased in the late 1970s as the need for the tower had been replaced by other technologies. The tower was one of eight located in the Hoosier National Forest, but is now the only tower remaining. It was added to the National Historic Lookout Register in October 1990, the first such tower in Indiana to be listed.

The tower remains open to the public throughout the year as an observation tower.

== Gallery ==
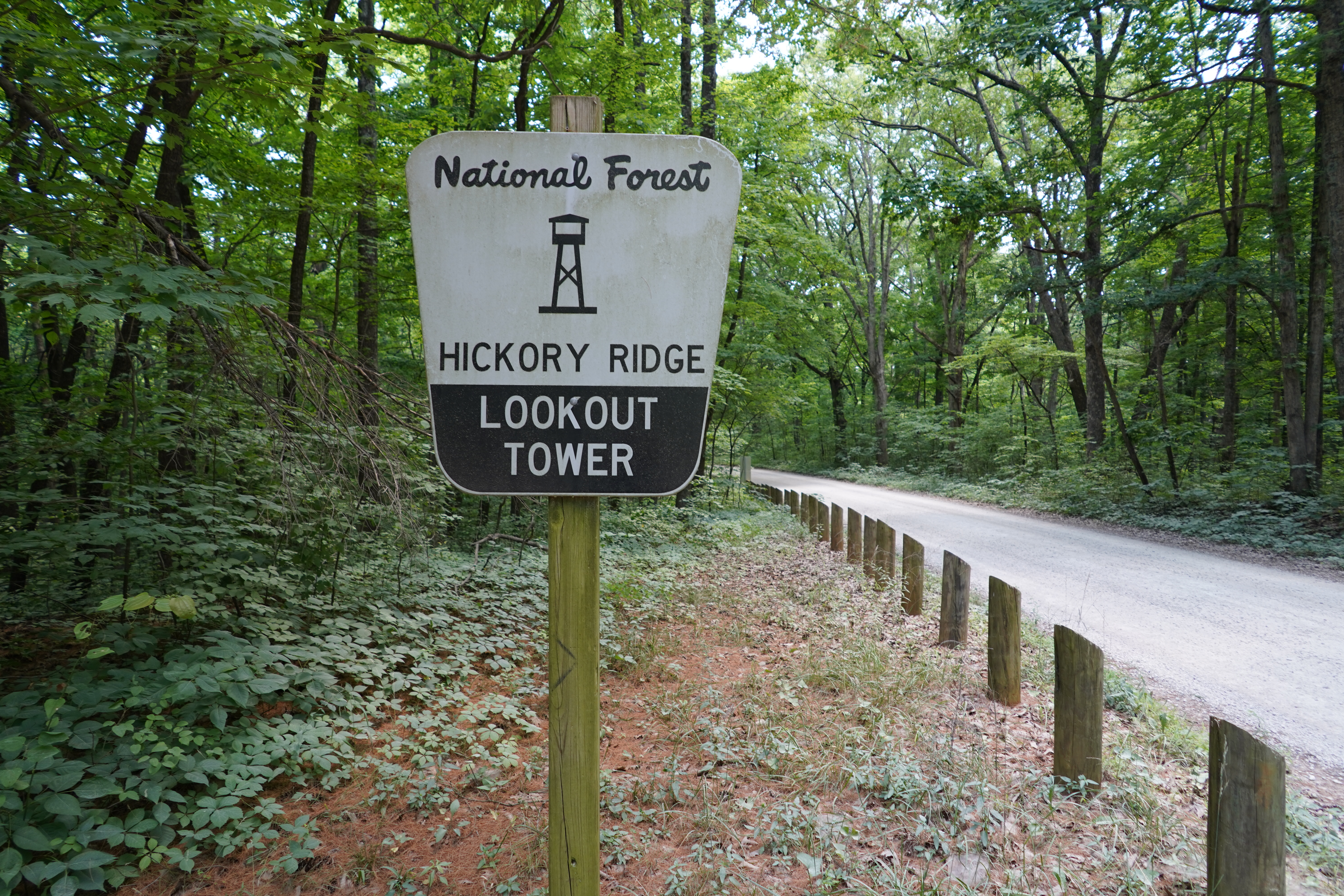
Hickory Ridge Lookout Tower Sign.

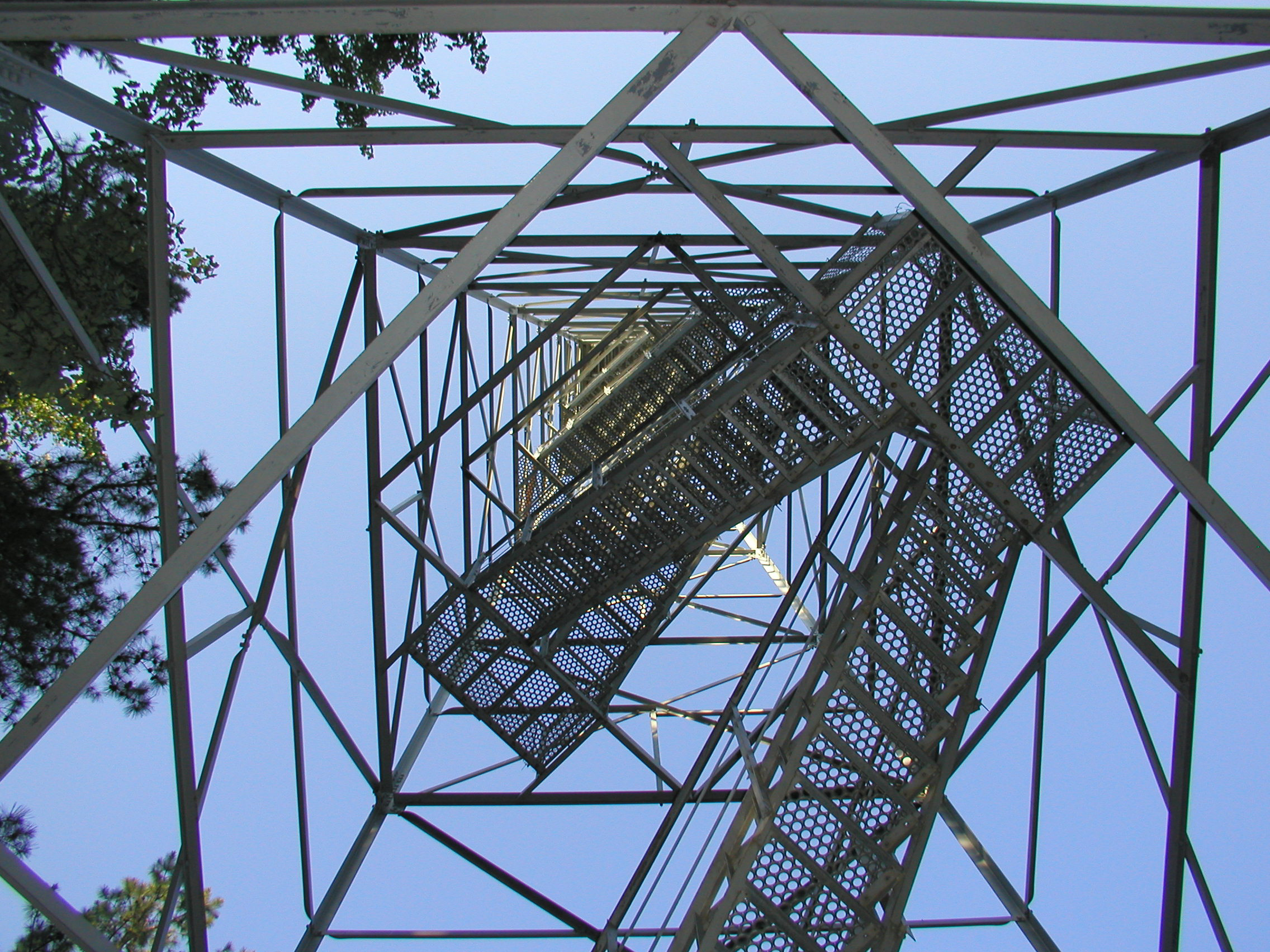
View looking up from near the middle of the base of the tower.

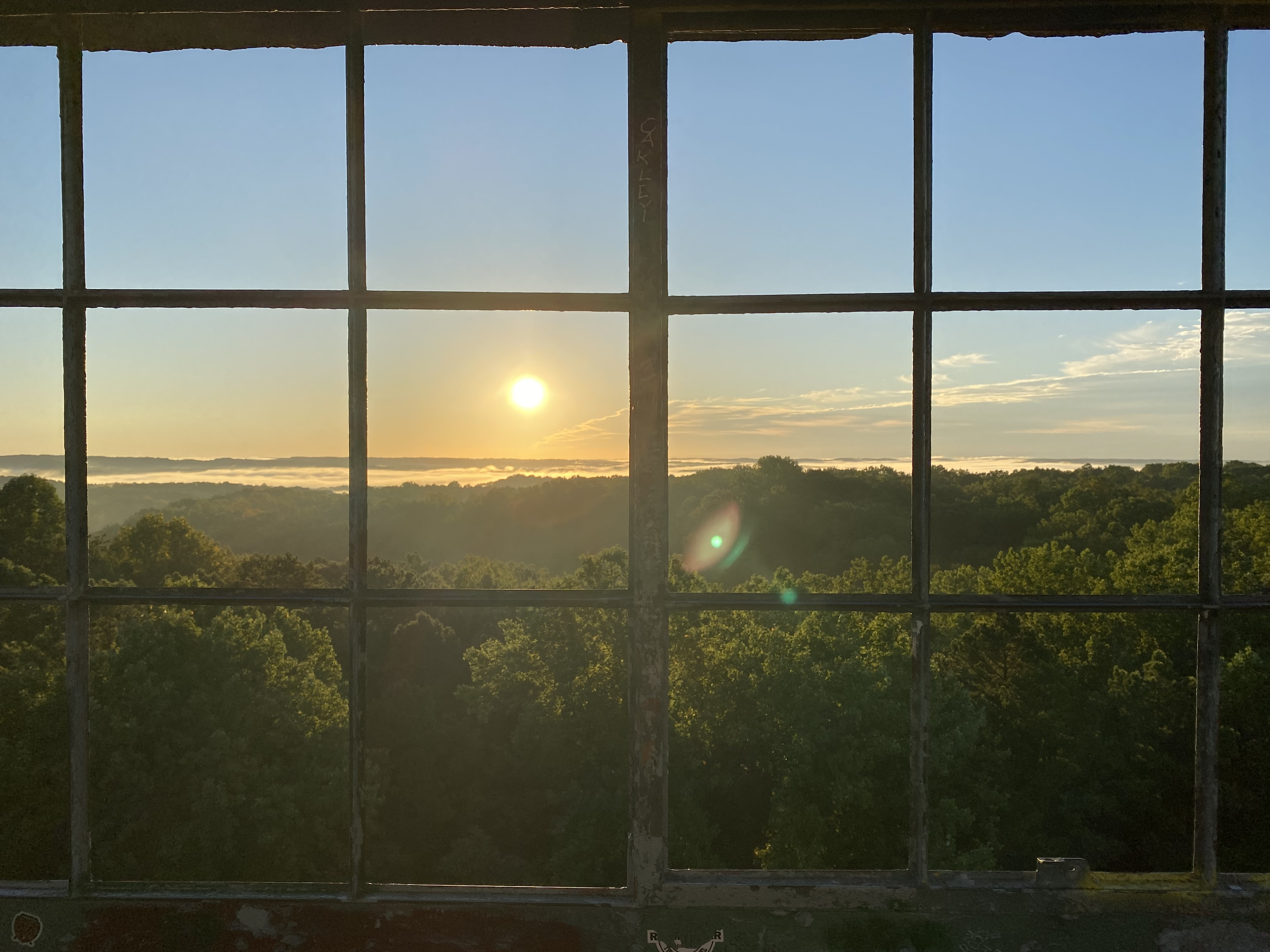
View looking East from the tower.

== See also ==
- Union Lookout, a fire tower in Illinois' Shawnee National Forest
