= Hamilton Township, Jackson County, Indiana =

Hamilton Township
- Township
- Location in Jackson County
- Coordinates: 38°58′46″N 86°00′06″W
- Country: United States
- State: Indiana
- County: Jackson

Government
  - Type: Indiana township

Area
  - Total: 63.34 sq mi (164.0 km^{2})
  - Land: 62.58 sq mi (162.1 km^{2})
  - Water: 0.76 sq mi (2.0 km^{2}) 1.20%
- Elevation: 561 ft (171 m)

Population (2020)
  - Total: 1,558
  - Density: 24.90/sq mi (9.612/km^{2})
- GNIS feature ID: 0453365

Hamilton Township is one of twelve townships in Jackson County, Indiana, United States. As of the 2020 census, its population was 1,558 and it contained 669 housing units. It was named for James Hamilton, an early local politician.

Historical population
Census	Pop.	Note	%±
1890	1,858		—
1900	2,031		9.3%
1910	1,714		−15.6%
1920	1,420		−17.2%
1930	1,334		−6.1%
1940	1,443		8.2%
1950	1,415		−1.9%
1960	1,444		2.0%
1970	1,415		−2.0%
1980	1,509		6.6%
1990	1,680		11.3%
2000	1,615		−3.9%
2010	1,660		2.8%
2020	1,558		−6.1%
Source: US Decennial Census

== History ==
Bell Ford Post Patented Diagonal "Combination Bridge", Beatty-Trimpe Farm, and Shields' Mill Covered Bridge are listed on the National Register of Historic Places.

== Geography ==
According to the 2010 census, the township has a total area of 63.34 square miles (164.0 km^{2}), of which 62.58 square miles (162.1 km^{2}) (or 98.80%) is land and 0.76 square miles (2.0 km^{2}) (or 1.20%) is water. Lakes in this township include Docs Lake. The streams of Buck Branch, Cooley Creek, East Fork White Creek and Indian Creek run through this township.

=== Unincorporated towns ===
- Acme
- Bobtown
- Cortland
- Shields
- Surprise

=== Adjacent townships ===
- Jackson Township, Bartholomew County (north)
- Wayne Township, Bartholomew County (northeast)
- Redding Township (east)
- Jackson Township (east-southeast)
- Brownstown Township (southwest)
- Pershing Township (west)

=== Cemeteries ===
The township contains three cemeteries: Cortland, Robinson and Weddell. There is also an old abandoned cemetery known as Brown Cemetery.

=== Major highways ===
- Indiana State Road 258
