= Pershing Township, Jackson County, Indiana =

Pershing Township
- Township
- Location in Jackson County
- Coordinates: 39°00′01″N 86°07′30″W
- Country: United States
- State: Indiana
- County: Jackson

Government
  - Type: Indiana township

Area
  - Total: 30.86 sq mi (79.9 km^{2})
  - Land: 30.66 sq mi (79.4 km^{2})
  - Water: 0.2 sq mi (0.52 km^{2}) 0.65%
- Elevation: 738 ft (225 m)

Population (2020)
  - Total: 1,354
  - Density: 44.16/sq mi (17.05/km^{2})
- GNIS feature ID: 0453728

Pershing Township is one of twelve townships in Jackson County, Indiana, United States. As of the 2020 census, its population was 1,354 and it contained 600 housing units.

Historical population
Census	Pop.	Note	%±
1920	947		—
1930	956		1.0%
1940	937		−2.0%
1950	1,018		8.6%
1960	1,114		9.4%
1970	1,173		5.3%
1980	1,296		10.5%
1990	1,380		6.5%
2000	1,386		0.4%
2010	1,394		0.6%
2020	1,354		−2.9%
Source: US Decennial Census

== History ==
The Frank Wheeler Hotel was listed on the National Register of Historic Places in 1991.

== Geography ==
According to the 2010 census, the township has a total area of 30.86 square miles (79.9 km^{2}), of which 30.66 square miles (79.4 km^{2}) (or 99.35%) is land and 0.2 square miles (0.52 km^{2}) (or 0.65%) is water. Lakes in this township include Beck Pond, Buckskin Pond, Fox Pond and Scholl Pond. The streams of Cross Branch and Runt Run run through this township.

=== Unincorporated towns ===
- Freetown
- Spraytown

=== Extinct towns ===
- Bald Knobs

=== Adjacent townships ===
- Jackson Township, Bartholomew County (northeast)
- Hamilton Township (east)
- Brownstown Township (southeast)
- Owen Township (southwest)
- Salt Creek Township (west)
- Van Buren Township, Brown County (northwest)

=== Cemeteries ===
The township contains three cemeteries: Lucas, Spraytown and Waggoner.

=== Major highways ===
- Indiana State Road 58
- Indiana State Road 135
- Indiana State Road 258
