= Clear Springs =

Clear Springs or Clear Spring may refer to:

- Clear Spring, Indiana, an unincorporated community
- Clear Springs, Kentucky, an unincorporated community
- Clear Spring, Maryland, a town
- Clear Springs, Missouri, an unincorporated community
- Clear Springs, Texas, an unincorporated community
