= Buzzard Roost Trail =

Hiking trail in Southern Indiana

Coordinates: 38.120445°N 86.465764°W

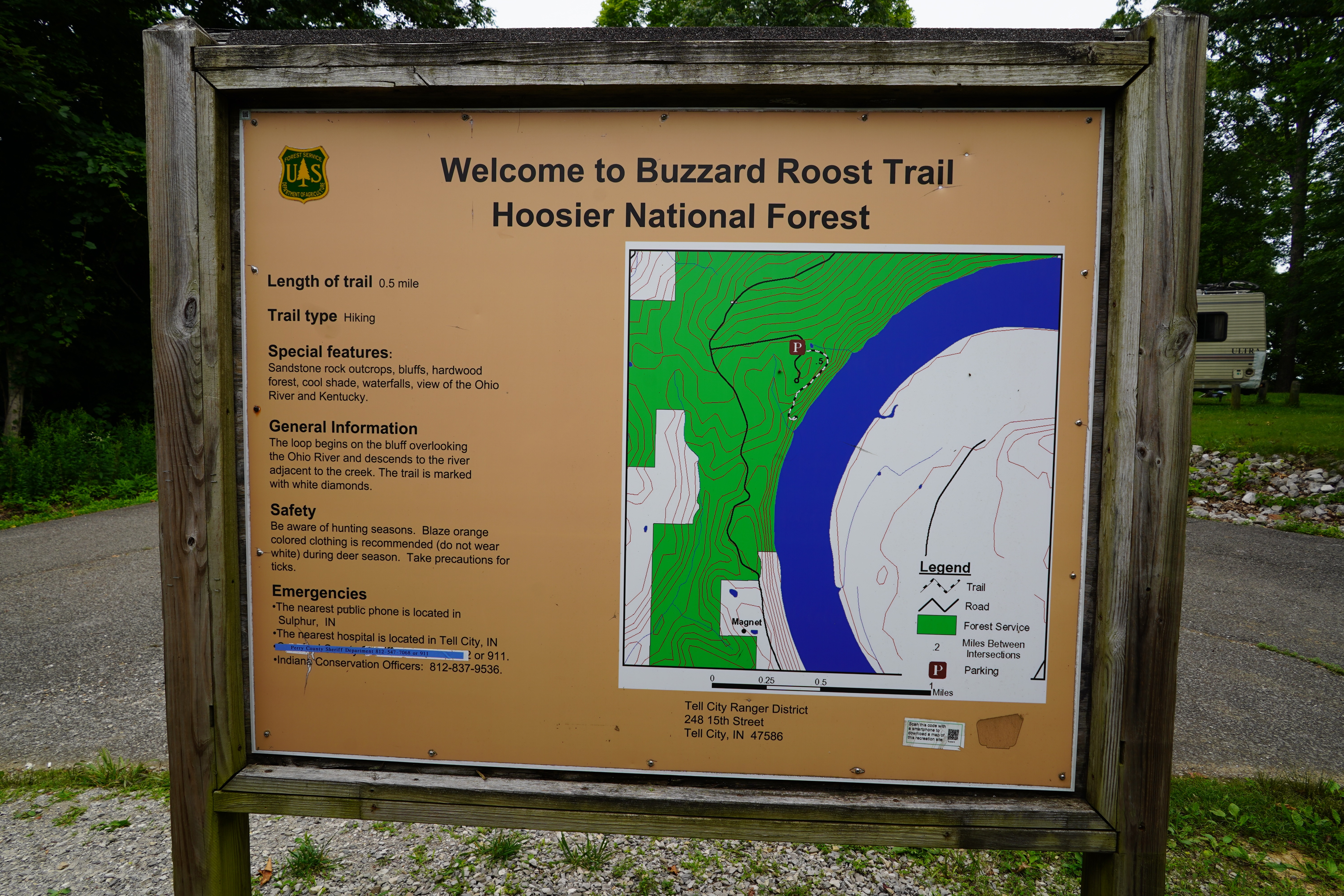
- Buzzard Roost Trail Sign
- Length: 0.8 mi (1.3 km)
- Location: Union Township, Perry County, Indiana, United States
- Designation: Hoosier National Forest trail
- Use: Hiking
- Difficulty: Moderate to Strenuous
- Sights: Ohio River, stream and waterfall
- Hazards: Falling, Poison Ivy

The Buzzard Roost Trail is a hiking trail in Southern Indiana, north of the community of Magnet in Perry County. It is part of the Hoosier National Forest and is maintained by the USDA Forest Service.

The trail begins on a bluff overlooking the Ohio River. From there a steep trail ascends through a hardwood forest to a rocky stream that runs into the river with waterfalls and large sandstone outcrops. The trail is approximately 0.8 miles (1.3 km) long. The overlook area has primitive camping and picnic facilities. it has multiple trails with many small caves.

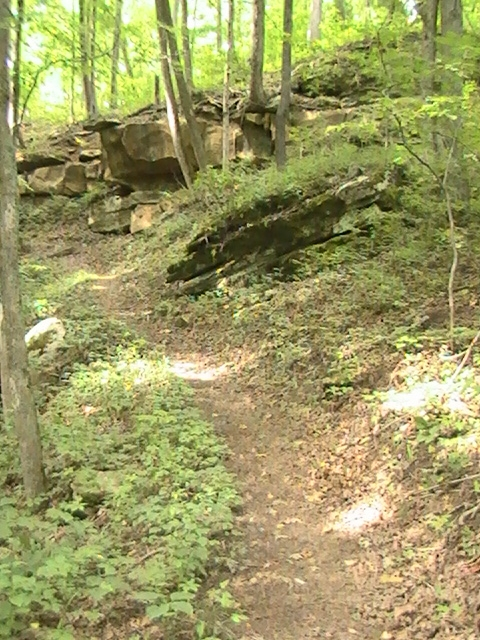
Hardwood forest

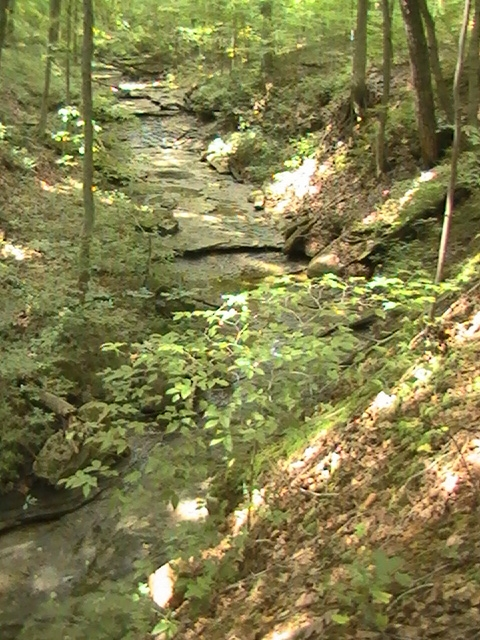
A rocky stream

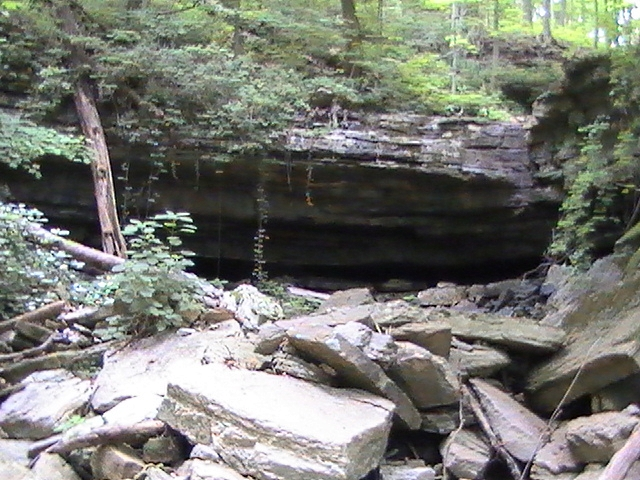
The waterfall during dry season
