= Union Lookout =

- U.S. National Register of Historic Places
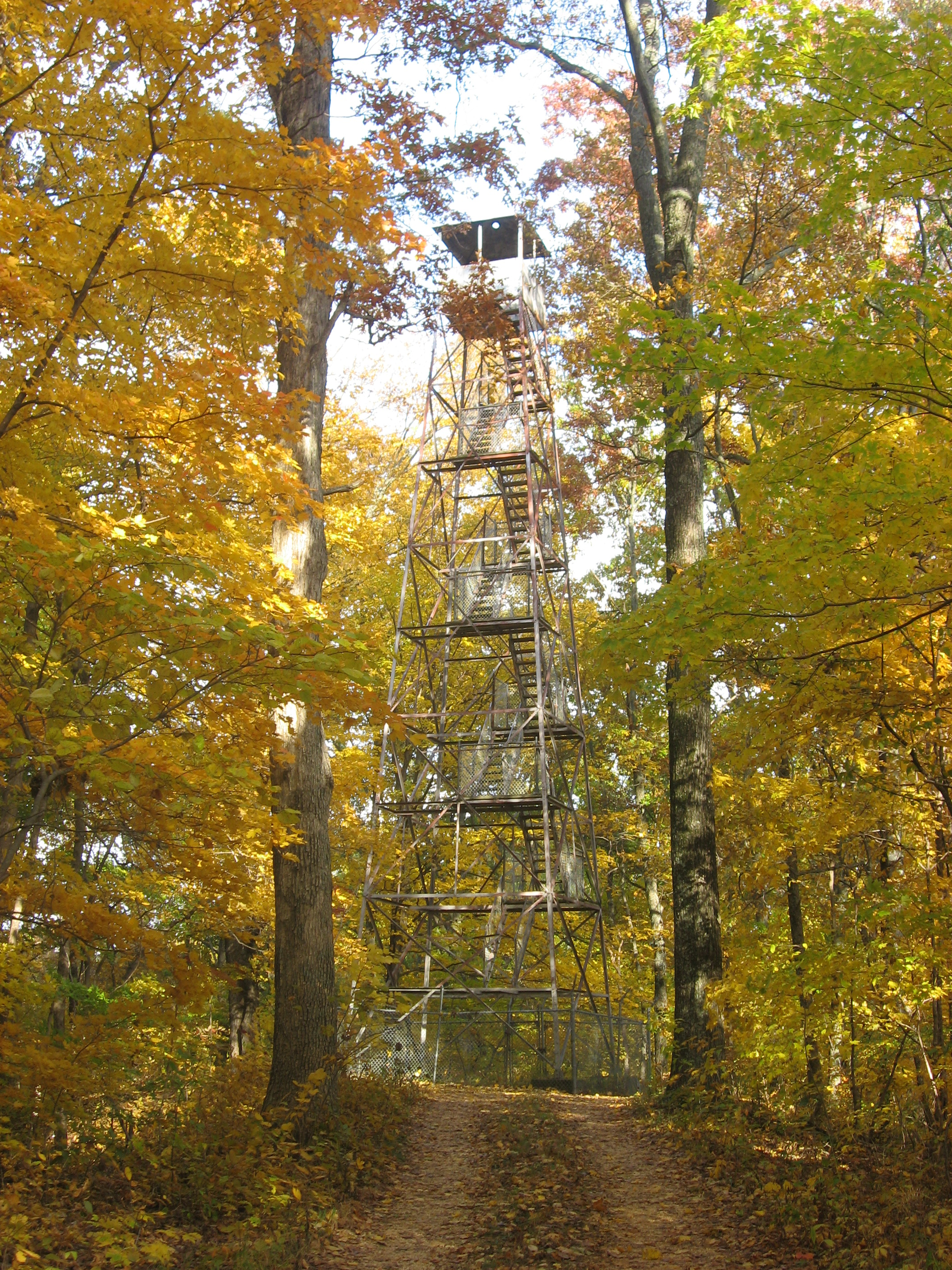
- View from the west in autumn

- Location within Illinois Location within the United States
- Nearest city: Jonesboro, Illinois
- Coordinates: 37°28′47.5″N 89°21′28″W
- Area: 0.3 acres (0.12 ha)
- Built: 1934
- Architect: Conrad Fischer
- Architectural style: Steel X-brace tower
- NRHP reference No.: 02001759
- Added to NRHP: February 5, 2003

Union Lookout is a lookout tower located within Trail of Tears State Forest in Union County, Illinois, United States. The Civilian Conservation Corps built the tower circa 1934 as part of a network of fire lookout towers in Shawnee National Forest; the fire towers were one of many CCC conservation projects in the forest, which also included planting trees, constructing bridges and trails, and preventing erosion. The tower was used through the 1960s, by which time airplanes had largely replaced towers as a means of detecting fires; it is now the only remaining lookout tower in the forest. On February 5, 2003, Union Lookout was added to the National Register of Historic Places.

== See also ==
- Hickory Ridge Fire Tower in Indiana's Hoosier National Forest
