= Owen Township, Jackson County, Indiana =

Owen Township
- Township
- Location in Jackson County
- Coordinates: 38°54′37″N 86°12′02″W
- Country: United States
- State: Indiana
- County: Jackson

Government
  - Type: Indiana township

Area
  - Total: 54.72 sq mi (141.7 km^{2})
  - Land: 54.47 sq mi (141.1 km^{2})
  - Water: 0.24 sq mi (0.62 km^{2}) 0.44%
- Elevation: 863 ft (263 m)

Population (2020)
  - Total: 1,588
  - Density: 29.15/sq mi (11.26/km^{2})
- GNIS feature ID: 0453702

Owen Township is one of twelve townships in Jackson County, Indiana, United States. As of the 2020 census, its population was 1,588 and it contained 667 housing units. It was named for the local Owen family of pioneer settlers.

Historical population
Census	Pop.	Note	%±
1890	1,722		—
1900	2,031		17.9%
1910	1,795		−11.6%
1920	1,447		−19.4%
1930	1,338		−7.5%
1940	1,535		14.7%
1950	1,467		−4.4%
1960	1,456		−0.7%
1970	1,329		−8.7%
1980	1,380		3.8%
1990	1,525		10.5%
2000	1,625		6.6%
2010	1,572		−3.3%
2020	1,588		1.0%
Source: US Decennial Census

== Geography ==
According to the 2010 census, the township has a total area of 54.72 square miles (141.7 km^{2}), of which 54.47 square miles (141.1 km^{2}) (or 99.54%) is land and 0.24 square miles (0.62 km^{2}) (or 0.44%) is water. The streams of Bee Creek, Clear Spring Creek and Little Salt Creek run through this township.

=== Unincorporated towns ===
- Clear Spring
- Kurtz
- Norman

=== Extinct towns ===
- Pleasantville

=== Adjacent townships ===
- Salt Creek Township (north)
- Pershing Township (northeast)
- Brownstown Township (east)
- Carr Township (south)
- Guthrie Township, Lawrence County (southwest)
- Pleasant Run Township, Lawrence County (west)

=== Cemeteries ===
The township contains three cemeteries: Bagwell, Bower, and Scott-Wray.

=== Major highways ===
- U.S. Route 50
- State Road 135
- State Road 235
