= Freetown, Indiana =

Census-designated place in Indiana, US

- Census-designated place
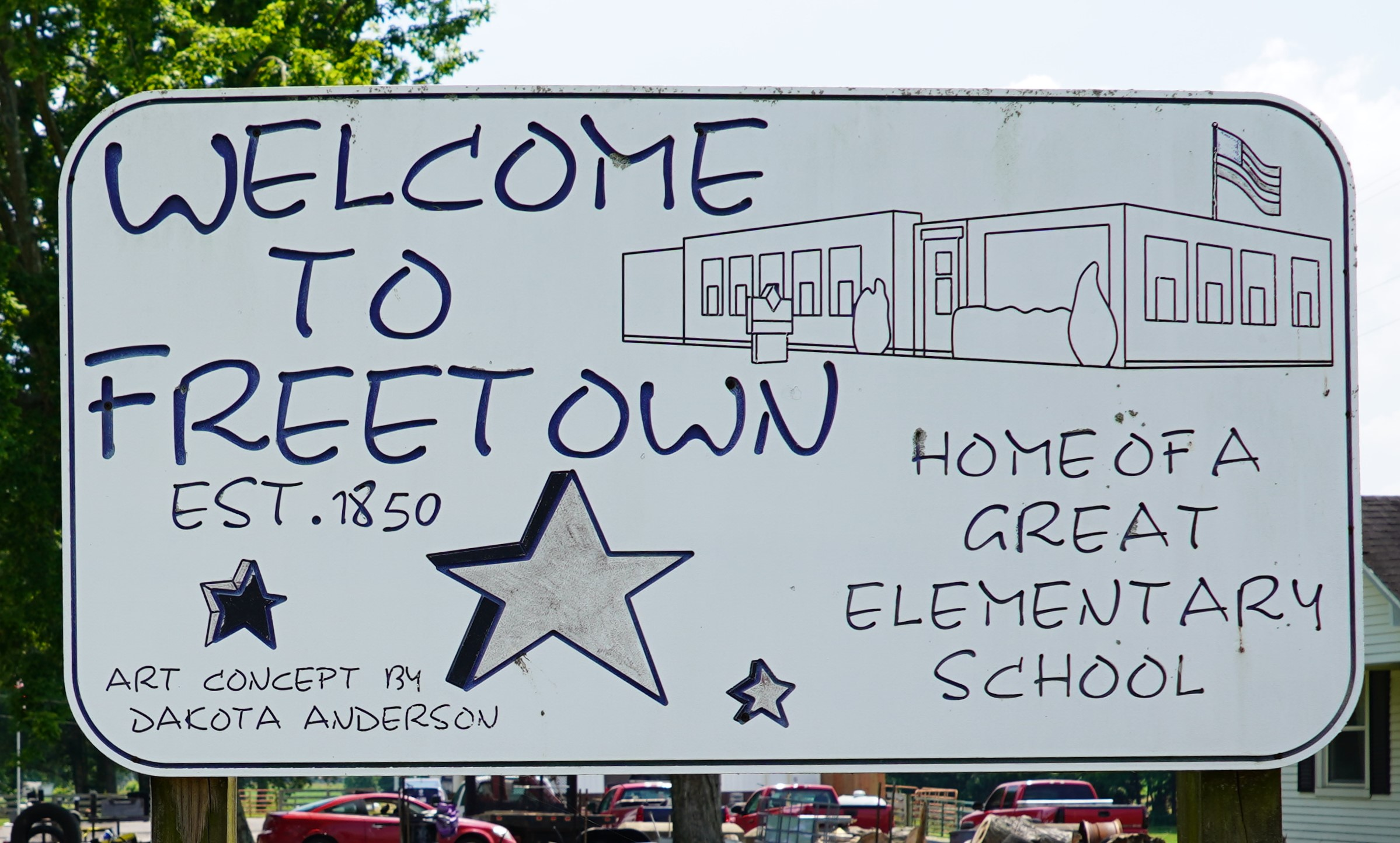
- Freetown, Indiana

- Location of Freetown in Jackson County, Indiana

- Location within Indiana Location within the United States
- Coordinates: 38°58′41″N 86°07′26″W
- Country: United States
- State: Indiana
- County: Jackson
- Township: Pershing

Area
  - Total: 0.69 sq mi (1.80 km^{2})
  - Land: 0.69 sq mi (1.79 km^{2})
  - Water: 0 sq mi (0.00 km^{2})
- Elevation: 659 ft (201 m)

Population (2020)
  - Total: 369
  - Density: 532.6/sq mi (205.65/km^{2})
- ZIP code: 47235
- FIPS code: 18-25864
- GNIS feature ID: 2629879

Freetown is an unincorporated community and census-designated place in Pershing Township, Jackson County, Indiana, United States. As of the 2020 census, Freetown had a population of 369.

== History ==
Freetown was platted in 1850. A post office was established at Freetown in 1850.

The Frank Wheeler Hotel was listed on the National Register of Historic Places in 1991.

== Geography ==
Freetown is located in northwestern Jackson County and is bordered to the west by Hoosier National Forest. Indiana State Road 135 passes through the west side of the community, leading north 18 miles (29 km) to Gnaw Bone and south 11 miles (18 km) to Brownstown, the Jackson county seat. State Road 58 passes through the west and north sides of the community, leading northeast 23 miles (37 km) to Columbus and southwest 27 miles (43 km) to Bedford.

According to the U.S. Census Bureau, the Freetown CDP has a total area of 0.73 square miles (1.88 km^{2}), of which 1.9 acres (7,820 m^{2}), or 0.42%, are water.

== Demographics ==
Historical population
Census	Pop.	Note	%±
2020	369		—
U.S. Decennial Census
