= USS Argosy =

Gunboat of the United States Navy

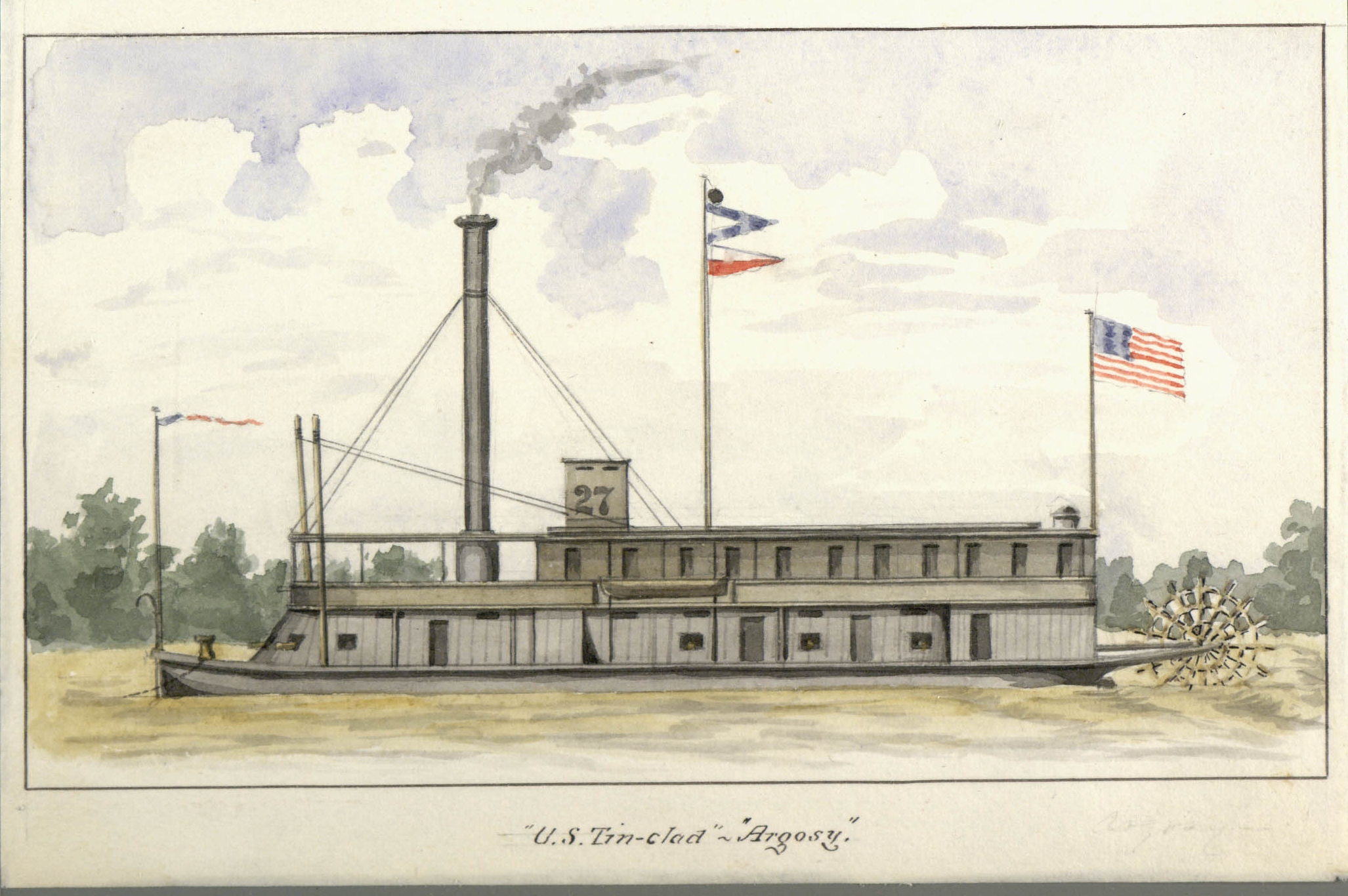
- USS Argosy (Number 27) tinclad operating on Western rivers

History

United States
- Name: USS Argosy
- Laid down: 1862
- Launched: 1863
- Acquired: 24 March 1863
- Commissioned: 29 March 1863
- Decommissioned: 11 August 1865
- Stricken: 1865 (est.)
- Fate: Sold, 17 August 1865

General characteristics
- Displacement: 219 tons
- Length: 156 ft 4 in (47.65 m)
- Beam: 33 ft (10 m)
- Draft: 4 ft 6 in (1.37 m)
- Depth of hold: 4 ft 8 in (1.42 m)
- Propulsion: Steam engine; Stern wheel-propelled
- Speed: 5 mph (upstream)
- Complement: not known
- Armament: 2 × 12-pounder rifles; 6 × 24-pounder smoothbores

USS Argosy was a steamer acquired by the Union Navy during the American Civil War. She was used by the Union Navy as a supply ship and gunboat in support of the Union Navy blockade of Confederate waterways.

== Argosy, a stern wheeler, constructed at Monongahela ==
On 24 March 1863, the Union Navy purchased Argosy - a stern-wheel river steamer built in late 1862 and early 1863 at Monongahela, Pennsylvania - and, five days later, placed her in commission.

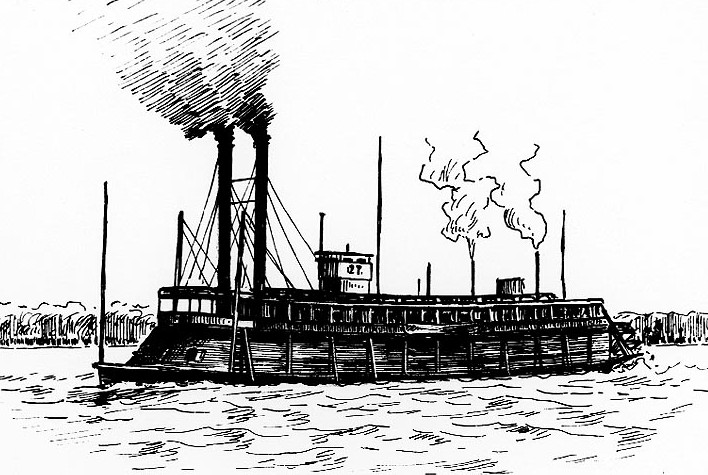
Litograph of Samuel War Stanton of USS Argosy.

== Civil War service ==
=== Assigned as a supply ship and gunboat on Southern rivers ===
On 3 April, she got underway up the Ohio River to join a group of gunboats – commanded by Lt. Comdr. Le Roy Fitch – operating on that river and on its tributaries, the Tennessee River and the Cumberland River. Her duties consisted of patrolling these waters to safeguard their use as lines of communication and supply supporting Union troops then pushing south through the state of Tennessee and, later in the war, into Georgia. She also labored to deny the use of these waters to Southern forces.

=== Leaving behind a path of destruction ===
For example, on 5 May, she joined four other gunboats in an expedition up the Tennessee River. As they ascended that river, they destroyed "... every kind of boat that could serve the rebels..." On the 11th, she, Covington, and Silver Cloud left Queen City and Champion, the division flagship, at Cerro Gordo and continued on upriver to Eastport, Mississippi, ". . . the highest navigable point at that stage of water."

=== Providing reserve support for General Rosecrans ===
Their presence far up the Tennessee River provided General William Rosecrans with a possible haven of naval gunfire support to which his troops could retire in the event of a serious setback in an engagement with Confederate forces which, Union leaders then felt, were massing for a major offensive.

For a number of reasons – including the assassination of General Earl Van Dorn on 7 May – the Southern push did not materialize, but Argosy's operations on this occasion were typical of her service throughout the remaining two years of the Civil War.

By this time, the South's naval forces had been swept from the Mississippi River and its branches; and Vicksburg, Mississippi, and Port Hudson, Louisiana, the last Confederate riverside forts blocking Northern shipping, were about to fall. Thus, other than routine patrol and escort duty, little work was left for the gunboat.

=== Argosy lands a successful raiding party ===
One exception occurred on 6 September 1863 when a party from Argosy landed at Bruinsburg, Mississippi, to destroy a ferryboat. The Northern sailors also found a small group of horsemen with a large quantity of ordnance supplies. Upon seeing the Union men, the Southerners mounted and rode away, abandoning a "... wagonload consisting of 250,000 waterproof percussion caps, 1 box containing 5,000 friction pruners .." and a few other items.

=== Confederate ram Webb attempts an escape down the river ===
The end of the war found Argosy serving in the 1st District of the Mississippi Squadron which was responsible for the river between New Orleans, Louisiana, and Donaldsonville, Louisiana. In the predawn darkness of 24 April, the Confederate steam ram Webb – which had just emerged from the mouth of the Red River – dashed downstream past Argosy in an attempt to escape to sea. False rumors – that President Jefferson Davis and other high officials of the collapsed Confederacy were on board the Southern steamer – heightened interest in her race toward freedom. Her success depended upon the steamer's slipping by Union warships without being identified. When her true nature was discovered and a warning of her coming had been wired downriver, her commanding officer, Lt. Charles W. Read, CSN, realized that all chance of safely reaching the Gulf of Mexico had disappeared.

As a result, he ran Webb on a riverbank, set her afire, ordered his crew to scatter, and attempted to slip away ashore.

== Post-war decommissioning, sale and subsequent maritime career ==
Argosy continued to serve the Mississippi Squadron as it demobilized during the months following the end of the fighting. One of its last ships, the stern-wheeler, was finally decommissioned at Mound City, Illinois, on 11 August 1865. She was sold at public auction there on 17 August 1865 to Mr. V. P. Schenck, and was redocumented under her original name on 11 October 1865. Argosy operated commercially on the Mississippi River and its tributaries until she was destroyed by fire at Cincinnati, Ohio, on 7 March 1872.
