= Charles C. Deam Wilderness =

United States National Forest in Indiana

- IUCN category Ib (wilderness area)
- Location within the United States
- Location: Monroe / Brown / Jackson / Lawrence counties, Indiana, USA
- Nearest city: Bloomington, Indiana
- Coordinates: 39°02′17″N 86°21′17″W
- Area: 12,935 acres (52 km^{2})
- Established: 1982
- Governing body: U.S. Forest Service

The Charles C. Deam Wilderness is located close to the city of Heltonville and Bloomington, Indiana. Lake Monroe, Indiana's largest reservoir, forms the northern boundary. It was established as wilderness in 1982 and is managed by the Hoosier National Forest. It covers 12,472 acres (19.49 mi^{2} or 50.47 km^{2}). It was named in honor of Indiana's first State Forester Charles C. Deam.

== Location and History ==
The area is a fine example of Karst topography, with its flat-topped ridges, geode-laden streambeds, and occasional caves. It lies near Mount Carmel Fault.

Many colorful wildflowers and plants bloom during the spring. These include twin leaf, bloodroot, dutchman's breeches, hyacinth, phacelia, wood poppy, spring beauty and blue phlox. Bird species, like the Acadian flycatcher, red-shouldered hawk, sharp-shinned hawk, scarlet tanager, pileated woodpecker, several warbler species and red-eyed vireo, thrive. Venomous snakes also persist in small numbers, including the timber rattlesnake and copperhead. Fox squirrel, white-tailed deer, turkey and raccoon are plentiful, attracting many hunters every fall. Hikers, backpackers, and horseback riders are also drawn to the wilderness and its 39 miles of trails.

Unlike the virgin forest found in many other wilderness areas, the Deam Wilderness Area was settled beginning in 1826. The wilderness area is separated by Tower Ridge Road and the northern section is larger than the southern. Most of the trails follow old roadbeds, and exploration off the main trails will bring visitors past other shadows of the past, including house foundations, domestic plants, old fences, and the occasional cemetery (five cemeteries exist within the wilderness boundary). The narrow, rocky ridges made for marginally productive farmland, but the inhabitants were able to scrape by until the Great Depression.

As the economy forced them out, the U.S. Forest Service acquired their property and, with the help of the Civilian Conservation Corps, began rehabilitating the area and managing it for recreation. "Improvements" included constructing ponds, replanting trees, and building the Hickory Ridge Fire Tower that still stands, open to the public, at the Hickory Ridge Trailhead. Since its designation as a wilderness area under Ronald Reagan in 1982, the only artificial improvements have come in the form of trail maintenance.

Claude Ferguson, former Supervisor of the Hoosier National Forest, was instrumental in establishing the Charles C. Deam Wilderness Area. Following his death in 2006, his Deam Wilderness papers and maps were donated to the Indiana Forest Alliance and are now housed at the Indiana University Lilly Library. A Celebration of the Deam was held at IU Lilly Library April 20, 2011.

== Charles C. Deam Wilderness Trail System ==
Trail	Location	Uses	Length (miles)
Hays Trail	Trailhead: 39.04460, -86.40657	Hiking, horse riding	4.7
Grubb Ridge Trail	Trailhead: 39.032701, -86.340826	Hiking, horse riding	12.1
Peninsula Trail		Hiking, horse riding	2.6
Axsom Trail		Hiking, horse riding	2.6
Cope Hollow Trail		Hiking, horse riding	4.7
Sycamore Trail		Hiking	4.7
Terrill Ridge Trail		Hiking, horse riding	1.8

Source: "Charles C. Deam Wilderness" (PDF). United States Forest Service. Archived from the original (PDF) on March 27, 2014.

== Gallery ==
Sunrise at Terrel Pond

== See also ==
- List of U.S. Wilderness Areas
- Wilderness Act
