= Kurtz, Indiana =

- Unincorporated community
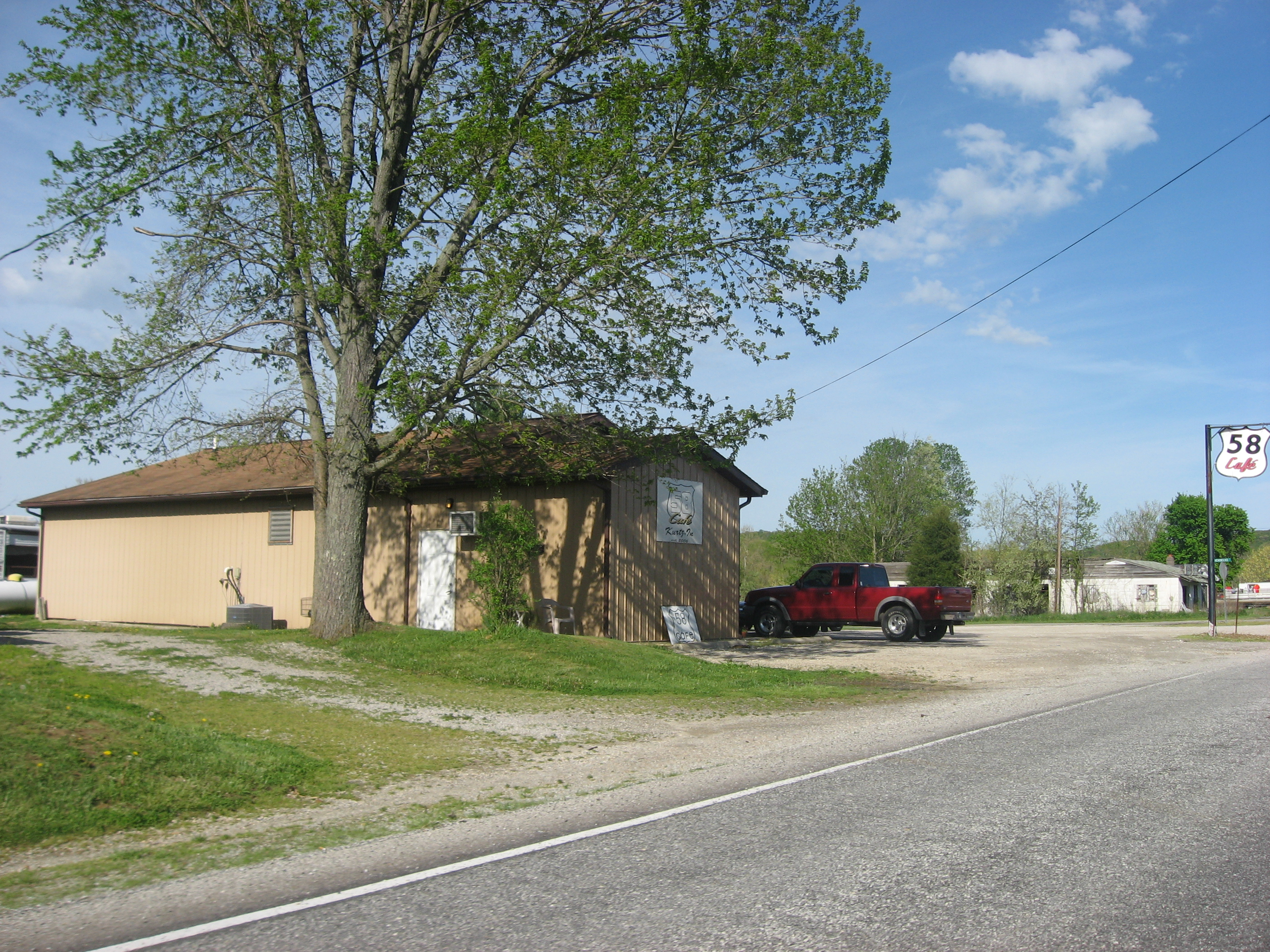
- Scene along Fourth Street

- Location within Indiana Location within the United States
- Coordinates: 38°57′38″N 86°12′12″W
- Country: United States
- State: Indiana
- County: Jackson
- Township: Owen
- Elevation: 600 ft (180 m)
- ZIP code: 47264
- FIPS code: 18-40590
- GNIS feature ID: 451126

Kurtz is an unincorporated community in Owen Township, Jackson County, Indiana.

== History ==
Kurtz is an unincorporated community in Jackson County, Indiana. The name of Kurtz was taken from Colonel Harry Kurtz, an attorney for the Evansville & Richmond Railroad who was instrumental in steering the rail lines through Owen and Salt Creek Townships.
