= Spraytown, Indiana =

- Unincorporated community
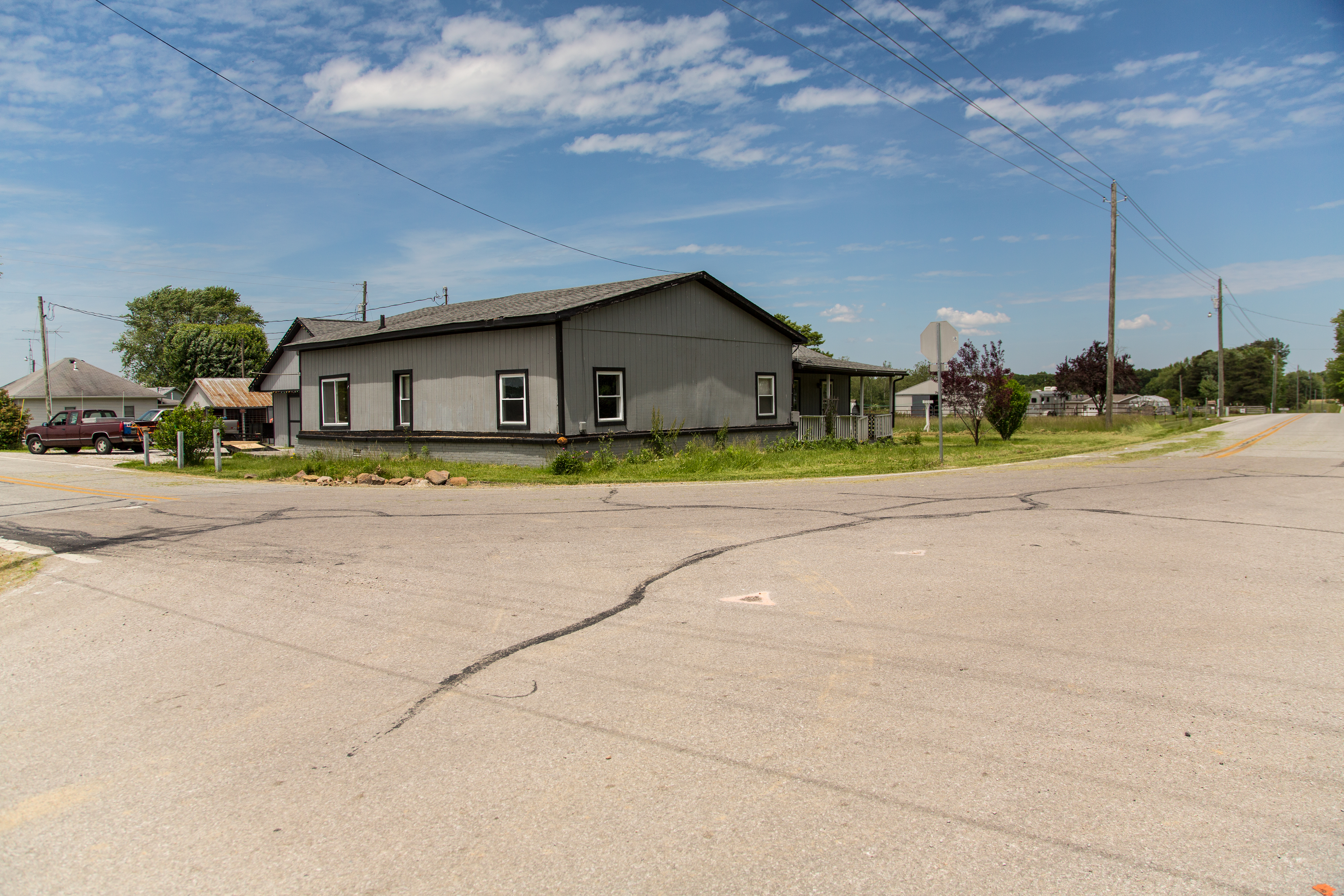

- Location within Indiana Location within the United States
- Coordinates: 39°00′51″N 86°04′48″W
- Country: United States
- State: Indiana
- County: Jackson
- Township: Pershing
- Elevation: 768 ft (234 m)
- ZIP code: 47274
- FIPS code: 18-72062
- GNIS feature ID: 451494

Spraytown is an unincorporated community in Pershing Township, Jackson County, Indiana, United States.

== History ==
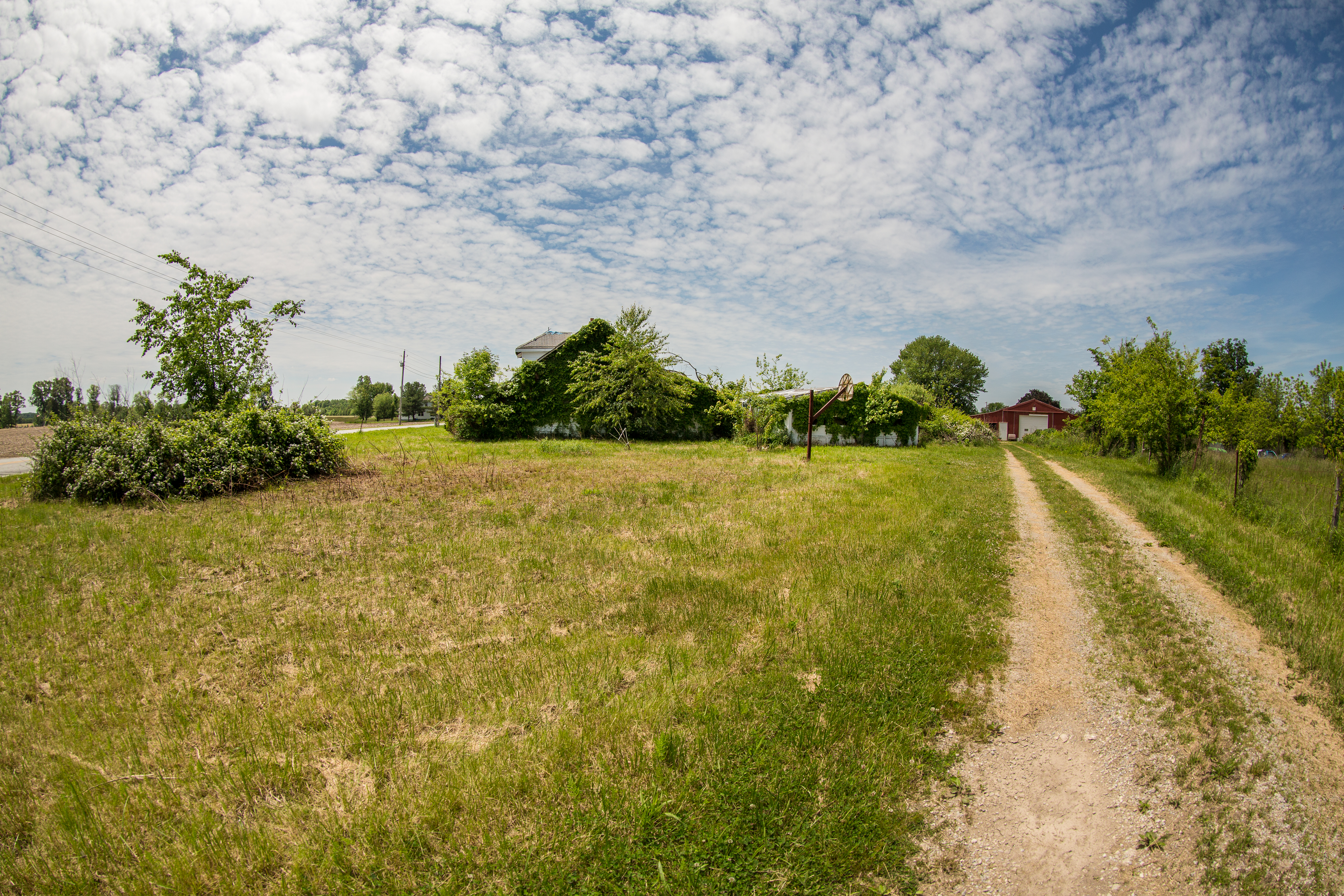
Spraytown, Indiana

Spraytown was named for a local merchant named Spray. The post office at Spraytown closed in 1909.
