= Beatty–Trimpe Farm =

- U.S. National Register of Historic Places
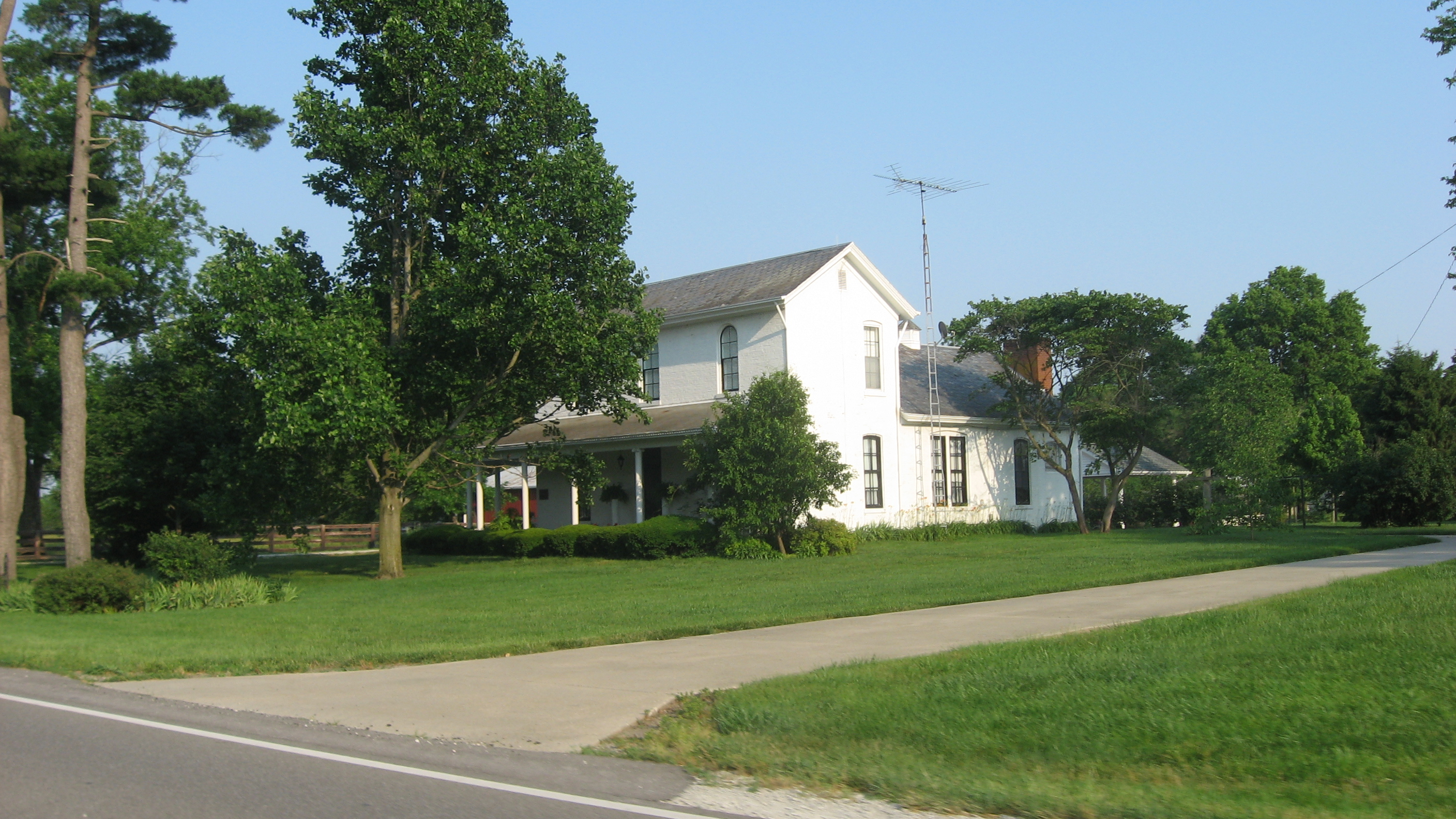
- Beatty–Trimpe Farmhouse, June 2011

- Location within Indiana Location within the United States
- Location: 4475 E. State Road 258, west of Seymour in Hamilton Township, Jackson County, Indiana
- Coordinates: 38°58′24″N 85°57′0″W
- Area: 3.5 acres (1.4 ha)
- Built: 1874
- Architectural style: Italianate, I-House
- NRHP reference No.: 03000138
- Added to NRHP: March 26, 2003

Beatty–Trimpe Farm, also known as the Beatty–Kasting–Trimpe Farm, is a historic home and farm located in Hamilton Township, Jackson County, Indiana. The farmhouse was built in 1874, and is a two-story, brick Italianate style I-house with a one-story rear ell. A one-story addition was constructed in 1970. Also on the property are the contributing smokehouse (c. 1874), ice house, scale shed (c. 1910), round roof barn (c. 1949), granary / corn crib (c. 1949), garage / workshop (c. 1949), and English barn (1850s).

It was listed on the National Register of Historic Places in 2003.
