= Hoosier National Forest =

United States National Forest in Indiana

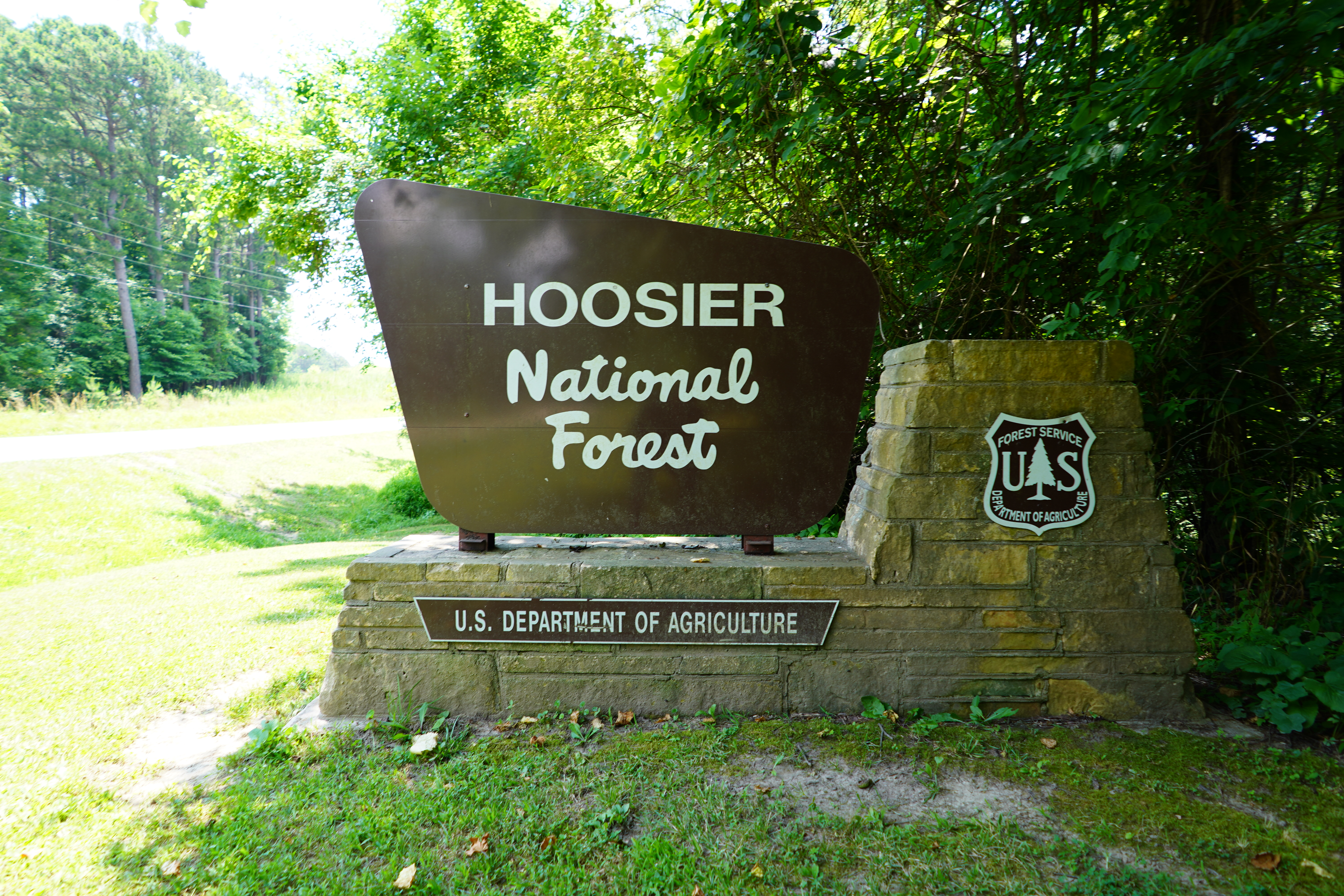
- Hoosier National Forest

- Location within the United States
- Location: Indiana, United States
- Nearest city: Bloomington, IN
- Coordinates: 38°28′39″N 86°31′30″W
- Area: 204,303 acres (826.78 km^{2})
- Established: October 1, 1961
- Governing body: U.S. Forest Service
- Website: Hoosier National Forest

The Hoosier National Forest is a property managed by the United States Forest Service in the hills of Southern Indiana. Composed of four separate sections, each of which has many parcels, it has a total area of 204,303 acres (827 km^{2}; 319 sq mi). Hoosier National Forest's headquarters are located in Bedford, with a regional office in Tell City. Prominent places within the Forest include the Lick Creek Settlement Site, the Potts Creek Rockshelter Archeological Site, and the Jacob Rickenbaugh House.

== History ==
Hoosier National Forest was first touched by humanity 12,000 years ago, when Native Americans in the United States hunted in the forest. Europeans reached the forest in the late 17th century, and began building villages in the forest. Actual lumbering began in the 19th century, with the cutting of more difficult terrain occurring after 1865. By 1910 most of the area had been cut. In the early 1930s the governor of Indiana pushed for the federal government to do something with the eroding lands that saw its residents leaving, with the act being accomplished on February 6, 1935.

Within Hoosier National Forest, two miles (3 km) south of Chambersburg, lies the former Lick Creek Settlement, a settlement of free blacks led by the Quaker Jonathan Lindley from around 1819 to around 1865. Pioneer Mothers Memorial Forest near Paoli contains an excellent example of virgin forest. Hemlock Cliffs Recreation Area in Crawford County contains one of the most scenic hiking trails in Indiana.

Most of Thomas Hines' Hines' Raid was within the present-day Hoosier National Forest.

Hickory Ridge Lookout Tower is the sole remaining fire tower out of eight that once stood within Hoosier National Forest. When built, there was a two-room house for the ranger and his dependents to live within, but it has since been destroyed. Visitors may still climb the tower but are advised to be cautious when climbing.

Maumee Scout Reservation and Lake Tarzian are also located within the Hoosier National Forest. Lake Tarzian is named after Sarkes Tarzian who led the capital campaign to build the camp.

== Science ==
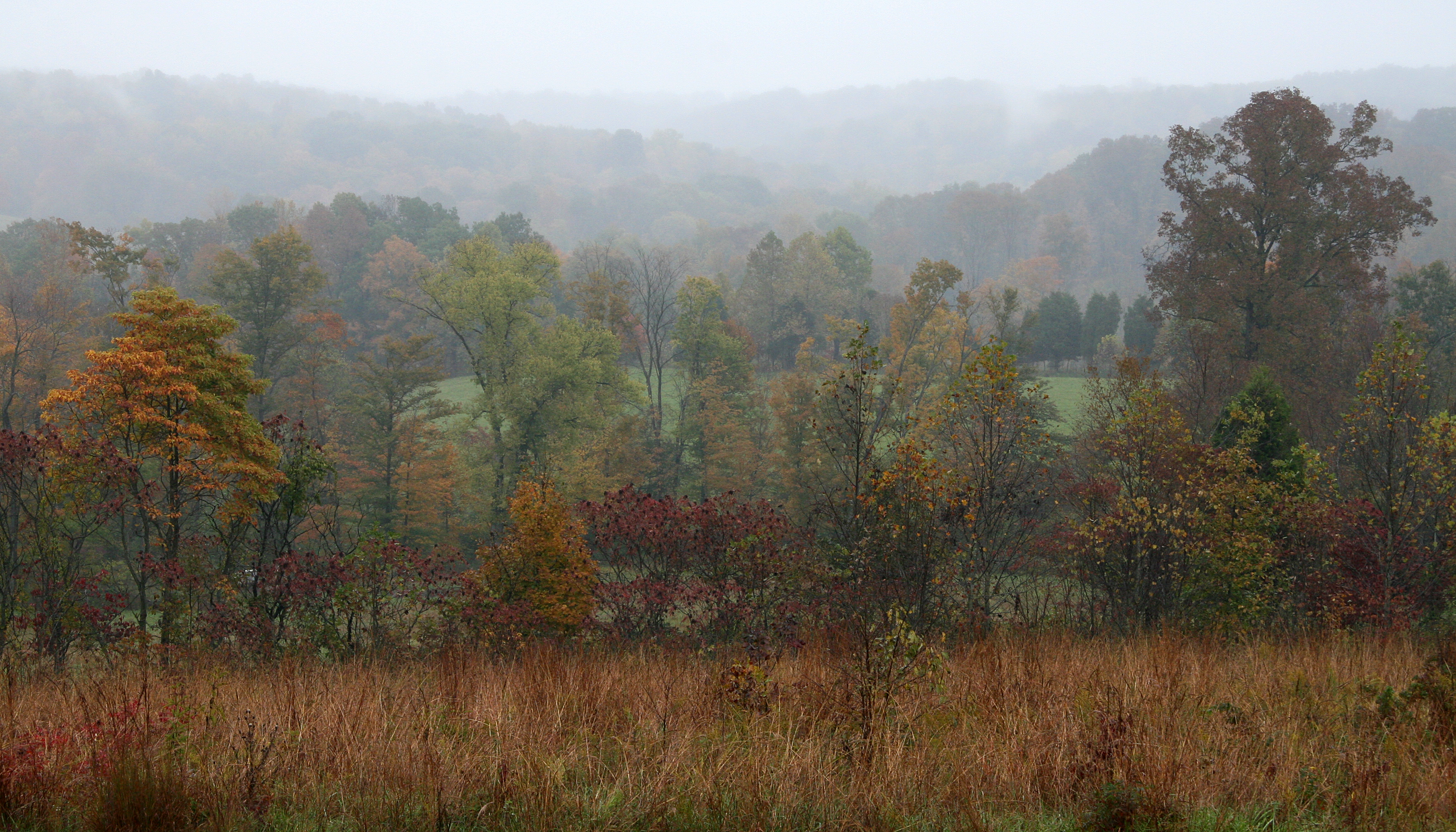
Forested hills in Orange County near Patoka Lake

Much of Hoosier National Forest is over karst, responsible for the many caves in southern Indiana.

Included in Hoosier National Forest is the Charles C. Deam Wilderness Area, the only recognized wilderness area left in Indiana. This means that no motorized vehicles are allowed in the area, and instead mules and horses must be used to maintain hiking trails.

In the Clover Lick Barrens, the southern portion of Hoosier National Forest near the Ohio River, the vegetation is more typical of that found on prairies in the Great Plains. This was discovered by a botanist and biologist from the Indiana Department of Natural Resources, who later found that in the first recorded survey of the area in 2005, the land was described not as forest, but as "a mile of poor barrens and grassy hills". It is believed that the inability of tall oaks to grow in the area allows for this prairie vegetation to persist in such an unlikely location. In 2006 a conscious effort was made to keep the barren look to the area; previous federal efforts on renovating Hoosier National Forest meant adding nonnative species to low-growth areas. It was around Clover Lick in 1972 that Indiana decided to reintroduce wild turkeys back to Indiana, dedicating 6,000 acres (2,400 ha) for the purpose.

Also found in Hoosier National Forest is Sundance Lake, a 5.3-acre (2.1 ha) lake.

Hoosier National Forest lies in parts of nine counties in southern Indiana.

== Recreation ==
The trail system has almost 266 miles (428 km), and allows horseback riding and mountain bikes, along with hiking. Hikers are to yield to horses, and mountain bikers are to yield to both of them. Within the Hemlock Cliffs Valley, located within the central portion of the National Forest, there is the 1.2 mile Hemlock Cliffs trail. The trail is noted as access to sandstone cliffs and seasonal waterfalls as well as Hemlock trees and rare wintergreen plants.

=== Hoosier National Forest Trail System ===
All trail locations are within the state of Indiana.

| Trail | Location | Uses | Length (miles) |
|---|---|---|---|
| Birdseye Trail | Birdseye | Hiking, horse riding, and mountain biking | 12.1 |
| Brown County D Trail | Elkinsville | Hiking and horse riding | 2.1 |
| Buzzard Roost Trail | Magnet | Hiking | 0.8 |
| Celina Interpretive Trail | Indian-Celina Lake Recreation Area | Hiking | 0.8 |
| Fork Ridge Trail | Norman, north of Kurtz | Hiking | 3.5 |
| German Ridge Trail | Derby | Hiking, horse riding, and mountain biking | 24.0 |
| German Ridge Lake Trail | Derby | Hiking | 1.9 |
| Hardin Ridge Trail | Lake Monroe; Hardin Ridge Recreation Area | Hiking and biking | 2.0 |
| Hemlock Cliffs Trail | English | Hiking | 1.0 |
| Hickory Ridge Trail | Norman | Hiking, horse riding, and mountain biking | 48.7 |
| Lick Creek Trail | Paoli | Hiking, horse riding, and mountain biking | 7.7 |
| Mogan Ridge West Trail | Derby | Hiking, horse riding, and mountain biking | 12.3 |
| Mogan Ridge East Trail | Derby | Hiking | 6.7 |
| Nebo Ridge Trail | Nashville | Hiking, horseriding, and mountain biking | 8.6 |
| Oriole West Trail | Sulphur | Hiking, horseriding, and mountain biking | 7.2 |
| Oriole East Trail | Sulphur | Hiking, horseriding, and mountain biking | 6.5 |
| Pate Hollow Trail | Lake Monroe; Paynetown State Recreation Area | Hiking | 7.7 |
| Pioneer Mothers Trail | Paoli | Hiking | 1.3 |
| Saddle Lake Trail | Gatchel; east of Derby | Hiking | 2.2 |
| Shirley Creek Trail | West Baden Springs | Hiking, horse riding, and mountain biking | 19.4 |
| Spring(s) Valley Trail | Paoli | Hiking, horse riding, and mountain biking | 12.7 |
| Tipsaw Trail | Branchville; Tipsaw Lake Recreation Area | Hiking and mountain biking | 5.9 |
| Twin Oaks Interpretive Trail | Lake Monroe | Hiking | 1.4 |
| Two Lakes Loop National Recreation Trail | Indian-Celina Lake Recreation Area | Hiking | 15.7 |
| Wilderness West | Lake Monroe; Charles C. Deam Wilderness | Hiking and horse riding | 32.4 |
| Wilderness Sycamore | Lake Monroe; Charles C. Deam Wilderness | Hiking | 4.9 |
| Youngs Creek Trail | Paoli | Hiking, horse riding, and mountain biking | 11.0 |

== See also ==
- Charles C. Deam Wilderness Area
- List of national forests of the United States
