= Acme, Indiana =

- Unincorporated community
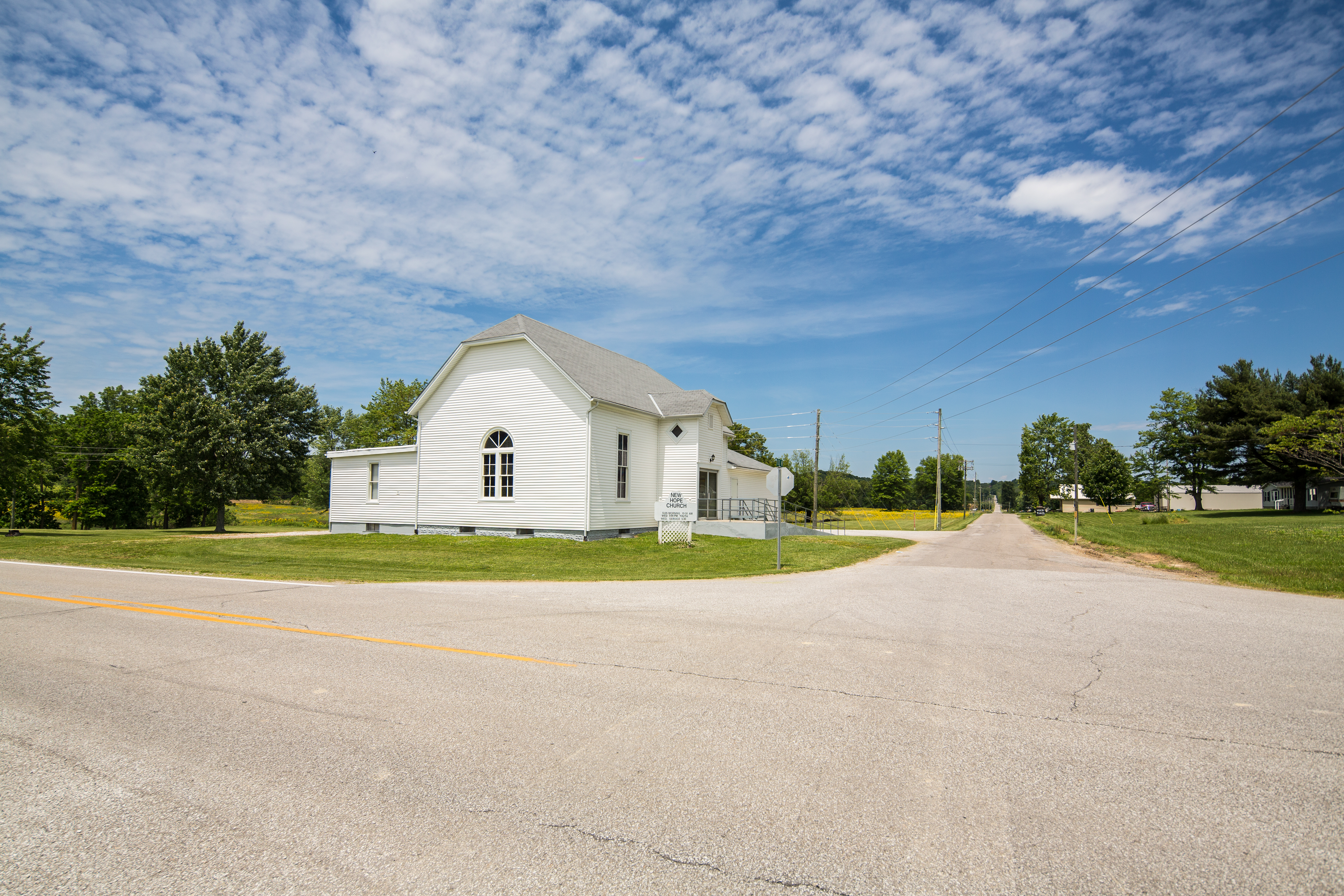
- Acme as seen in 2016

- Location within Indiana Location within the United States
- Coordinates: 38°58′41″N 86°03′32″W
- Country: United States
- State: Indiana
- County: Jackson
- Township: Hamilton
- Elevation: 610 ft (190 m)

Population (2000)
  - Total: 30
- ZIP code: 47274
- FIPS code: 18-00244
- GNIS feature ID: 429998

Acme is an unincorporated community in Hamilton Township, Jackson County, Indiana.

== History ==
A post office was established in Acme in 1884, and remained in operation until it was discontinued in 1891. Acme is likely derived from a Greek word meaning "best".
