= Houston, Indiana =

- Unincorporated community
- Location within Indiana Location within the United States
- Coordinates: 39°00′59″N 86°11′27″W
- Country: United States
- State: Indiana
- County: Jackson
- Township: Salt Creek
- Elevation: 591 ft (180 m)
- ZIP code: 47264
- FIPS code: 18-34870
- GNIS feature ID: 451069

Houston is an unincorporated community in Salt Creek Township, Jackson County, Indiana.

== History ==
A post office was established at Houston in 1850, and remained in operation until it was discontinued in 1911. Houston was laid out in 1853, and named for Leonard Houston, a pioneer settler.
