= Clear Spring, Indiana =

- Unincorporated community
- Location within Indiana Location within the United States
- Coordinates: 38°55′30″N 86°12′36″W
- Country: United States
- State: Indiana
- County: Jackson
- Township: Owen
- Elevation: 879 ft (268 m)
- ZIP code: 47264
- FIPS code: 18-13450
- GNIS feature ID: 450782

Clear Spring is an unincorporated community in Owen Township, Jackson County, Indiana.

== History ==
Clear Spring was platted in 1839. The community took its name from a spring near the original town site.
