= Norman, Indiana =

- Unincorporated community
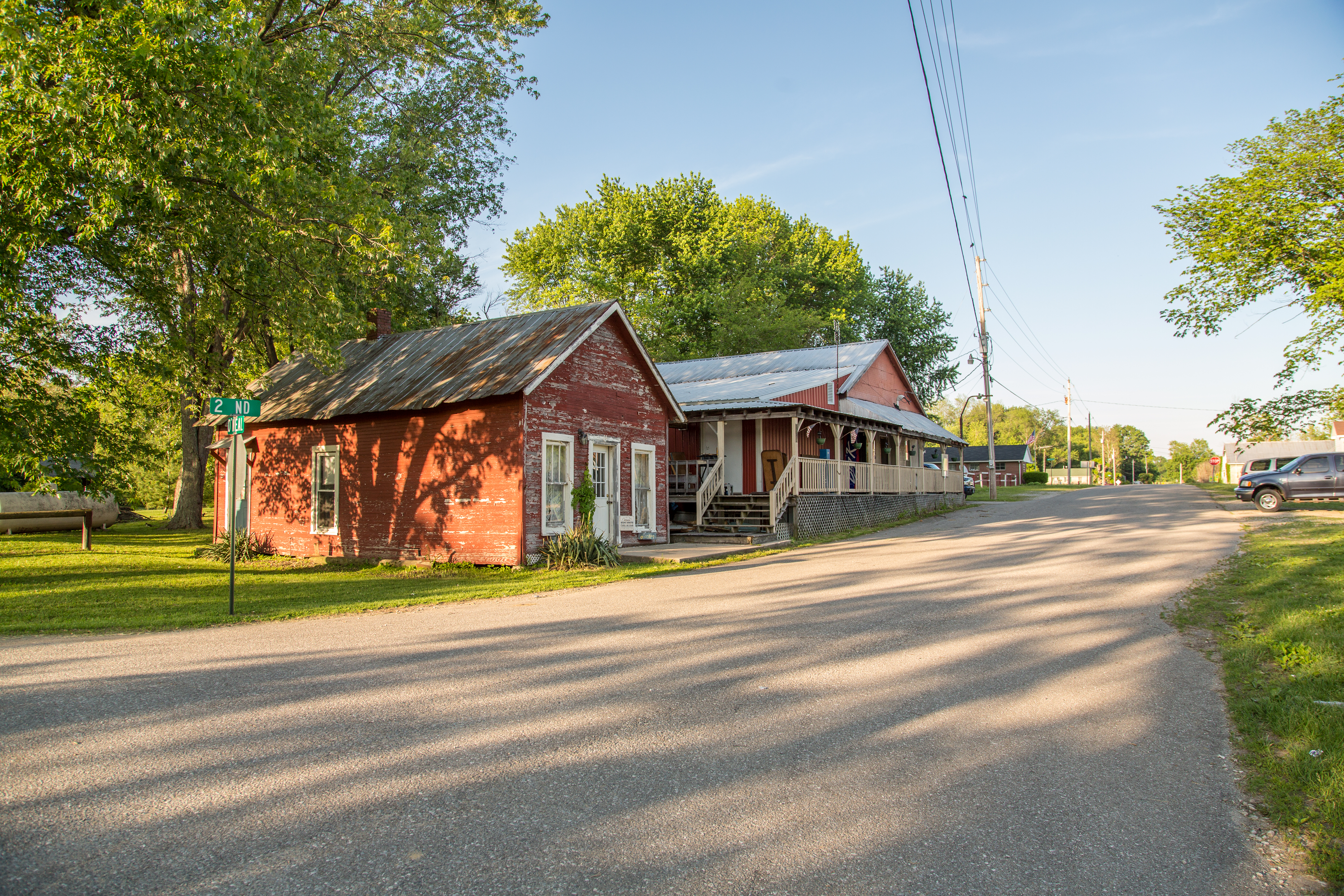

- Location within Indiana Location within the United States
- Coordinates: 38°57′09″N 86°16′30″W
- Country: United States
- State: Indiana
- County: Jackson
- Township: Owen
- Elevation: 866 ft (264 m)
- ZIP code: 47264
- GNIS feature ID: 451280

Norman (also Norman Station) is an unincorporated town in northwestern Owen Township, Jackson County, Indiana, United States. It lies along State Road 58 northwest of Brownstown, the county seat of Jackson County. Because the community had two different names, the Board on Geographic Names officially decided in favor of "Norman" in 1943. It has a post office, with the ZIP code of 47264.

== History ==
Norman was established in 1889, and named for its founder, John A. Norman. The post office, which opened as Norman Station in 1890, was officially renamed Norman in 1935.
