= Frank Wheeler Hotel =

Historic hotel in Indiana, United States

- U.S. National Register of Historic Places
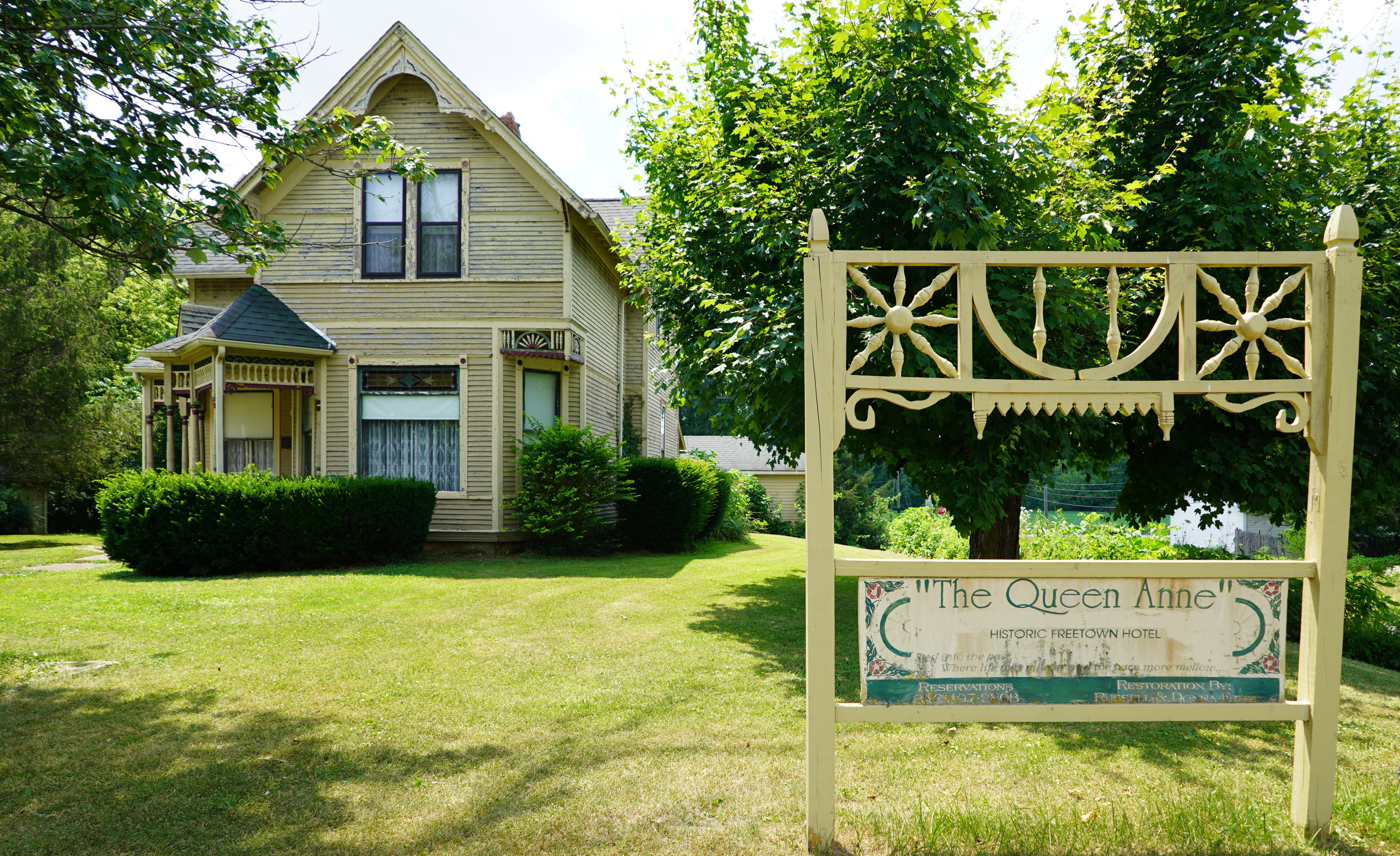
- Frank Wheeler Hotel, June 2024

- Location within Indiana Location within the United States
- Interactive map showing the location of Frank Wheeler Hotel
- Location: Jct. of Second and Main Sts., Freetown, Indiana
- Coordinates: 38°58′24″N 86°8′2″W
- Area: less than one acre
- Built: c. 1890
- Architectural style: Queen Anne
- NRHP reference No.: 91001161
- Added to NRHP: August 29, 1991

Frank Wheeler Hotel, also known as the Brown-Wheeler House, is a historic hotel building located at Freetown, Indiana. It was built in 1890, and is a modest two-story, Queen Anne style frame building. The building features asymmetrical massing, multiple gables, and a large porch with turned and decorative woodwork. Also on the property are the contributing shed and privy. Built as a private dwelling, it housed a hotel from 1905 to 1938.

It was listed on the National Register of Historic Places in 1991.
