= Magnet, Indiana =

Magnet, Indiana Rono
- Unincorporated community
- Location within Indiana Location within the United States
- Coordinates: 38°05′48″N 86°27′48″W
- Country: United States
- State: Indiana
- County: Perry
- Township: Union
- Elevation: 492 ft (150 m)
- Time zone: UTC-6 (Central (CST))
  - Summer (DST): UTC-5 (CDT)
- ZIP code: 47520
- Area codes: 812, 930
- GNIS feature ID: 451192

Magnet is an unincorporated community along the Ohio River in Union Township, Perry County, in the U.S. state of Indiana.

== History ==
When pioneers started to settle the banks of the Ohio River, one of the first in the Magnet area was Dodson, who operated a wood yard. The settlement was known as Dodson Landing. When Dodson left, Jesse Martin took over the wood yard operation; therefore the area was referred to as Martin Landing. In 1848 the residents had to decide on a name for the village. To honor Jesse Martin they chose the name Rono, the name of Martin's dog. The settlement was known as Rono until 1899 when the United States Postal Department changed the name to Magnet. The Magnet post office closed in 1992.

=== Civil War Memorial Grave ===
The Civil War Memorial Grave historical marker near Magnet.

On August 21, 1865, the steamboat, U.S.S. Argosy (Number 3) was returning Union soldiers of the 70th Ohio Infantry home via the Ohio River. The steamer was forced aground by a storm. Her boilers exploded and caused ten fatalities. They were buried in a mass grave one half mile from Magnet (then called Rono). Ten grave makers were raised at the site.

Local historian Bert Fenn discovered information that suggested one of the ten who was supposedly buried in the grave may have actually lived until arriving in Louisville, where he died. This could explain why one of the soldiers buried in the grave is an unknown soldier.

The Civil War Memorial Grave historical marker at the site erected by the Indiana Civil War Centennial Commission in 1965.

== See also ==
- List of cities and towns along the Ohio River
