= Indiana State Road 258 =

State highway in Indiana, United States

State Road 258
- SR 258 highlighted in red

Route information
- Maintained by INDOT
- Length: 12.797 mi (20.595 km)

Major junctions
- West end: SR 58 near Freetown
- East end: SR 11 at Seymour

Location
- Country: United States
- State: Indiana
- Counties: Jackson

Highway system
- Indiana State Highway System; Interstate; US; State; Scenic
← SR 257	→ SR 261

State Road 258 is a short undivided two-lane road in Jackson County in the southern part of the U.S. state of Indiana.

== Route description ==
State Road 258 begins at State Road 58 about a mile northeast of the small town of Freetown. From here, it runs east to State Road 11 in Seymour, a distance of approximately 13 miles (21 km). State Road 258 runs east from Freetown, while its parent route State Road 58 angles to the northeast on its way to the Columbus area.

== Major intersections ==
The entire route is in Jackson County.

Location	mi	km	Destinations	Notes
Pershing Township	0.000	0.000	SR 58 – Freetown, Columbus	Western terminus of SR 258
Seymour	12.797	20.595	SR 11 to I-65	Eastern terminus of SR 258
1.000 mi = 1.609 km; 1.000 km = 0.621 mi

== History ==
The Bell Ford Bridge was located next to State Road 258 until it collapsed in 2006.
