= Shields' Mill Covered Bridge =

- U.S. National Register of Historic Places
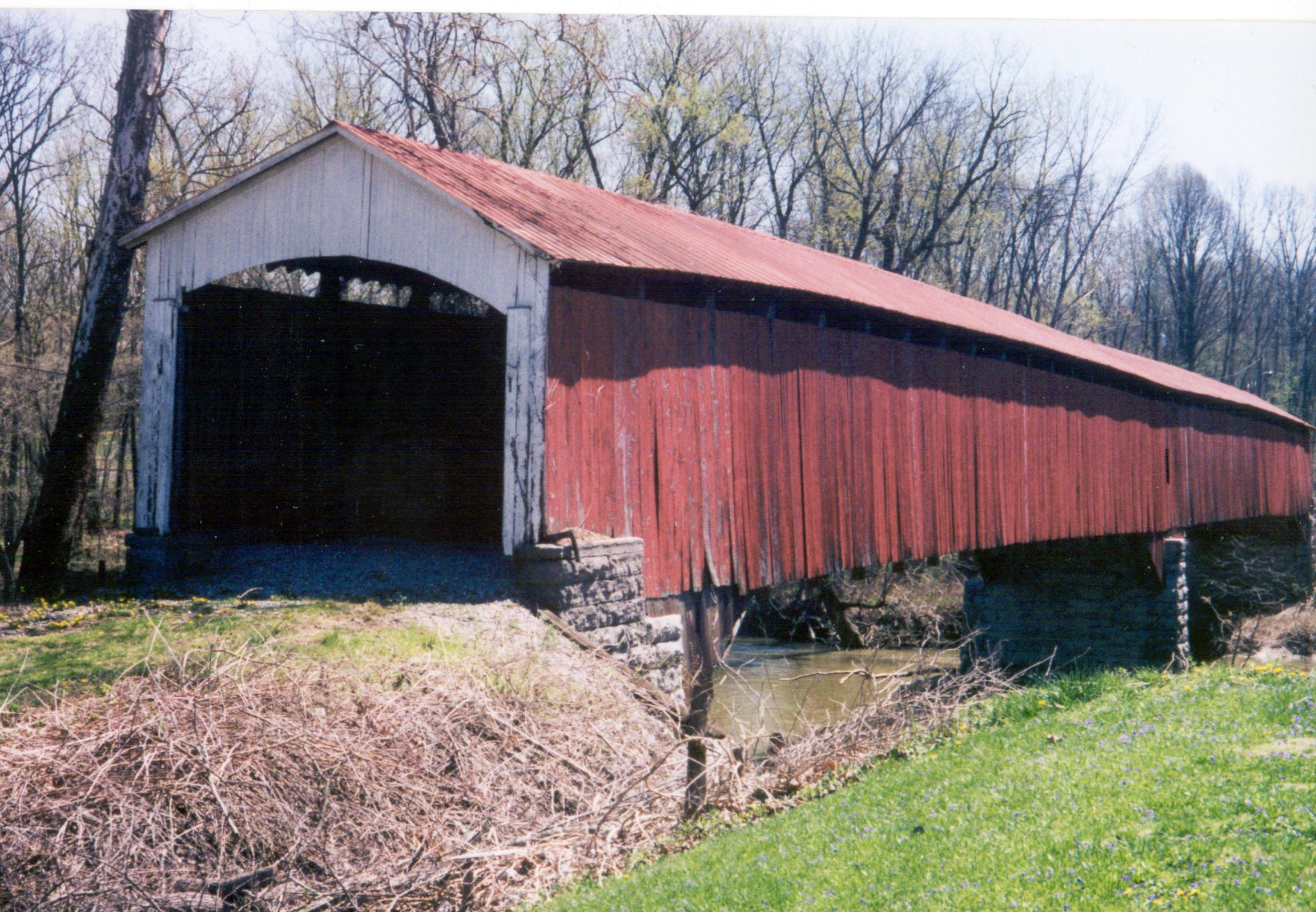
- Shieldstown Covered Bridge, December 2015

- Location within Indiana Location within the United States
- Location: Shields Rd. across the East Fork of the White River, Brownstown Township and Hamilton Township, Jackson County, Indiana
- Coordinates: 38°54′54.69″N 86°0′9.17″W
- Area: Less than 1 acre (0.40 ha)
- Built: 1876
- Built by: Daniels, J.J.; Brown, Daniel Helper; Stanford, James
- Architectural style: multiple kingpost Burr Arch Truss
- NRHP reference No.: 16000330
- Added to NRHP: June 7, 2016

Shields' Mill Covered Bridge, also known as Shieldstown Covered Bridge, is a historic covered bridge located in Brownstown Township and Hamilton Township, Jackson County, Indiana. It spans the White River and is a multiple kingpost Burr Arch Truss bridge. It was built 1876, and is a two-span wooden bridge resting on cut limestone pier and abutments. It measures 365 feet, 6 inches, long. The bridge was closed to traffic in 1970.

It was listed on the National Register of Historic Places in 2016. The bridge was restored in 2019.
