= Salt Creek Township, Jackson County, Indiana =

Salt Creek Township
- Township
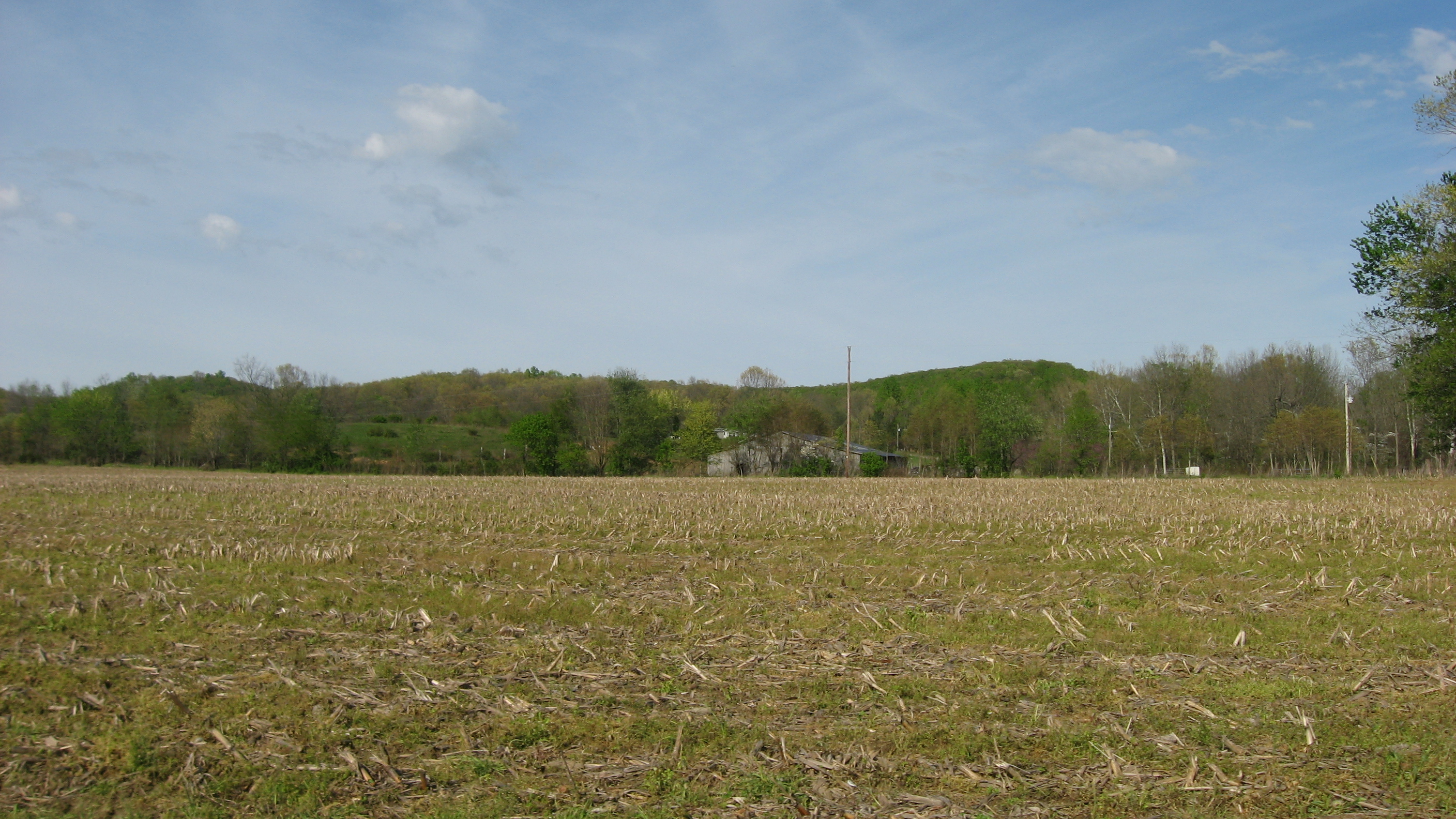
- Countryside in the township

- Location in Jackson County
- Coordinates: 39°00′59″N 86°14′11″W
- Country: United States
- State: Indiana
- County: Jackson

Government
  - Type: Indiana township

Area
  - Total: 43.03 sq mi (111.4 km^{2})
  - Land: 42.83 sq mi (110.9 km^{2})
  - Water: 0.2 sq mi (0.52 km^{2}) 0.46%
- Elevation: 554 ft (169 m)

Population (2020)
  - Total: 299
  - Density: 6.98/sq mi (2.70/km^{2})
- GNIS feature ID: 0453828

Salt Creek Township is one of twelve townships in Jackson County, Indiana, United States. As of the 2020 census, its population was 299 and it contained 153 housing units.

Historical population
Census	Pop.	Note	%±
1890	2,466		—
1900	2,538		2.9%
1910	1,935		−23.8%
1920	754		−61.0%
1930	528		−30.0%
1940	523		−0.9%
1950	436		−16.6%
1960	357		−18.1%
1970	279		−21.8%
1980	314		12.5%
1990	309		−1.6%
2000	309		0.0%
2010	344		11.3%
2020	299		−13.1%
Source: US Decennial Census

== Geography ==
According to the 2010 census, the township has a total area of 43.03 square miles (111.4 km^{2}), of which 42.83 square miles (110.9 km^{2}) (or 99.54%) is land and 0.2 square miles (0.52 km^{2}) (or 0.46%) is water. The streams of Callahan Branch, Combs Branch, Combs Creek, Fleetwood Branch, Lincoln Back Branch, Little Salt Creek, Negro Creek, Pruitt Branch and Tipton Creek run through this township.

=== Unincorporated towns ===
- Houston

=== Adjacent townships ===
- Washington Township, Brown County (north)
- Van Buren Township, Brown County (northeast)
- Pershing Township (east)
- Owen Township (south)
- Pleasant Run Township, Lawrence County (southwest)
- Polk Township, Monroe County (west)

=== Cemeteries ===
The township contains seven cemeteries: Callahan, Cornett, Cummings, Hanner, Lutes, Robinson and Thompson.
