= USS Champion (1859) =

Gunboat of the United States Navy

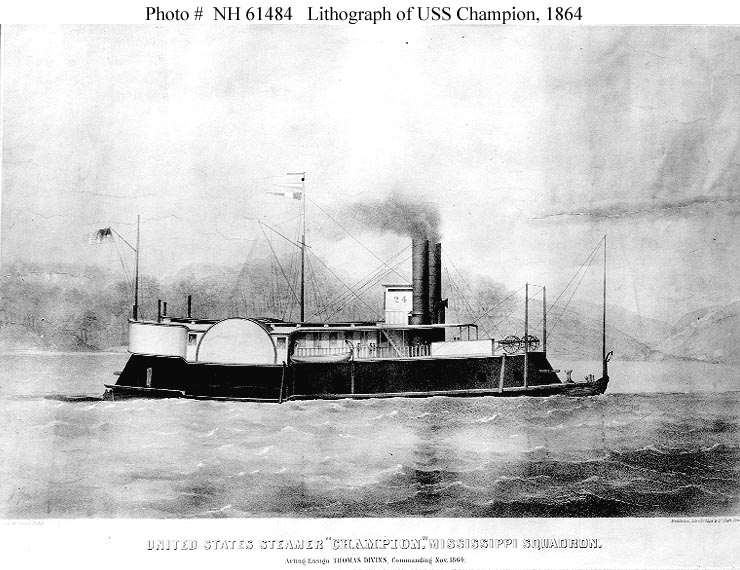
- USS Champion

History

United States
- Name: USS Champion
- Launched: 1859
- Acquired: 14 March 1863
- Commissioned: 26 April 1863
- Decommissioned: 1 July 1865
- Fate: Sold, 29 November 1865

General characteristics
- Type: Gunboat
- Displacement: 115 long tons (117 t)
- Length: 145 ft 8 in (44.40 m)
- Beam: 26 ft 5 in (8.05 m)
- Draft: 3 ft 6 in (1.07 m)
- Propulsion: Steam engine; side wheel-propelled
- Speed: 4 knots (7.4 km/h; 4.6 mph)
- Armament: 2 × 30-pounder guns; 1 × 24-pounder gun; 1 × 12-pounder gun

USS Champion was a small gunboat originally built as the commercial vessel Champion No. 4 in Cincinnati, Ohio in 1859. She was purchased for the Union Navy in 1863 during the American Civil War, serving until July 1865, when she was sold back to civilian service.

== Service history ==
Champion, an armed river steamer, was built in Cincinnati, Ohio, in 1859 as Champion No. 4; purchased there on 14 March 1863; fitted out at Cairo, Illinois; and commissioned on 26 April 1863, Acting Master Alfred Phelps Jr., in command. Operating almost continuously from 27 April 1863 – 9 June 1865, Champion patrolled the Mississippi River, Tennessee River, and the Red River. She transported troops, prisoners, supplies, and cotton; towed and convoyed ships; and delivered dispatches. Her yeoman service ended at Mound City, Illinois, where she was decommissioned on 1 July. Champion was sold 29 November 1865.
