= USS Queen City =

Gunboat of the United States Navy

Coordinates: 34.6934°N 91.3173°W

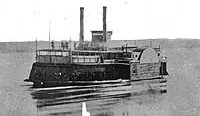
- USS Queen City

History

United States
- Name: Queen City
- Acquired: 13 February 1863
- Commissioned: 1 April 1863
- Out of service: 24 June 1864
- Stricken: 1864 (est.)
- Captured: by Confederate forces; 24 June 1864
- Fate: Blown up, 1864

General characteristics
- Displacement: 212 tons
- Propulsion: steam engine; side wheel-propelled
- Armament: two 30-pounder Parrott rifles; two 32-pounder guns; four 24-pounder howitzers
- Armour: tinclad

USS Queen City was a steamer acquired by the Union Navy during the American Civil War. She was used by the Navy as a gunboat and assigned to patrol navigable waterways of the Confederacy to prevent the South from trading with other countries.

== Service history ==
Queen City, a wooden, side wheel steamer, was purchased by the Union Navy at Cincinnati, Ohio, from Samuel Wiggins, on 13 February 1863. The vessel was commissioned at Cincinnati on 1 April 1863, Acting Master Jason Goudy in command.

The "tinclad" gunboat (No. 26) operated tip the Tennessee River supporting Union Army operations in the area through the spring. In the summer she transferred to the Mississippi River and patrolled the river protecting Union lines of supply and communications. On 13 October she departed Helena, Arkansas, and carried troops to Friars Point, Mississippi, where they landed and surrounded the town. The next morning they seized a large quantity of cotton.

=== Capture ===
In ensuing months, she continued operations along the rivers of Arkansas. Off Clarendon, Arkansas, on 24 June, two regiments of Confederate cavalry supported by artillery attacked Queen City disabling the paddle wheel steamer and forcing her commander to surrender. When USS Tyler attempted to recover the ship, the Confederates blew her up.

== See also ==
- Anaconda Plan
- Mississippi Squadron
