= National Register of Historic Places listings in Jennings County, Indiana =

Location of Jennings County in Indiana

This is a list of the National Register of Historic Places listings in Jennings County, Indiana.

This is intended to be a complete list of the properties and districts on the National Register of Historic Places in Jennings County, Indiana, United States. Latitude and longitude coordinates are provided for many National Register properties and districts; these locations may be seen together in a map.

There are 10 properties and districts listed on the National Register in the county.

Properties and districts located in incorporated areas display the name of the municipality, while properties and districts in unincorporated areas display the name of their civil township. Properties and districts split between multiple jurisdictions display the names of all jurisdictions.

This National Park Service list is complete through NPS recent listings posted August 29, 2025.

== Current listings ==
	Name on the Register	Image	Date listed	Location	City or town	Description
1	Annadale	Annadale	January 25, 2007 (#06001292)	502 S. Jennings St. 39°00′09″N 85°37′20″W	North Vernon	
2	Benville Bridge		July 30, 1996 (#96000789)	US Army Jefferson Proving Ground, approximately 1 mile east off Perimeter Rd. 38°58′50″N 85°27′10″W	Bigger Township	
3	Edward's Ford Bridge		July 30, 1996 (#96000788)	US Army Jefferson Proving Ground, off Northwest Rd. 39°02′01″N 85°27′38″W	Campbell Township	
4	Hicklin House and Settlement		March 31, 2023 (#100008661)	2330 South Cty. Rd. 675 East; 38°56′45″N 85°29′20″W	San Jacinto vicinity	
5	James Covered Bridge	James Covered Bridge	August 24, 2022 (#100008061)	Cty. Rd. 650S over Graham Cr. approx. 1/2 mi. east of IN 3; 38°53′34″N 85°36′56″W	Lovett Township	
6	North Vernon Downtown Historic District	North Vernon Downtown Historic District	April 19, 2006 (#06000306)	Bounded by 6th and Chestnut Sts., Keller St., 4th and Main, and Jennings; 39°00′20″N 85°37′28″W	North Vernon	
7	Scipio Covered Bridge	Scipio Covered Bridge	August 24, 2022 (#100008062)	Cty. Rd. 575W over Sand Cr. approx. 200 ft. southeast of Cty. Rd. 700N crossing point 39°05′05″N 85°43′13″W	Scipio	
8	State Street Historic District	State Street Historic District	January 25, 2007 (#06001290)	Roughly bounded by Chestnut, Jackson, Jefferson, and State Sts. 39°00′04″N 85°37′24″W	North Vernon	
9	Vernon Historic District	Vernon Historic District	August 27, 1976 (#76000024)	1 mile south of North Vernon on State Roads State Road 3 and State Road 7; 38°59′06″N 85°36′40″W	Vernon and Vernon Township	
10	Walnut Street Historic District	Walnut Street Historic District	September 20, 2006 (#06000855)	Roughly including both sides of Walnut St. between State and Gum Sts. 39°00′11″N 85°37′38″W	North Vernon	

== See also ==
- List of National Historic Landmarks in Indiana
- National Register of Historic Places listings in Indiana
- Listings in neighboring counties: Bartholomew, Decatur, Jackson, Jefferson, Ripley, Scott
- List of Indiana state historical markers in Jennings County
