= List of Indiana state historical markers in Jennings County =

Location of Jennings County in Indiana

This is a list of the Indiana state historical markers in Jennings County.

This is intended to be a complete list of the official state historical markers placed in Jennings County, Indiana, United States by the Indiana Historical Bureau. The locations of the historical markers and their latitude and longitude coordinates are included below when available, along with their names, years of placement, and topics as recorded by the Historical Bureau. There are 7 historical markers located in Jennings County.

== Historical markers ==
Marker title	Image	Year placed	Location	Topics
Grouseland Treaty Line (August 21, 1805)		1966	State Road 7 southeast of Scipio; 39°3′48″N 85°41′54″W	Early Settlement and Exploration, American Indian/Native American
Hannah Milhous Nixon		1969	Junction of U.S. Route 50 and County Road 325N near Butlerville; 39°2′0.6″N 85°30′30″W	Women, Politics
Jonathan Jennings, 1784-1834		1995	By the junction of State Roads 3 and 7 on the southern corner of the courthouse square in Vernon; 38°59′5″N 85°36′30″W	Politics
Morgan's Raid		1997	Southwestern corner of the courthouse square in Vernon; 38°59′5.1″N 85°36′33″W	Military
Kellar Grist Mill		1997	Along N. Base Road, 0.5 miles south of Brewersville and 0.5 miles north of the Sand Creek bridge, north of North Vernon; 39°4′40″N 85°36′40″W	Business, Industry, and Labor, Transportation
Muscatatuck Park		1999	At the park entrance, along State Road 7 by its junction with County Road 325N near North Vernon; 38°59′25″N 85°37′1″W	Nature and Natural Disasters
Vernon Historic District		2003	Southwestern corner of the courthouse lawn in Vernon; 38°59′5″N 85°36′32″W	Historic District, Neighborhoods, and Towns, Early Settlement and Exploration

== See also ==
- List of Indiana state historical markers
- National Register of Historic Places listings in Jennings County, Indiana
