= New (surname) =

New is an English surname, occurring in Britain and countries to which British people have emigrated, including Australia, Canada, New Zealand, etc.

In England, the family name New is particularly known from Warwickshire, Gloucestershire, Worcestershire, Wiltshire and Dorset.

Some immigrants of Central European origins with names like Neu or Neumann have anglicised their family name to New.

Notable people with the surname include:

- Chris New (born 1981), British actor
- Edmund Hort New, English illustrator
- George New (1894–1963), American artist
- Hannah New (born 1984), British actress
- Jane New, wife of band leader Tommy Dorsey
- Jeptha Dudley New (1830–1892), U.S. Representative from Indiana
- Jethro New (1757–1825), frontiersman and Continental Army soldier
- John C. New (1831–1906), Treasurer of the United States, 1875–76
- John D. New (1924–1944), U.S. Medal of Honor recipient
- Kimberly New, American politician from Georgia
- Maria New (1928–2024), an American professor of pediatrics, Genomics and Genetics
- Robert A. New (1789–1856), 1st Secretary of State of Indiana
- Tom New (born 1985), English cricketer
- W. H. New (born 1938), Canadian poet and literary critic
