= Indiana's 4th congressional district =

U.S. House district for Indiana

Coordinates: 40°N 87°W

- Interactive map of district boundaries since January 3, 2023
- Representative: Jim Baird; R–Greencastle
- Area: 4,016.44 mi^{2} (10,402.5 km^{2})
- Distribution: 68.17% urban; 31.83% rural
- Population (2025): 792,769
- Median household income: $79,523
- Ethnicity: 81.4% White; 7.1% Hispanic; 4.0% Two or more races; 3.8% Black; 3.1% Asian; 0.5% other
- Cook PVI: R+15

Indiana's 4th congressional district is a congressional district in the U.S. state of Indiana. From 2003 to 2013 the district was based primarily in the central part of the state, and consisted of all of Boone, Clinton, Hendricks, Morgan, Lawrence, Montgomery, and Tippecanoe counties and parts of Fountain, Johnson, Marion, Monroe, and White counties. The district surrounded Indianapolis, including the suburban area of Greenwood, and encompassed the more exurban areas of Crawfordsville and Bedford, as well as the college town of Lafayette-West Lafayette, containing Purdue University.

Prior to the 2000 U.S. census, most of the territory currently in the 4th Congressional District was located in the 7th Congressional District; the old 4th Congressional District was the Fort Wayne district, which is now the 3rd Congressional District. From the 2012 redistricting, the district shifted slightly north and west to include the Illinois border, while losing the eastern Indianapolis suburbs. It currently includes Crawfordsville, Lafayette, the western Indianapolis suburbs, and portions of Kokomo.

The district is currently represented by Republican Jim Baird, who succeeded Todd Rokita, who vacated his House seat to run for the Indiana U.S. Senate seat held by Democrat Joe Donnelly, losing the Republican nomination to eventual senator Mike Braun. Baird was elected on November 6.

== Composition ==
For the 118th and successive Congresses (based on redistricting following the 2020 census), the district contains all or portions of the following counties and townships:

Benton County (11)

All 11 townships

Boone County (12)

All 12 townships

Carroll County (14)

All 14 townships

Cass County (7)

Boone, Clinton, Deer Creek (part, also 2nd), Eel, Jefferson, Noble, Washington (part, also 2nd)

Clinton County (14)

All 14 townships

Fountain County (6)

Cain (part, also 8th), Davis, Logan, Richland, Shawnee, Troy (part, also 8th)

Hendricks County (12)

All 12 townships

Howard County (1)

Honey Creek (part, also 5th; includes part of Russiaville)

Jasper County (13)

All 13 townships

Montgomery County (11)

All 11 townships

Morgan County (41)

All 14 townships

Newton County (10)

All 10 townships

Putnam County (13)

All 13 townships

Tippecanoe County (13)

All 13 townships

Warren County (12)

All 12 townships

White County (12)

All 12 townships

== Recent election results from statewide races ==
Year	Office	Results
2008	President	McCain 55% - 43%
2012	President	Romney 64% - 36%
2012	Senate	Mourdock 51% - 42%
2012	Governor	Pence 56% - 39%
2016	President	Trump 64% - 30%
2016	Senate	Young 60% - 34%
2016	Governor	Holcomb 59% - 38%
2016	Attorney General	Hill 71% - 29%
2018	Senate	Braun 58% - 37%
2020	President	Trump 63% - 34%
2020	Governor	Holcomb 59% - 25%
2020	Attorney General	Rokita 66% - 34%
2022	Senate	Young 63% - 31%
2022	Treasurer	Elliott 68% - 32%
2022	Auditor	Klutz 66% - 30%
2022	Secretary of State	Morales 58% - 34%
2024	President	Trump 64% - 34%
2024	Senate	Banks 64% - 33%
2024	Governor	Braun 58% - 36%
2024	Attorney General	Rokita 64% - 36%

== List of members representing the district ==
Member	Party	Years	Cong ress	Electoral history
District created March 4, 1833
Amos Lane (Lawrenceburg)	Jacksonian	March 4, 1833 – March 3, 1837	23rd 24th	Elected in 1833. Re-elected in 1835. Lost re-election.
George H. Dunn (Lawrenceburg)	Whig	March 4, 1837 – March 3, 1839	25th	Elected in 1837. Lost re-election.
Thomas Smith (Versailles)	Democratic	March 4, 1839 – March 3, 1841	26th	Elected in 1839. Lost re-election.
James H. Cravens (Marion)	Whig	March 4, 1841 – March 3, 1843	27th	Elected in 1841. Retired.
Caleb B. Smith (Connersville)	Whig	March 4, 1843 – March 3, 1849	28th 29th 30th	Elected in 1843. Re-elected in 1845. Re-elected in 1847. Retired.
George Julian (Centerville)	Free Soil	March 4, 1849 – March 3, 1851	31st	Elected in 1849. Lost re-election.
Samuel W. Parker (Connersville)	Whig	March 4, 1851 – March 3, 1853	32nd	Elected in 1851. Redistricted to the 5th district.
James H. Lane (Lawrenceburg)	Democratic	March 4, 1853 – March 3, 1855	33rd	Elected in 1852. Retired.
William Cumback (Greensburg)	People's	March 4, 1855 – March 3, 1857	34th	Elected in 1854. Lost re-election as a Republican.
James B. Foley (Greensburg)	Democratic	March 4, 1857 – March 3, 1859	35th	Elected in 1856. Retired.
William S. Holman (Aurora)	Democratic	March 4, 1859 – March 3, 1865	36th 37th 38th	Elected in 1858. Re-elected in 1860. Re-elected in 1862. Retired.
John H. Farquhar (Brookville)	Republican	March 4, 1865 – March 3, 1867	39th	Elected in 1864. Retired.
William S. Holman (Aurora)	Democratic	March 4, 1867 – March 3, 1869	40th	Elected in 1866. Redistricted to the 3rd district.
George W. Julian (Centerville)	Republican	March 4, 1869 – March 3, 1871	41st	Redistricted from the 5th district and re-elected in 1868. Lost renomination.
Jeremiah M. Wilson (Connersville)	Republican	March 4, 1871 – March 3, 1875	42nd 43rd	Elected in 1870. Re-elected in 1872. Retired.
Jeptha D. New (Vernon)	Democratic	March 4, 1875 – March 3, 1877	44th	Elected in 1874. Retired.
Leonidas Sexton (Rushville)	Republican	March 4, 1877 – March 3, 1879	45th	Elected in 1876. Lost re-election.
Jeptha D. New (Vernon)	Democratic	March 4, 1879 – March 3, 1881	46th	Elected in 1878. Retired.
William S. Holman (Aurora)	Democratic	March 4, 1881 – March 3, 1895	47th 48th 49th 50th 51st 52nd 53rd	Elected in 1880. Re-elected in 1882. Re-elected in 1884. Re-elected in 1886. Re-elected in 1888. Re-elected in 1890. Re-elected in 1892. Lost re-election.
James E. Watson (Rushville)	Republican	March 4, 1895 – March 3, 1897	54th	Elected in 1894. Retired.
William S. Holman (Aurora)	Democratic	March 4, 1897 – April 22, 1897	55th	Elected in 1896. Died.
Vacant		April 22, 1897 – December 6, 1897	55th	
Francis M. Griffith (Vevay)	Democratic	December 6, 1897 – March 3, 1905	55th 56th 57th 58th	Elected to finish Holman's term. Re-elected in 1898. Re-elected in 1900. Re-elected in 1902. Retired.
Lincoln Dixon (North Vernon)	Democratic	March 4, 1905 – March 3, 1919	59th 60th 61st 62nd 63rd 64th 65th	Elected in 1904. Re-elected in 1906. Re-elected in 1908. Re-elected in 1910. Re-elected in 1912. Re-elected in 1914. Re-elected in 1916. Lost re-election.
John S. Benham (Benham)	Republican	March 4, 1919 – March 3, 1923	66th 67th	Elected in 1918. Re-elected in 1920. Lost re-election.
Harry C. Canfield (Batesville)	Democratic	March 4, 1923 – March 3, 1933	68th 69th 70th 71st 72nd	Elected in 1922. Re-elected in 1924. Re-elected in 1926. Re-elected in 1928. Re-elected in 1930. Lost renomination.
James I. Farley (Auburn)	Democratic	March 4, 1933 – January 3, 1939	73rd 74th 75th	Elected in 1932. Re-elected in 1934. Re-elected in 1936. Lost re-election.
George W. Gillie (Fort Wayne)	Republican	January 3, 1939 – January 3, 1949	76th 77th 78th 79th 80th	Elected in 1938. Re-elected in 1940. Re-elected in 1942. Re-elected in 1944. Re-elected in 1946. Lost re-election.
Edward H. Kruse (Fort Wayne)	Democratic	January 3, 1949 – January 3, 1951	81st	Elected in 1948. Lost re-election.
E. Ross Adair (Fort Wayne)	Republican	January 3, 1951 – January 3, 1971	82nd 83rd 84th 85th 86th 87th 88th 89th 90th 91st	Elected in 1950. Re-elected in 1952. Re-elected in 1954. Re-elected in 1956. Re-elected in 1958. Re-elected in 1960. Re-elected in 1962. Re-elected in 1964. Re-elected in 1966. Re-elected in 1968. Lost re-election.
J. Edward Roush (Huntington)	Democratic	January 3, 1971 – January 3, 1977	92nd 93rd 94th	Elected in 1970. Re-elected in 1972. Re-elected in 1974. Lost re-election.
Dan Quayle (Huntington)	Republican	January 3, 1977 – January 3, 1981	95th 96th	Elected in 1976. Re-elected in 1978. Retired to run for U.S. senator.
Dan Coats (Fort Wayne)	Republican	January 3, 1981 – January 3, 1989	97th 98th 99th 100th	Elected in 1980. Re-elected in 1982. Re-elected in 1984. Re-elected in 1986. Re-elected in 1988. Resigned when appointed U.S. senator.
Vacant		January 3, 1989 – March 28, 1989		
Jill Long (Larwill)	Democratic	March 28, 1989 – January 3, 1995	101st 102nd 103rd	Elected to finish Coats's term. Re-elected in 1990. Re-elected in 1992; Lost re-election.
Mark Souder (Fort Wayne)	Republican	January 3, 1995 – January 3, 2003	104th 105th 106th 107th	Elected in 1994. Re-elected in 1996. Re-elected in 1998. Re-elected in 2000. Redistricted to the 3rd district.
Steve Buyer (Monticello)	Republican	January 3, 2003 – January 3, 2011	108th 109th 110th 111th	Redistricted from the 5th district and re-elected in 2002. Re-elected in 2004. Re-elected in 2006. Re-elected in 2008. Retired.
Todd Rokita (Clermont)	Republican	January 3, 2011 – January 3, 2019	112th 113th 114th 115th	Elected in 2010. Re-elected in 2012. Re-elected in 2014. Re-elected in 2016. Retired to run for U.S. senator.
Jim Baird (Greencastle)	Republican	January 3, 2019 – present	116th 117th 118th 119th	Elected in 2018. Re-elected in 2020. Re-elected in 2022. Re-elected in 2024. Re-elected in 2026.

== Election results ==
=== 2002 ===
Indiana's 4th Congressional District election (2002)
Party	Candidate	Votes	%
Republican	Steve Buyer	112,760	71.36
Democratic	William A. "Big Bill" Abbott	41,314	26.15
Libertarian	Jerry L. Susong	3,934	2.49
Total votes		158,008	100.00
Turnout			
Republican hold			

=== 2004 ===
Indiana's 4th Congressional District election (2004)
Party	Candidate	Votes	%
Republican	Steve Buyer*	190,445	69.47
Democratic	David Sanders	77,574	28.30
Libertarian	Kevin R. Fleming	6,119	2.23
Total votes		274,138	100.00
Turnout			
Republican hold			

=== 2006 ===
Indiana's 4th Congressional District election (2006)
Party	Candidate	Votes	%
Republican	Steve Buyer*	111,057	62.38
Democratic	David Sanders	66,986	37.62
Total votes		178,043	100.00
Turnout			
Republican hold			

=== 2008 ===
Indiana's 4th Congressional District election (2008)
Party	Candidate	Votes	%
Republican	Steve Buyer*	192,526	59.87
Democratic	Nels J. Ackerson	129,038	40.13
Total votes		321,564	100.00
Turnout			
Republican hold			

=== 2010 ===
Indiana's 4th Congressional District election (2010)
Party	Candidate	Votes	%
Republican	Todd Rokita	138,732	68.57
Democratic	David Sanders	53,167	26.28
Libertarian	John Duncan	10,423	5.15
Total votes		202,322	100.00
Turnout			
Republican hold			

=== 2012 ===
Indiana's 4th Congressional District election (2012)
Party	Candidate	Votes	%
Republican	Todd Rokita*	168,688	61.96
Democratic	Tara Nelson	93,015	34.16
Libertarian	Benjamin Gehlhausen	10,565	3.88
Total votes		272,268	100.00
Turnout			
Republican hold			

=== 2014 ===
Indiana's 4th Congressional District election (2014)
Party	Candidate	Votes	%
Republican	Todd Rokita*	94,998	66.87
Democratic	John Dale	47,056	33.13
Total votes		142,054	100.00
Turnout			31
Republican hold			

=== 2016 ===
Indiana's 4th Congressional District election (2016)
Party	Candidate	Votes	%
Republican	Todd Rokita*	193,412	64.59
Democratic	John Dale	91,256	30.48
Libertarian	Steven Mayoras	14,766	4.9
Total votes		299,434	100.00
Turnout			62
Republican hold			

=== 2018 ===
Indiana's 4th Congressional District election (2018)
Party	Candidate	Votes	%
Republican	Jim Baird	156,539	64.1
Democratic	Tobi Beck	87,824	35.9
Total votes		244,363	100.0
Republican hold			

=== 2020 ===
Indiana's 4th congressional district, 2020
Party	Candidate	Votes	%
Republican	Jim Baird*	225,531	66.6
Democratic	Joe Mackey	112,984	33.4
Total votes		338,515	100.0
Republican hold			

=== 2022 ===
Indiana's 4th congressional district, 2022
Party	Candidate	Votes	%
Republican	Jim Baird*	134,442	68.2
Democratic	Roger Day	62,668	31.8
Total votes		197,110	100.0
Republican hold			

=== 2024 ===
Indiana's 4th congressional district, 2024
Party	Candidate	Votes	%
Republican	Jim Baird*	209,794	64.80
Democratic	Derrick Holder	100,091	30.90
Libertarian	Ashley Groff	13,710	4.20
Total votes		323,595	100.0
Republican hold			

== Historical district boundaries ==
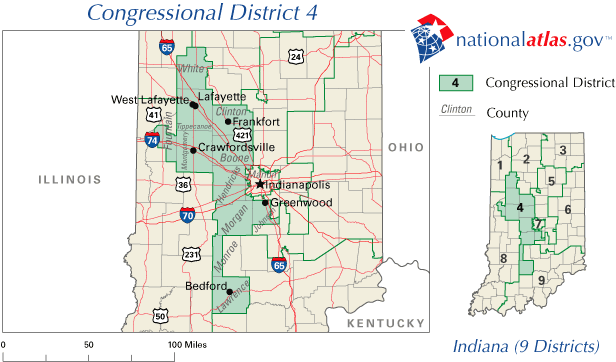
2003–2013

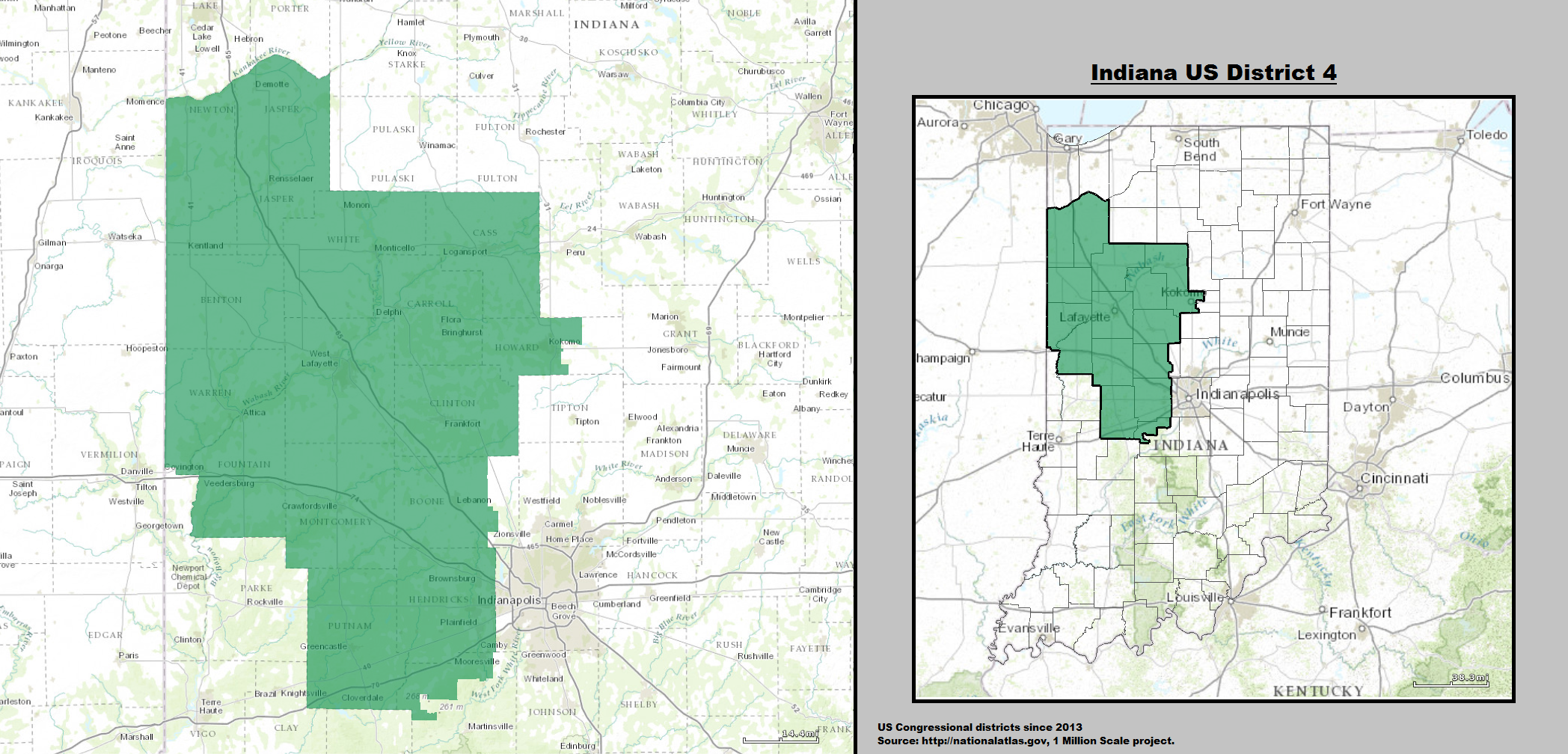
2013–2023

== See also ==
- Indiana's congressional districts
- List of United States congressional districts
