= IN-7 =

IN-7, IN 7, or IN7 may refer to:

- Indiana's 7th congressional district
- Indiana State Road 7
