= Newe =

Newe is a surname. Notable people with the surname include:

- Paul Newe (born 1964), Irish footballer
- Tom Newe (Born 1967), Irish Academic - Professor at University of Limerick
- G. B. Newe (1907–1982), Northern Irish politician
- Gerard Newe (1908–1982), Northern Irish politician

== See also ==
- Western Shoshone
- Castle Newe
- New (surname)
