= John S. Benham =

American politician

John Benham
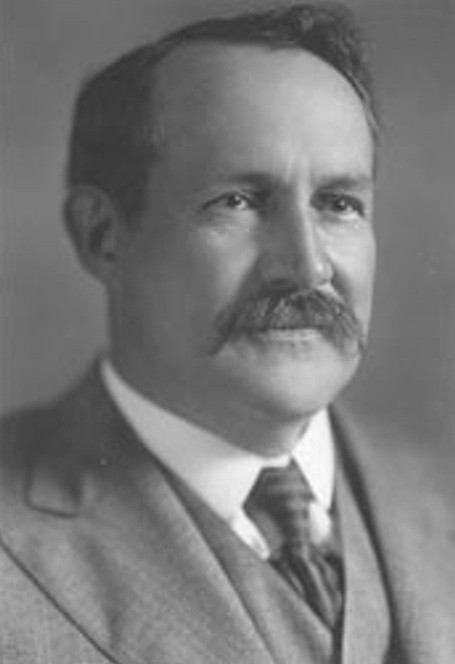
- Benham in 1923

Member of the U.S. House of Representatives from Indiana's 4th district
- In office March 4, 1919 – March 3, 1923
- Preceded by: Lincoln Dixon
- Succeeded by: Harry C. Canfield

Personal details
- Born: October 24, 1863 Benham, Indiana, U.S.
- Died: December 11, 1935 (aged 72) Batesville, Indiana, U.S
- Party: Republican
- Education: Indiana State University; Indiana University

John Samuel Benham (October 24, 1863 – December 11, 1935) was an American educator and politician who served two terms as a U.S. representative from Indiana from 1919 to 1923.

== Biography ==
Born on a farm near Benham, Indiana, Benham attended public schools, a business college in Delaware, Ohio, and a normal school in Brookville, Indiana. He taught school in the winter and attended college in the summer, being engaged as a teacher in various places in Indiana from 1882 to 1907. He graduated from Indiana State University in Terre Haute, Indiana, in 1893 and from Indiana University at Bloomington, Indiana, in 1903. He specialized in history at the University of Chicago for several terms. He became the superintendent of schools for Ripley County for fourteen years. He returned to Benham, Indiana, in 1907 and engaged in the timber, milling, contracting business, and followed agricultural pursuits. He served as a delegate to the Republican National Convention in 1916.

=== Congress ===
Benham was elected as a Republican to the Sixty-sixth and Sixty-seventh Congresses (March 4, 1919 – March 3, 1923). He served as chairman of the Committee on Expenditures on Public Buildings (Sixty-seventh Congress). He was an unsuccessful candidate for reelection in 1922 to the Sixty-eighth Congress.

=== Later career and death ===
He moved to Batesville, Indiana, in 1923 and engaged as a building contractor. He was again the superintendent of schools for Ripley County, Indiana from 1924 to 1929. He retired from active business pursuits in 1931 and resided in Batesville, Indiana, until his death there on December 11, 1935. He was interred in Benham Church Cemetery, near Benham, Indiana.

U.S. House of Representatives
Preceded by Lincoln Dixon	Member of the U.S. House of Representatives from Indiana's 4th congressional district 1919-1923	Succeeded by Harry C. Canfield
