= Robert A. New =

American politician

1st Secretary of State of Indiana
- In office November 7, 1816 – December 6, 1825
- Governor: Jonathan Jennings, Ratliff Boon, William Hendricks, James B. Ray
- Preceded by: John Gibson (as Territorial Secretary of State)
- Succeeded by: William W. Wick

Robert Allen New (1789 – June 20, 1856) was an American soldier and politician who served as the 1st non-Territorial Secretary of State of Indiana from November 7, 1816, to December 6, 1825.

== Biography ==
=== Early life ===
Robert New's father was Jethro New, a Continental Army soldier from Delaware who moved first to North Carolina and then to Owen County, Kentucky, near New Liberty, in 1794. Robert was one of his thirteen children. Jethro New's descendants formed one of Indiana's most prominent political dynasties.

Robert New was the uncle of John C. New (Treasurer of the United States under Ulysses S. Grant, son of John Bowman New) and Jeptha D. New (U.S. Representative from Indiana, son of Hickman New), and he was the great-uncle of Harry Stewart New (U.S. Senator from Indiana and U.S. Postmaster General under Warren Harding and Calvin Coolidge, son of John C. New). The News were a Primitive Baptist family.

The News left Kentucky and resettled in Indiana. Robert New joined the Indiana Militia and attained the rank of captain in 1814. In 1815, New became aide-de-camp to Thomas Posey, the Governor of Indiana Territory.

=== Political career ===
In 1816, when Indiana attained statehood, New was elected the first Secretary of State of Indiana by the newly-formed Indiana General Assembly, defeating the other contender for the position, Alexander Holton, by a vote of twenty-three to eleven. New was a Democratic-Republican. He served in the administrations of Governors Jonathan Jennings, Ratliff Boon, William Hendricks, and James B. Ray. New succeeded Territorial Secretary of State John Gibson. New was succeeded to the office of Secretary of State in December 1825 by William W. Wick.

=== Personal life and death ===
In 1819, while serving as Secretary of State, New founded Corydon Seminary with local newspaper editor, R. W. Nelson. The seminary taught Greek, Latin, and mathematics. In 1821, New moved with the rest of his family to Vernon.

New was an associate and ally of Davis Floyd, a politician who was involved with the Burr conspiracy and the Indiana Canal Company.

New died in 1856. He is buried at Hebron Cemetery in Monroe Township, Jefferson County.

Political offices
Preceded by John Gibson	Secretary of State of Indiana; 1816-1825	Succeeded by William W. Wick
