= Kovo =

Kovo or KOVO may refer to:

- KOVO, a radio station licensed to Provo, Utah, United States
- Korea Volleyball Federation
- Isaac Kovo (1770–1854), rabbi in Ottoman Palestine
- North Vernon Airport, in Jennings County, Indiana, United States
