= James I. Farley =

American politician

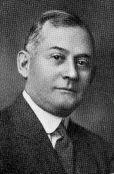

Member of the U.S. House of Representatives from Indiana's 4th district
- In office March 4, 1933 – January 3, 1939
- Preceded by: Harry C. Canfield
- Succeeded by: George W. Gillie

Personal details
- Born: James Indus Farley; February 24, 1871 Hamilton, Indiana, U.S.
- Died: June 16, 1948 (aged 77) Bryn Mawr, Pennsylvania, U.S.
- Resting place: Woodlawn Cemetery, Auburn, Indiana
- Party: Democratic
- Spouse: Lotta M. Gramling

James Indus Farley (February 24, 1871 – June 16, 1948) was an American educator, businessman, and a three-term member of the United States Congress from Indiana from 1933 to 1939.

== Biography ==
Born on a farm near Hamilton, Indiana, he attended Tri-State College in nearby Angola, and Simpson College in Indianola, Iowa. After four years of teaching school, he went to work for the Auburn Automobile Company and rose to become the company's president.

== Political career ==
In 1928, he entered politics as a delegate to the Democratic National Convention.

=== Congress ===
He was elected to Congress in 1932 from the Fourth District, defeating incumbent Republican Harry Canfield. He was re-elected twice before losing to Republican George W. Gillie in 1938.

== Death ==
He died in Bryn Mawr, Pennsylvania on June 16, 1948, and is buried in Woodlawn Cemetery, Auburn, Indiana.

U.S. House of Representatives
Preceded by Harry C. Canfield	Member of the U.S. House of Representatives from Indiana's 4th congressional district 1933-1939	Succeeded by George W. Gillie
