= Leonidas Sexton =

American politician (1827–1880)

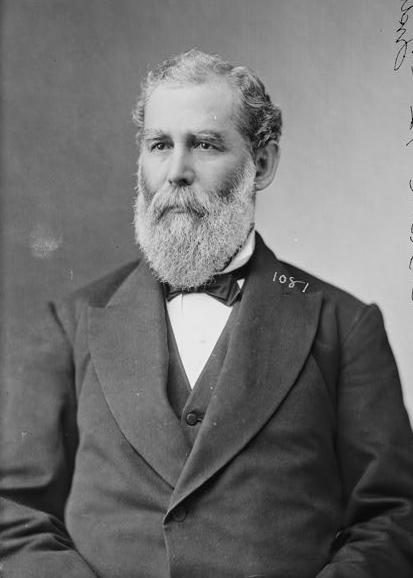

Member of the U.S. House of Representatives from Indiana's 4th district
- In office March 4, 1877 – March 3, 1879
- Preceded by: Jeptha D. New
- Succeeded by: Jeptha D. New

17th Lieutenant Governor of Indiana
- In office January 13, 1873 – January 13, 1877
- Governor: Thomas A. Hendricks; James D. Williams
- Preceded by: William Cumback
- Succeeded by: Isaac P. Gray

Member of the Indiana House of Representatives from the ? district
- In office 1856–1856

Personal details
- Born: May 19, 1827 Rushville, Indiana, U.S.
- Died: July 4, 1880 (aged 53) Parsons, Kansas, U.S.
- Party: Republican
- Education: Jefferson College; Cincinnati Law School

Leonidas Sexton (May 19, 1827 – July 4, 1880) was an American lawyer and politician who served one term as a U.S. representative from Indiana from 1877 to 1879. He previously served as Lieutenant Governor of Indiana from 1873 to 1877.

== Biography ==
Born in Rushville, Indiana, Sexton attended the public schools of his native county and was graduated from Jefferson College (now Washington & Jefferson College), Canonsburg, Pennsylvania, in 1847. He studied law in Rushville and in 1848 and 1849 attended the Cincinnati Law School. He was admitted to the Indiana bar in 1850 and commenced the practice of his profession in Rushville, Indiana.

=== Political career ===
He served as member of the State house of representatives in 1856.

Sexton was elected the 17th Lieutenant Governor of Indiana and served from January 1873 to January 1877.

Sexton was elected as a Republican to the Forty-fifth Congress (March 4, 1877 – March 3, 1879). He was an unsuccessful candidate for reelection in 1878 to the Forty-sixth Congress.

=== Death ===
He died in Parsons, Kansas, July 4, 1880. He was interred in East Hill Cemetery, Rushville, Indiana.

Political offices
Preceded by William Cumback	Lieutenant Governor of Indiana; 1873–1877	Succeeded by Isaac P. Gray
U.S. House of Representatives
Preceded by Jeptha D. New	Member of the U.S. House of Representatives from Indiana's 4th congressional district 1877–1879	Succeeded by Jeptha D. New
