= Lincoln Dixon =

American politician (1860–1932)

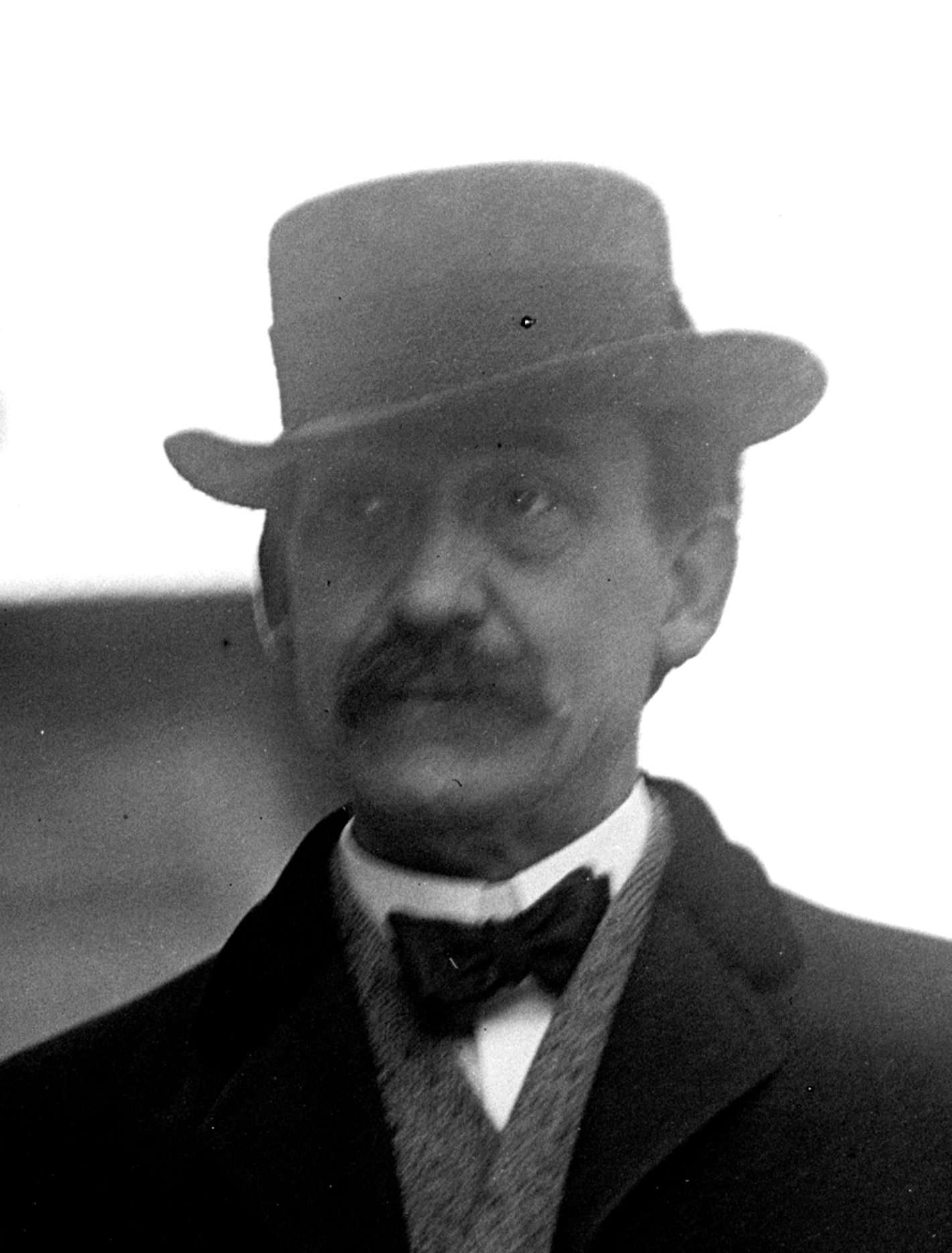
- Dixon in 1911

Member of the U.S. House of Representatives from Indiana's 4th district
- In office 1905–1919
- Preceded by: Francis M. Griffith
- Succeeded by: John S. Benham

Personal details
- Born: February 9, 1860 Vernon, Indiana, U.S.
- Died: September 16, 1932 (aged 72) Lyndon, Kentucky, U.S.
- Resting place: Vernon Cemetery, Vernon, Indiana, U.S.
- Party: Democratic

Lincoln Dixon (February 9, 1860 – September 16, 1932) was an American lawyer and politician who served seven terms as a U.S. representative from Indiana from 1905 to 1919.

== Biography ==
Born in Vernon, Indiana, Dixon attended Vernon Academy, and graduated from Indiana University Bloomington with honor in 1880. He was employed as a clerk in the Department of the Interior at Washington, D.C., in 1881. He returned to Vernon and studied law. He was admitted to the bar in 1882 and commenced practice in North Vernon. Reading clerk of the State House of Representatives in 1883. He served as prosecuting attorney for the sixth judicial circuit 1884–1892. He served as a member of the Democratic State committee 1897–1904 and 1920–1927.

=== Congress ===
Dixon was elected as a Democrat to the Fifty-ninth and to the six succeeding Congresses (March 4, 1905 – March 3, 1919). He was an unsuccessful candidate for reelection in 1918 to the Sixty-sixth Congress.

=== Later career and death ===
He resumed the practice of law. He served as a delegate to the Democratic National Conventions in 1920 and 1924. In charge of the Democratic campaign in the West in 1924. He was appointed a member of the United States Tariff Commission by President Calvin Coolidge in 1927 and retired in 1930. He was reappointed by President Herbert Hoover on June 17, 1931, and served until his death, while on a visit, in Lyndon, Kentucky on September 16, 1932.

He was interred in Vernon Cemetery, Vernon.

U.S. House of Representatives
Preceded by Francis M. Griffith	Member of the U.S. House of Representatives from Indiana's 4th congressional district 1905-1919	Succeeded by John S. Benham
