= Francis M. Griffith =

American politician

Francis Griffith
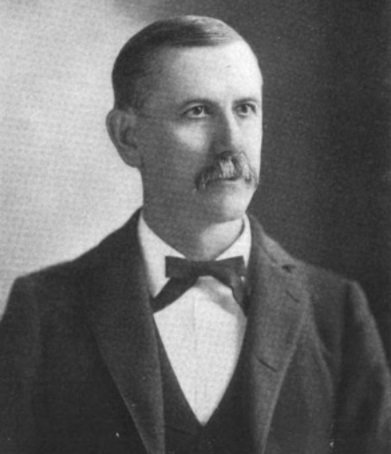

Member of the U.S. House of Representatives from Indiana's 4th district
- In office December 6, 1897 – March 3, 1905
- Preceded by: William S. Holman
- Succeeded by: Lincoln Dixon

Personal details
- Born: Francis Marion Griffith; August 21, 1849 Moorefield, Indiana, U.S.
- Died: February 8, 1927 (aged 77) Vevay, Indiana, U.S
- Resting place: Vevay Cemetery
- Party: Democratic
- Education: Franklin College

Francis Marion Griffith (August 21, 1849 – February 8, 1927) was an American educator and politician who served four terms as a U.S. representative from Indiana from 1897 to 1905.

== Biography ==
Born in Moorefield, Indiana, Griffith attended the country schools of the county, the high school in Vevay, Indiana, and Franklin College, Franklin, Indiana. He taught school. He was appointed school superintendent of Switzerland County in 1873. He studied law.

=== Early career ===
He was admitted to the bar in 1875 and commenced practice in Vevay. County treasurer from 1875 to 1877. He served as delegate to the Democratic National Convention in 1880. He served as member of the State senate from 1886 to 1894 and served as Acting Lieutenant Governor from 1891 to 1894. He was an unsuccessful candidate for attorney general of Indiana in 1894.

=== Congress ===
Griffith was elected as a Democrat to the Fifty-fifth Congress to fill the vacancy caused by the death of William S. Holman. He was reelected to the Fifty-sixth, Fifty-seventh, and Fifty-eighth Congresses and served from December 6, 1897, to March 3, 1905. He declined to be a candidate for renomination in 1904.

=== Later career and death ===
He resumed the practice of law in Vevay, Indiana. City attorney 1912–1916. He served as judge of the circuit court of the fifth judicial district 1916–1922. He again engaged in the practice of his profession.

He died in Vevay, Indiana, February 8, 1927. He was interred in Vevay Cemetery.

Political offices
| Preceded by Ira Joy Chase; Governor | Acting Lieutenant Governor of Indiana; 1891–1893 | Succeeded by Mortimer Nye; Governor |
U.S. House of Representatives
| Preceded by Vacant | Member of the U.S. House of Representatives from Indiana's 4th congressional district December 6, 1897 - March 3, 1905 | Succeeded by Lincoln Dixon |
