= Jethro New =

American frontiersman and Continental Army soldier

- Born: September 20, 1757; Kent County, Delaware Colony
- Died: 1825; Vernon, Indiana, United States
- Known for: Kentucky and Indiana frontiersman; soldier in the Continental Army.
- Spouse: Sarah Bowman
- Children: 12 children
- Parent(s): Robert A. New and Mary Crumpton

Jethro New (September 20, 1757 – 1825) was an 18th-century American frontiersman and Continental Army soldier during the American Revolutionary War. He was a prominent settler in North Carolina and Kentucky as well as Jennings County, Indiana.

Of his twelve children, his son Hickman New was a minister of the Disciples of Christ and his son Robert A. New was the first Indiana Secretary of State following Indiana's admission into the U.S. His son, John Bowman New, was the father of John C. New, Treasurer of the United States from 1875 to 1876. His youngest son Jeptha D. New served for one term in the U.S. House of Representatives, where he represented Indiana.

== Biography ==
Born in Kent County, Delaware, he enlisted in the Continental Army during the American Revolutionary War. Serving under Captain Rhodes in the 2nd Delaware Regiment, he saw action at the Battle of Cowpens, and the Siege of Yorktown.

Following the war, he married Sarah Bowman and together had 12 children. His wife Sarah died in 1813. Jethro and his family moved from Gallatin County, Kentucky to Owen County, Kentucky in 1821 and on to Vernon, Jennings, Indiana in 1823. Jethro New died there in 1825 and was buried in the lower part of Vernon Cemetery.
