= Harry C. Canfield =

American politician

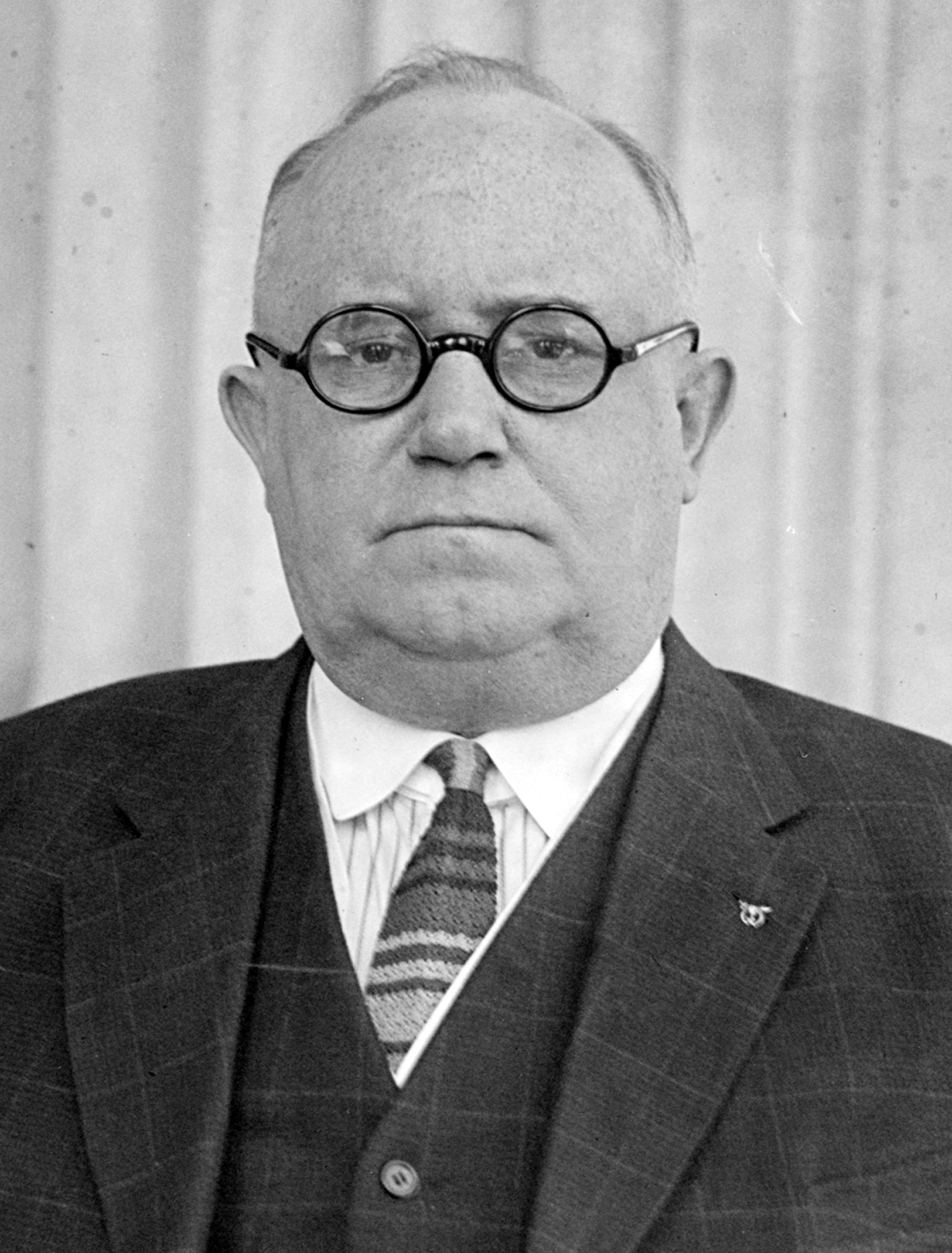

Member of the U.S. House of Representatives from Indiana's 4th district
- In office March 4, 1923 – March 3, 1933
- Preceded by: John S. Benham
- Succeeded by: James I. Farley

Personal details
- Born: Harry Clifford Canfield; November 22, 1875 Moores Hill, Indiana
- Died: February 9, 1945 (aged 69) Batesville, Indiana
- Resting place: First Methodist Episcopal Cemetery
- Party: Democratic

Harry Clifford Canfield (November 22, 1875 – February 9, 1945) was an American educator, businessman, and politician who served five terms as a U.S. representative from Indiana from 1923 to 1933.

== Early life and career ==
Born near Moores Hill, Indiana, Canfield attended the public schools, Moores Hill College, Central Normal College, Danville, Indiana, and Vorhies Business College, Indianapolis, Indiana. He taught school in Dearborn County 1896–1898. He moved to Batesville, Ripley County, in 1899 and engaged in the manufacture of furniture. He was also interested in the jobbing of furniture, and in farming and banking.

=== Congress ===
Canfield was elected as a Democrat to the Sixty-eighth and to the four succeeding Congresses (March 4, 1923 – March 3, 1933). He was an unsuccessful candidate for renomination in 1932.

=== Later career and death ===
He resumed the furniture manufacturing business in Batesville, Indiana, where he died February 9, 1945. He was interred in the First Methodist Episcopal Cemetery.

U.S. House of Representatives
Preceded by John S. Benham	Member of the U.S. House of Representatives from Indiana's 4th congressional district 1923-1933	Succeeded by James I. Farley
