= Jeptha D. New =

American politician

Jeptha New
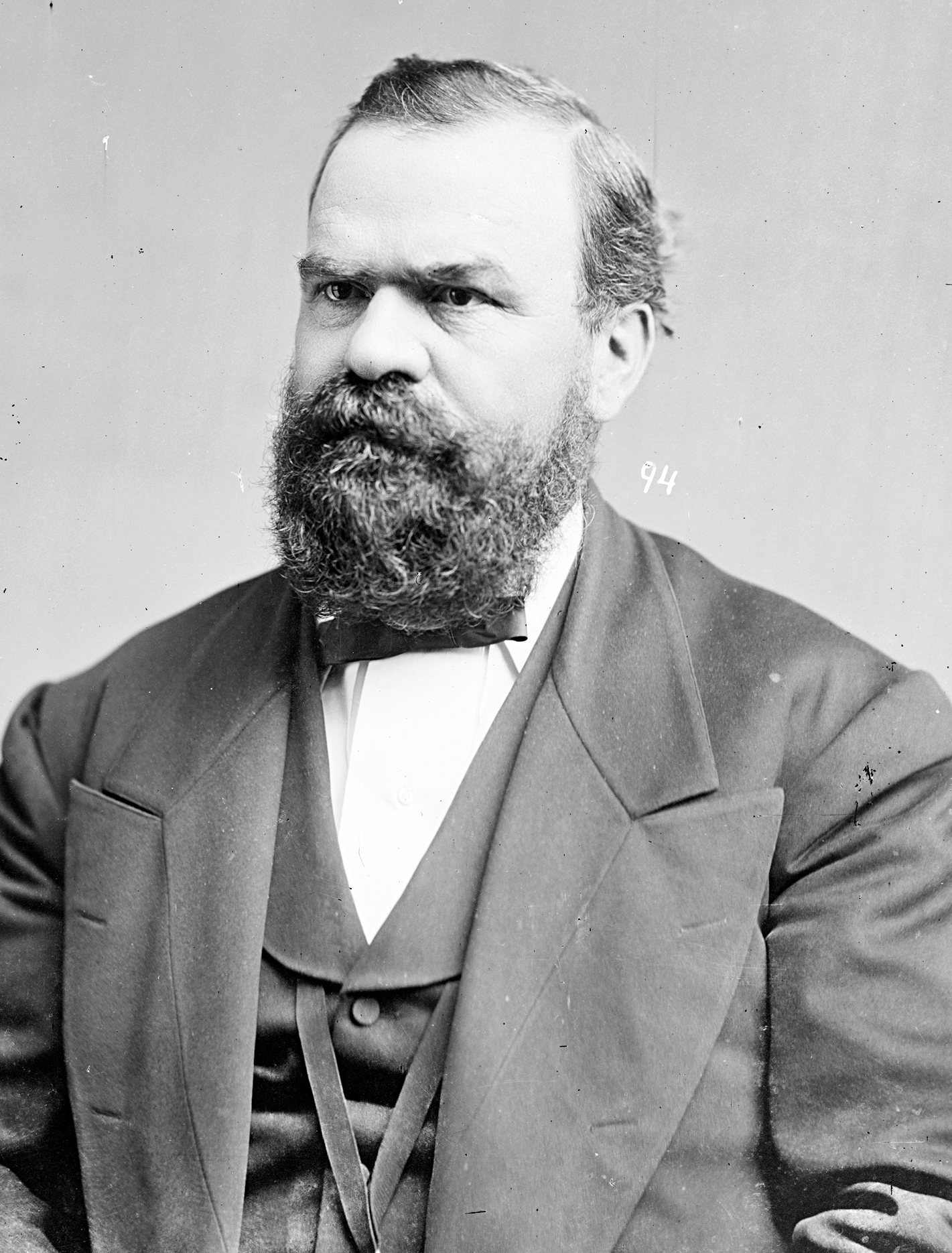

Member of the U.S. House of Representatives from Indiana's 4th district
- In office March 4, 1879 – March 3, 1881
- Preceded by: Leonidas Sexton
- Succeeded by: William S. Holman

Member of the U.S. House of Representatives from Indiana's 4th district
- In office March 4, 1875 – March 3, 1877
- Preceded by: Jeremiah M. Wilson
- Succeeded by: Leonidas Sexton

Personal details
- Born: November 28, 1830 Vernon, Indiana, U.S.
- Died: July 9, 1892 (aged 61) Vernon, Indiana, U.S.
- Party: Democratic
- Relatives: John C. New (brother); Jethro New (grandfather); Robert A. New (uncle); Harry S. New (nephew)
- Education: Bethany College

Jeptha Dudley New (November 28, 1830 – July 9, 1892) was a U.S. representative from Indiana. He was the grandson of Jethro New, nephew of Robert A. New, brother of John C. New, and uncle of Harry Stewart New.

Born in Vernon, Indiana, New was graduated from Vernon (Indiana) Academy and Bethany College in West Virginia where he studied law. He was admitted to the bar in 1851 and practiced in Vernon, Indiana, until 1864. One of his law partners was Thomas W. Woollen, who would later become Indiana Attorney General. New served as mayor of Vernon 1852–1854. He served as prosecuting attorney of Jennings County, Indiana, from 1860 to 1864. He served as judge of the district court of common pleas 1864–1868. He resumed the practice of law in Vernon.

New was elected as a Democrat to the Forty-fourth Congress (March 4, 1875 – March 3, 1877). He declined to be a candidate for reelection in 1876 to the Forty-fifth Congress.

New was elected to the Forty-sixth Congress (March 4, 1879 – March 3, 1881). He was not a candidate for reelection in 1880. He served as judge of the sixth judicial circuit of Indiana 1882–1888. Appellate judge in 1891. He was nominated by the Democratic Party as a candidate for judge of the supreme court of Indiana in 1892, but died before the election in Vernon, Indiana, July 9, 1892. He was interred in Vernon Cemetery.

U.S. House of Representatives
Preceded by Jeremiah M. Wilson	Member of the U.S. House of Representatives from Indiana's 4th congressional district 1875-1877	Succeeded by Leonidas Sexton
Preceded by Leonidas Sexton	Member of the U.S. House of Representatives from Indiana's 4th congressional district 1879-1881	Succeeded by William S. Holman
