= Jeremiah M. Wilson =

American politician (1828–1901)

Jeremiah Morrow Wilson
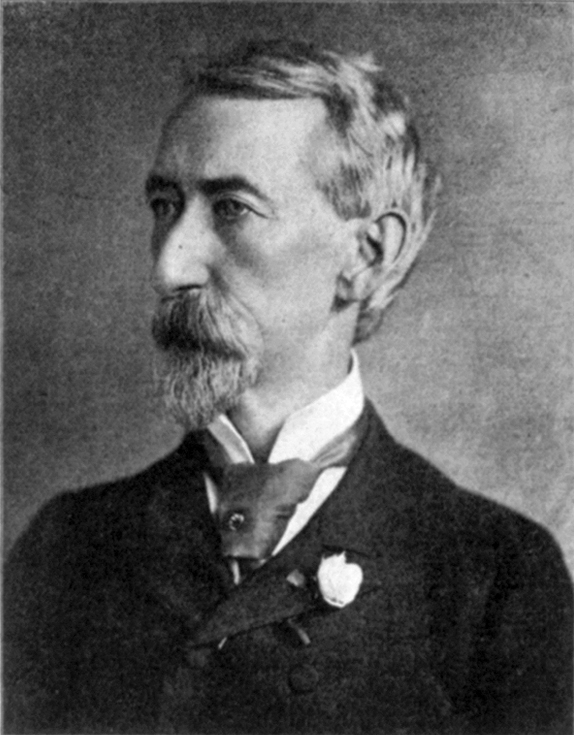
- Jeremiah Morrow Wilson

Member of the U.S. House of Representatives from Indiana's 4th district
- In office March 4, 1871 – March 3, 1875
- Preceded by: George W. Julian
- Succeeded by: Jeptha D. New

Dean of Georgetown University Law Center
- In office 1896–1900
- Preceded by: Martin F. Morris
- Succeeded by: George Hamilton

Personal details
- Born: November 25, 1828 Lebanon, Ohio, U.S.
- Died: September 24, 1901 (aged 72)
- Resting place: Rock Creek Cemetery; Washington, D.C., U.S.
- Party: Republican

Jeremiah Morrow Wilson (November 25, 1828 – September 24, 1901) was an American educator, lawyer, jurist, and politician who served two terms as a U.S. representative from Indiana from 1871 to 1875.

== Biography ==
Born near Lebanon, Ohio, Wilson completed preparatory studies. He studied law. He was admitted to the bar and practiced. He moved to Indiana and settled in Connersville and continued the practice of law. He served as judge of the court of common pleas of Fayette County, Indiana, from 1860 to 1865.

Wilson was elected judge of the circuit court in October 1865 and served until his election to Congress.

=== Congress ===
Wilson was elected as a Republican to the Forty-second and Forty-third Congresses (March 4, 1871 – March 3, 1875).

While in Congress, Wilson was chairman of the special committee of the House of Representatives to investigate the District of Columbia board of public works. This investigation was held in 1874 and lasted four months. During its progress, Wilson often acted more as a prosecutor than a committee chairman. In the end, the committee's finding resulted in changed the form of the District of Columbia's government from that of a territory to one under control of three commissioners.

At the end of his second term, he declined renomination to pursue private law practice in Washington, D.C., establishing a practice with Samuel Shallabarger until the latter's death in 1896. During this time, he also taught at the Law School of Georgetown University and served as the school's dean. Prior to his death, Wilson's law partners were his son, Charles S. Wilson, and Adolph A. Hoehling, Jr.

During his long practice of the law, Wilson was connected with many famous cases, gaining reputation as a criminal lawyer. One of his most famous cases involved serving as counsel for Henry W. Howgate when he was tried in 1894. That same year, he successfully prosecuted congressman W. C. P. Breckinridge for Breach of Promise for failing to honor his pledge to marry his client, Madeleine V. Pollard. At the time of his death, Wilson was president of the Chesapeake and Potomac Telephone Company, a director in the National Fidelity and Deposit Company and also of other corporations of the District. He was a member of the Metropolitan Club and of the District of Columbia Bar.

=== Death ===
Wilson died on September 24, 1901, and was interred next to his wife in Rock Creek Cemetery.

== Family ==
Surviving at the time of Wilson's death were a son, Charles S. Wilson, and a daughter, Anna Wilson Haywood. Wilson's wife, Mary H. S. Wilson, died in 1900.

U.S. House of Representatives
Preceded by George W. Julian	Member of the U.S. House of Representatives from Indiana's 4th congressional district 1871-1875	Succeeded by Jeptha D. New
