= Vernon Historic District =

Historic district in Indiana, United States

- U.S. National Register of Historic Places
- U.S. Historic district
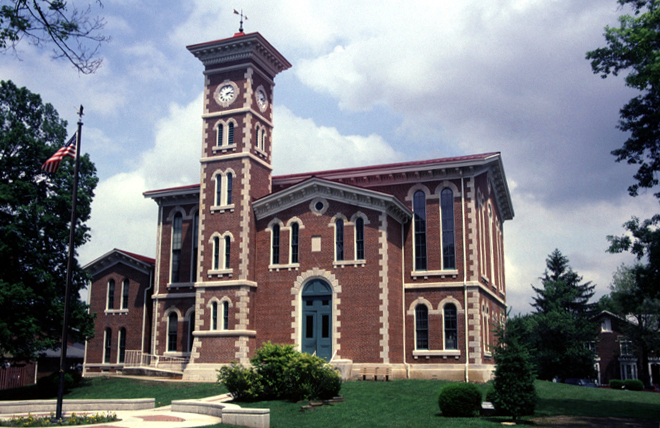
- Jennings County Indiana, June 2001

- Location within Indiana Location within the United States
- Nearest city: 1 mile south of North Vernon on State Roads State Road 3 and State Road 7, in Vernon and Vernon Township, Jennings County, Indiana
- Coordinates: 38°58′58″N 85°36′41″W
- Area: 386 acres (156 ha)
- Architectural style: Mid 19th Century Revival, Federal
- NRHP reference No.: 76000024
- Added to NRHP: August 27, 1976

Vernon Historic District is a national historic district located in Vernon and Vernon Township, Jennings County, Indiana. It encompasses 42 contributing buildings and three contributing sites in Vernon. The district largely developed between about 1830 and 1900, and includes notable examples of Italianate, Greek Revival, and Federal style architecture. Notable contributing resources include the Jennings County Courthouse (1859), American House tavern, "Rat Row" apartments (c. 1845), Jacob Clinton House (1834), Nures Drug Store (1853), Odd Fellows Lodge (1853), Judge Hickman New House (1832), John Bassnett House (1844), Gen. Robert S. Foster House (1840), Methodist Church (1817), Vernon Presbyterian Church (1832), Baptist Church (1871), a stone arch (1832), Tunnel Mill site, and Vinegar Mill site.

It was listed on the National Register of Historic Places in 1976.
