= Harry S. New =

American politician (1858–1937)

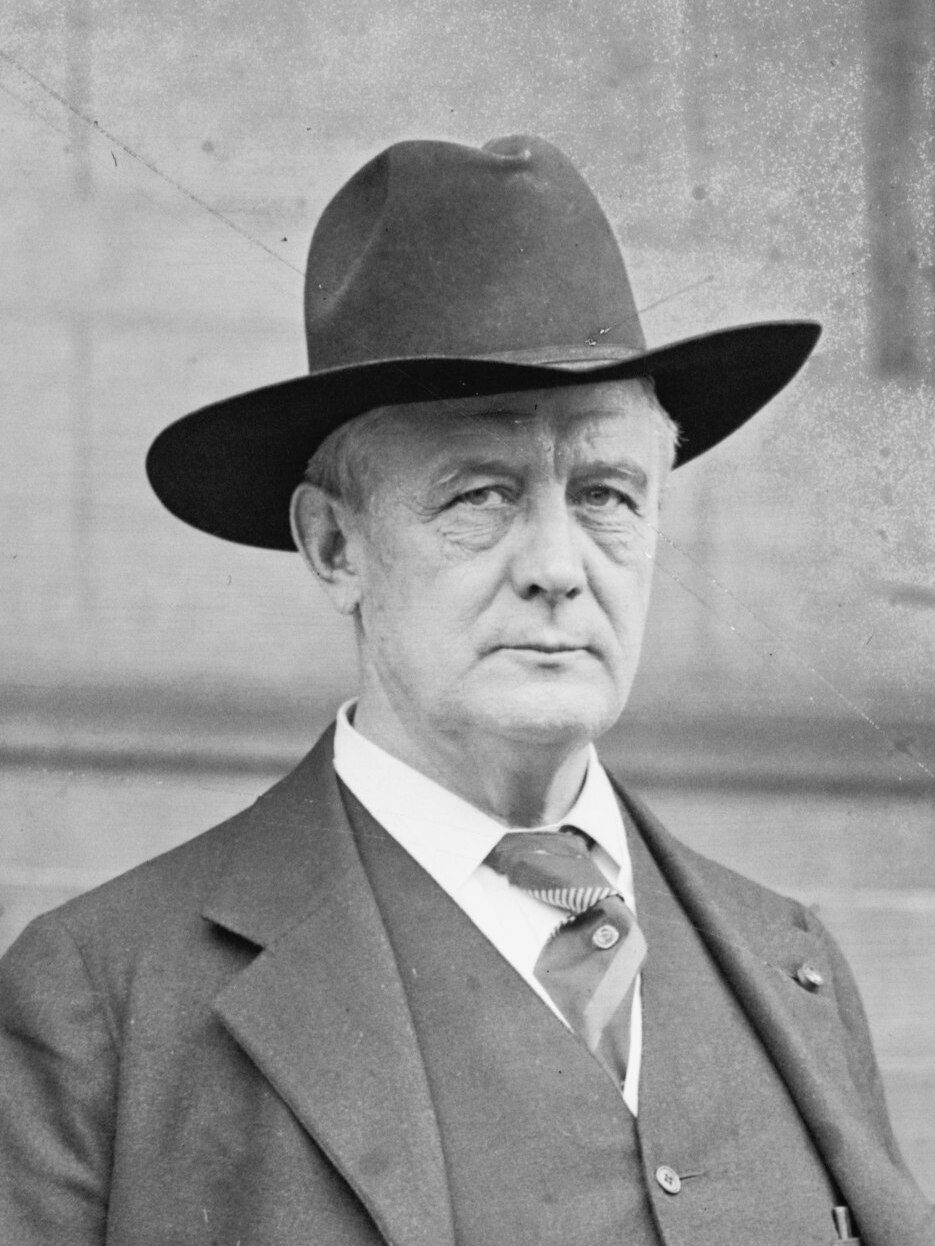
- New in 1923

48th United States Postmaster General
- In office March 4, 1923 – March 3, 1929
- President: Warren G. Harding; Calvin Coolidge
- Preceded by: Hubert Work
- Succeeded by: Walter Folger Brown

United States Senator from Indiana
- In office March 4, 1917 – March 3, 1923
- Preceded by: John W. Kern
- Succeeded by: Samuel M. Ralston

Chair of the Republican National Committee
- In office January 7, 1907 – July 8, 1908; Acting: January 7, 1907 – March 4, 1907
- Preceded by: George B. Cortelyou
- Succeeded by: Frank Hitchcock

Personal details
- Born: Harry Stewart New; December 31, 1858 Indianapolis, Indiana, U.S.
- Died: May 9, 1937 (aged 78) Baltimore, Maryland, U.S.
- Resting place: Crown Hill Cemetery and Arboretum, Section 8, Lot 4, indianapolis, indiana 39.8198194°N 86.1725873°W
- Party: Republican
- Spouse(s): Katherine Virginia Milligan; Catherine McLean Brown
- Children: 1
- Relatives: John C. New (father)
- Education: Butler University

Military service
- Allegiance: United States
- Branch/service: United States Army
- Rank: Captain
- Battles/wars: Spanish–American War

Harry Stewart New (December 31, 1858 – May 9, 1937) was a U.S. politician, journalist, and Spanish–American War veteran. He served as Chairman of the Republican National Committee, a United States senator from Indiana, and United States Postmaster General.

== Biography ==
Harry Stewart New was born in Indianapolis, Indiana on December 31, 1858, the son of John C. New and Melissa (Beeler) New. His father served as Treasurer of the United States and his uncle, Jeptha D. New, was a U.S. Representative. He attended Butler University before going to work for the Indianapolis Journal where he was a reporter, editor, part owner, and publisher from 1878 to 1903. He is a member of the Sigma Chi fraternity. He served in the Indiana State Senate from 1896 to 1900 and served in the Spanish–American War as captain and assistant adjutant general of the 7th Army Corps. He was a member of the Republican National Committee from 1900 to 1912, serving as chairman from 1907 to 1908, and later engaged in the stone quarrying and construction business.

New returned to politics with his election to the United States Senate in 1916, defeating incumbent John W. Kern. In the Senate, he served as chairman of the Committee on Territories and the Committee on Territories and Insular Possessions. He was also a "wet" or an anti-prohibitionist, and in August 1919 introduced early legislation proposing an independent United States Air Force.

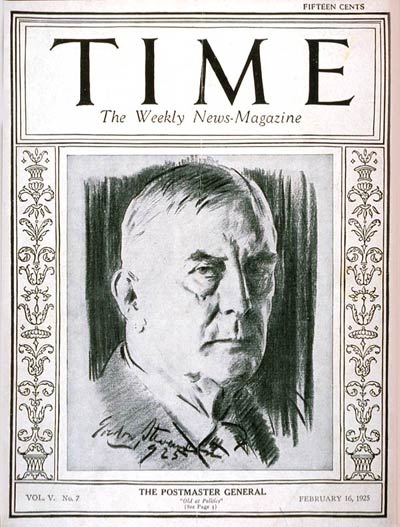
Time cover, February 16, 1925

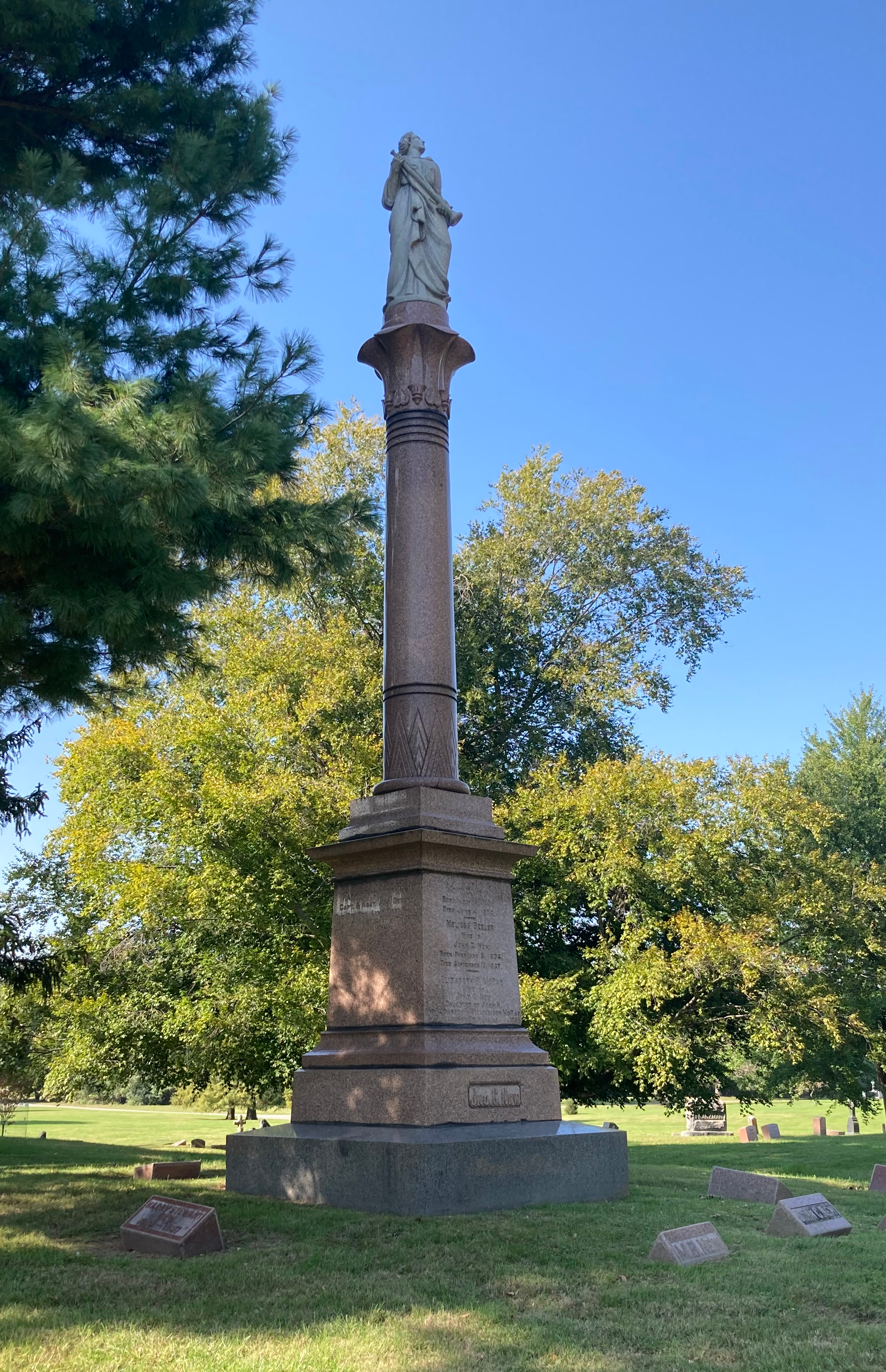
New's grave at Crown Hill Cemetery

In late March 1922, New became the first senator to use radio in his campaign—at that time, broadcasting a political speech was not widely done by candidates. His speech was transmitted by a U.S. Navy station, NOF in Washington, D.C., which immediately caused a complaint by Democrats about a government station being used for partisan purposes. This in turn quickly led to a ban on further use of the station for political activities.

New was defeated by Albert J. Beveridge for renomination in 1922 who lost the general election to Samuel M. Ralston. He was then appointed Postmaster General in the cabinet of President Warren G. Harding in 1923 and was reappointed by Calvin Coolidge in 1925.

After the end of the Coolidge Administration, New retired from active business pursuits and resided in Washington, D.C. In 1933, he was appointed a United States Commissioner to the Century of Progress Exposition in Chicago, Illinois. He died in Baltimore, Maryland, on May 9, 1937, and was interred in Crown Hill Cemetery in Indianapolis.

Party political offices
| Preceded by George B. Cortelyou | Chair of the Republican National Committee; 1907–1908 | Succeeded by Frank Hitchcock |
| First | Republican nominee for U.S. Senator from Indiana (Class 1); 1916 | Succeeded by Albert J. Beveridge |
U.S. Senate
| Preceded by John W. Kern | U.S. Senator (Class 1) from Indiana; 1917–1923; Served alongside: James Eli Watson | Succeeded by Samuel M. Ralston |
Political offices
| Preceded by Hubert Work | United States Postmaster General; 1923–1929 | Succeeded by Walter Brown |
Awards and achievements
| Preceded by Mackenzie King | Cover of Time magazine 16 February 1925 | Succeeded by Owen D. Young |
