= Scipio, Indiana =

- Census-designated place
- Location of Scipio in Jennings County, Indiana

- Location within Indiana Location within the United States
- Coordinates: 39°04′38″N 85°42′58″W
- Country: United States
- State: Indiana
- County: Jennings
- Township: Geneva

Area
  - Total: 1.17 sq mi (3.03 km^{2})
  - Land: 1.15 sq mi (2.97 km^{2})
  - Water: 0.019 sq mi (0.05 km^{2})
- Elevation: 669 ft (204 m)

Population (2020)
  - Total: 197
  - Density: 171.6/sq mi (66.25/km^{2})
- ZIP code: 47273
- Area code: 812
- FIPS code: 18-68328
- GNIS feature ID: 2587024

Scipio is an unincorporated community and census-designated place (CDP) in Geneva Township, Jennings County, Indiana, United States. As of the 2020 census, Scipio had a population of 197.

== History ==
Scipio was laid out in 1839 and named for Scipio Africanus.

Scipio High School gained notoriety in the early 1920s for the success of its girls' basketball team known as the "Black Diamonds". The Black Diamond team won the Jennings County tournament and beat many successful teams during a four-year stretch where they were undefeated.

== Geography ==
Scipio is located in northwestern Jennings County at the center of Geneva Township. Indiana State Road 7 passes through the center of the community, leading southeast 7 miles (11 km) to North Vernon and northwest 14 miles (23 km) to Columbus.

According to the U.S. Census Bureau, the Scipio CDP has a total area of 1.2 square miles (3.0 km^{2}), of which 0.02 square miles (0.05 km^{2}), or 1.74%, are water. Sand Creek, a west-flowing tributary of the East Fork of the White River, forms the northern edge of the CDP.

== Demographics ==
Historical population
Census	Pop.	Note	%±
2020	197		—
U.S. Decennial Census
