= Walnut Street Historic District (North Vernon, Indiana) =

Historic district in Indiana, United States

- U.S. National Register of Historic Places
- U.S. Historic district
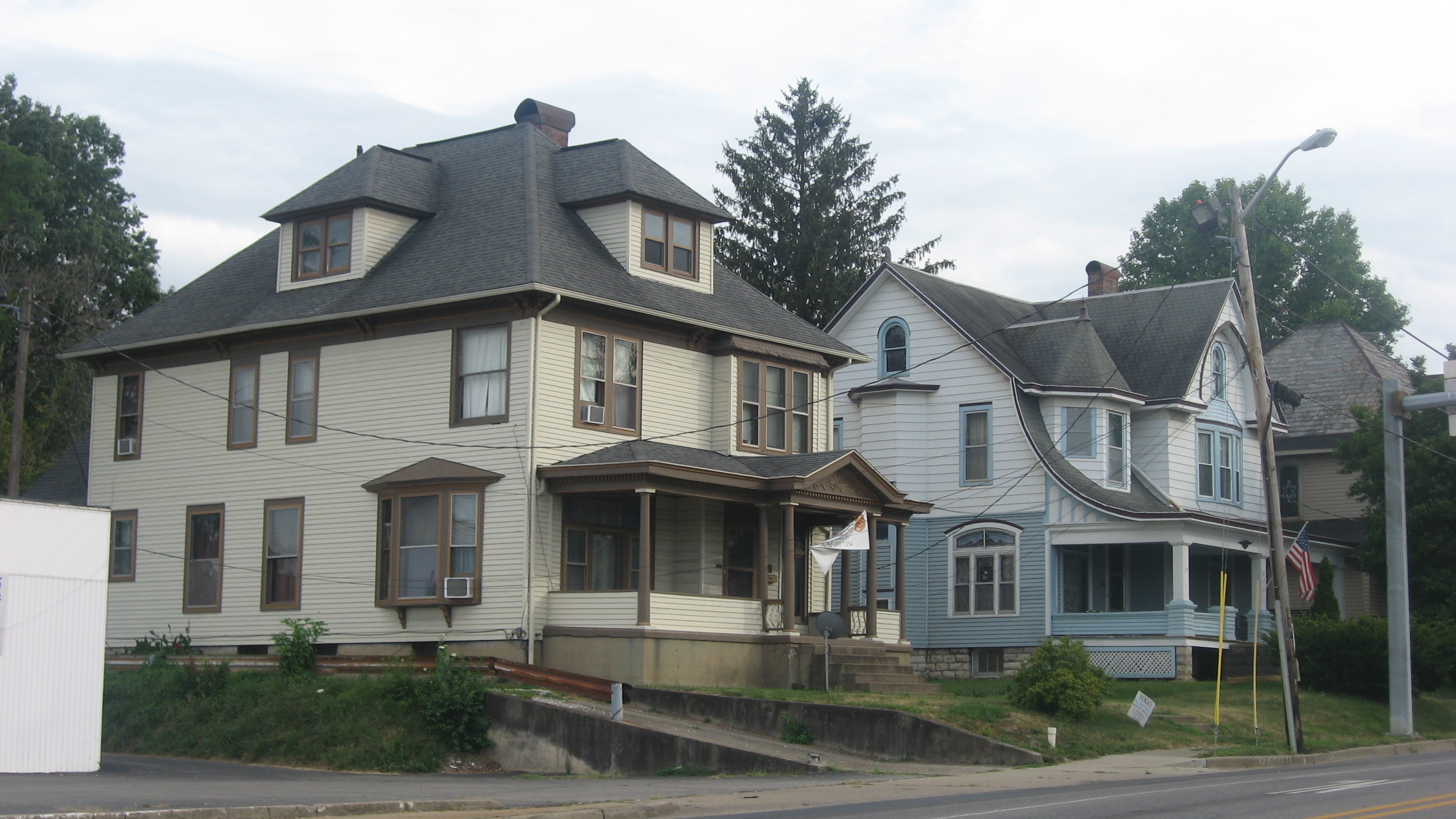
- West Walnut in North Vernon, July 2012

- Location within Indiana Location within the United States
- Location: Roughly including both sides of Walnut St. bet. State and Gum Sts., North Vernon, Indiana
- Coordinates: 39°00′11″N 85°37′38″W
- Area: 7 acres (2.8 ha)
- Built by: North Vernon Pump & Lumber Co.
- Architectural style: Late Victorian, Bungalow/craftsman
- NRHP reference No.: 06000855
- Added to NRHP: September 20, 2006

Walnut Street Historic District is a national historic district located at North Vernon, Indiana. It encompasses 17 contributing buildings in a predominantly residential of North Vernon. The district developed between about 1880 and 1950, and includes notable examples of Late Victorian and Bungalow / American Craftsman style architecture. Notable contributing buildings include the Platter House (1907), Charles Platter House (c. 1901), Frank Platter House (c. 1901), Gumble House (c. 1897), and John Cope House (c. 1870, 1892).

It was listed on the National Register of Historic Places in 2006.
