= Neu (disambiguation) =

Neu! is a German krautrock band.

Neu or NEU may also refer to:

== Education ==
- National Economics University, Hanoi, Vietnam
- National Education Union, a British teaching trade union
- Near East University, Lefkosa, Northern Cyprus
- New Era University, Quezon City, Philippines
- Northeastern University, Boston, Massachusetts, United States
- Northeastern University (China), Shenyang, Liaoning

== Music ==
- Neu, an album by Polysics
- Neu! (album), debut album by Neu!

== People with the surname ==
- Alexander Neu, German politician of The Left
- Anne Neu, American Republican politician
- Gisella Neu, American violinist

== Science ==
- HER2/neu, an oncogene
- Neuraminic acid

== Sports ==
- NorthEast United FC, football team based in Guwahati, Assam, India which competes in Indian Super League

== Other uses ==
- Tata Neu, an Indian super app
