= John C. New =

American politician (1831–1906)

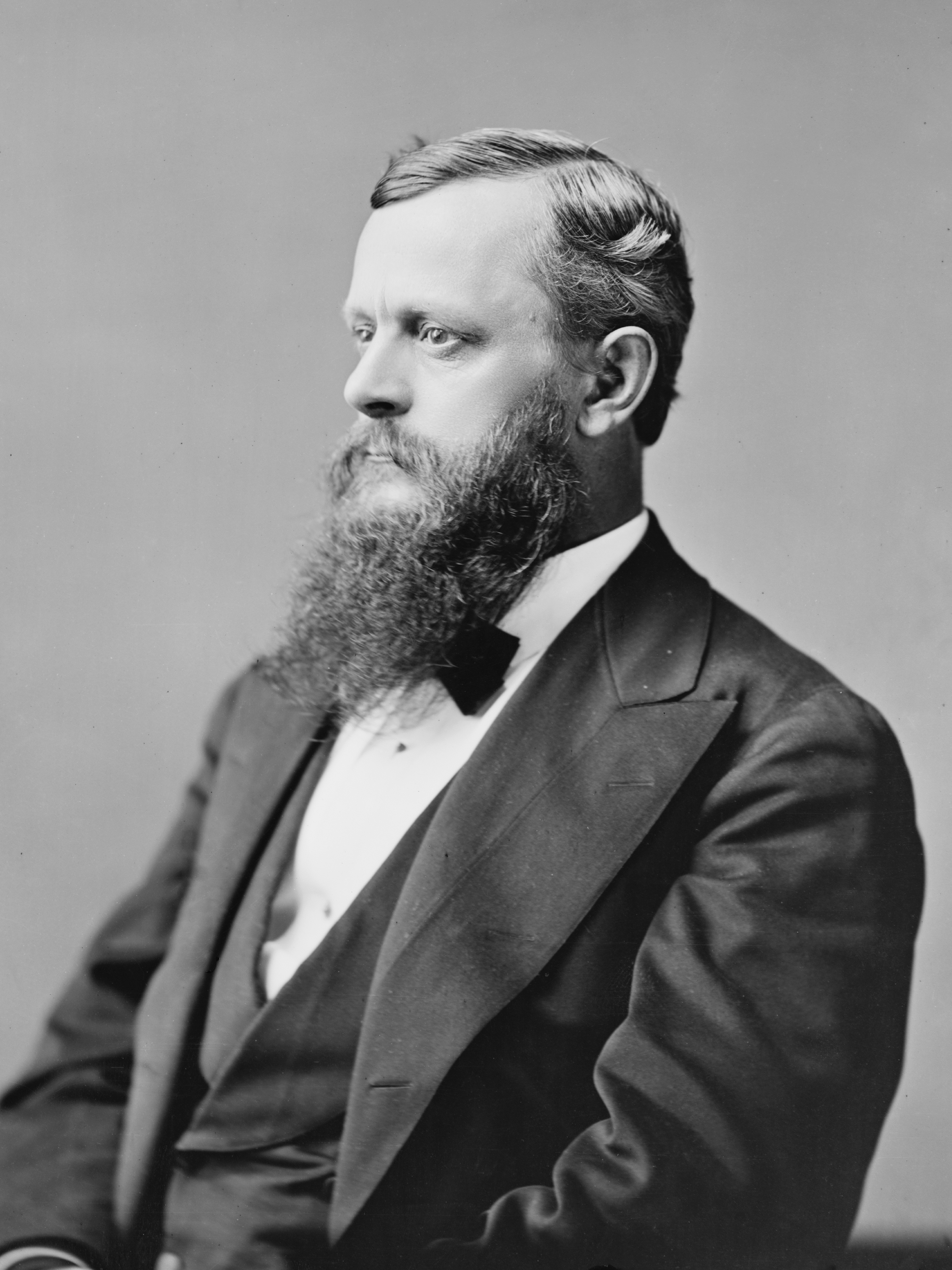
- New, 1865–1880

11th Treasurer of the United States
- In office June 30, 1875 – July 1, 1876
- President: Ulysses S. Grant
- Preceded by: Francis E. Spinner
- Succeeded by: A. U. Wyman

Personal details
- Born: John Chalfant New; July 6, 1831 Vernon, Indiana, U.S.
- Died: June 4, 1906 (aged 74) Indianapolis, Indiana, U.S.
- Resting place: Crown Hill Cemetery and Arboretum, Section 8, Lot 4, indianapolis, indiana 39.8180039°N 86.1725022°W
- Spouse(s): Melissa Beeler New (m. 1854; died 1867) Elizabeth R. McRae
- Children: Harry Stewart New; 2 other children
- Parent(s): John Bowman New; Mariah Chalfant New
- Relatives: Jethro New (grandfather)
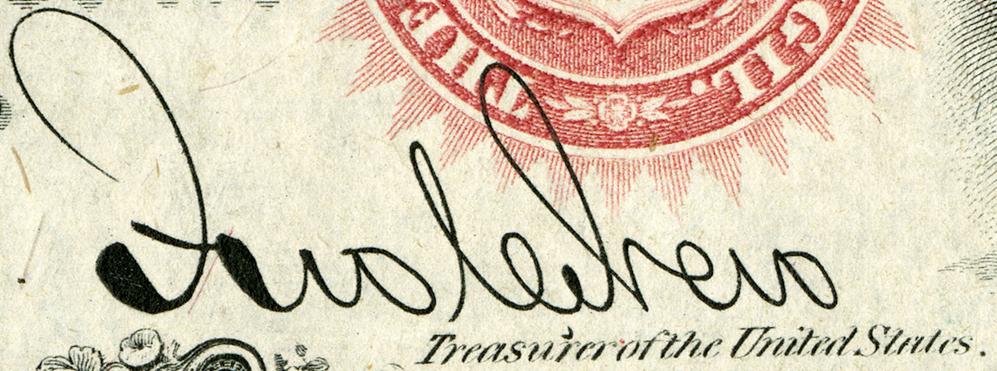
- Signature

John Chalfant New (July 6, 1831 – June 4, 1906) was a United States banker and lawyer who held a variety of government positions. He was Treasurer of the United States from 1875 to 1876.

== Biography ==
John C. New was born on July 6, 1831, in Vernon, Indiana. His father was John Bowman New, son of Jethro New, and his mother was Mariah (Chalfant) New. His uncle was Robert A. New. His brother was Jeptha D. New. He was educated at Bethany College, studying law and graduating in 1851.

After college, New worked as a banker, publisher, and lawyer. He married Melissa Beeler in 1854; together the two had a son, Harry Stewart New, born in 1858.

Following the resignation of Horatio C. Newcomb from his seat in the Indiana Senate, New was elected to Newcomb's former seat in 1863.

His first wife died in 1867 and he remarried to Elizabeth R. McRae, and the couple had two children together. She was born in Louisiana on February 4, 1845, and died in Indianapolis on February 19, 1935.

In 1875, President of the United States Ulysses S. Grant nominated New to be Treasurer of the United States, and New subsequently held that office from June 30, 1875, to July 1, 1876. In 1880, John New purchased the Indianapolis Journal, and also became chairman of the Indiana Republican Party. In this position he gathered enough power to be called the "boss of Indiana Republican politics."

As the leader of the Indiana delegation to the Republican National Convention held in Chicago in June 1880, New led the Indiana delegation in casting 26 of Indiana's 30 delegate votes for James G. Blaine. However, Blaine did not win the nomination on the first ballot at the Chicago Convention. Nor did Blaine or anyone else gather enough delegates to win the nomination for the thirty-three ballots as the convention dragged on in search of a nominee. Finally, on the 34th ballot, Wisconsin cast 16 delegate votes in favor of James A. Garfield, a "dark horse" candidate. Immediately, on the 35th ballot, James New and future President Benjamin Harrison brought 27 of the 30 Indiana delegates over to Garfield, starting a stampede at the convention that ended in the nomination of James A. Garfield as the Republican nominee for president.

In 1882, John New was again elected chairman of the Indiana Republican Party. He continued to serve in this position until he was appointed the First Assistant Secretary of the Treasury, a position he held from 1882 to 1883. New also served as U.S. consul general in London from 1889 to 1893.

New died in Indianapolis on June 4, 1906, and was buried at Crown Hill Cemetery.

== Notes ==
Government offices
Preceded by Francis E. Spinner	Treasurer of the United States; June 30, 1875 – July 1, 1876	Succeeded by A. U. Wyman
