= North Vernon Airport =

North Vernon Municipal Airport
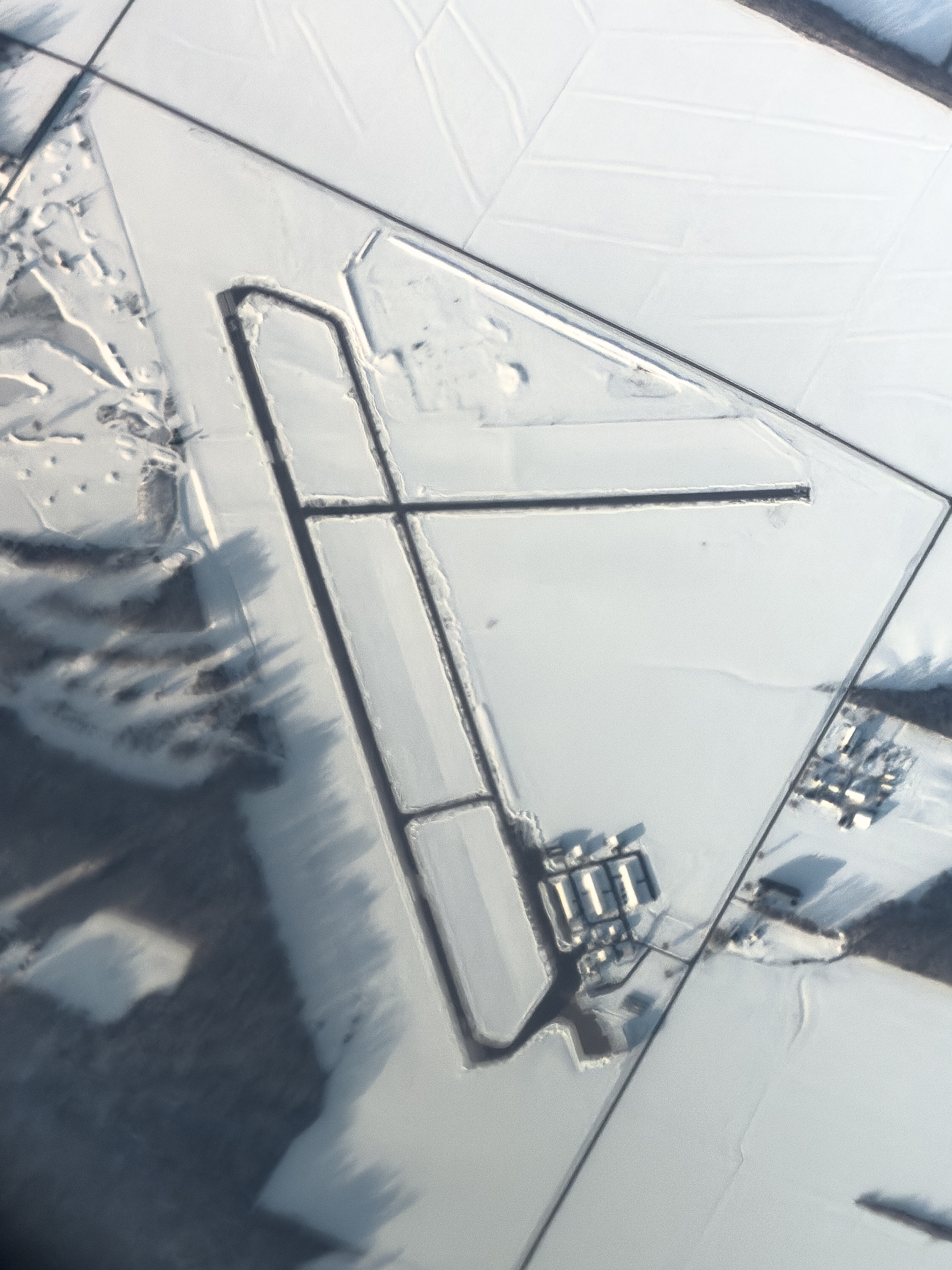
- North Vernon Municipal Airport in 2026
- IATA: none; ICAO: KOVO; FAA LID: OVO

Summary
- Airport type: Public
- Owner: North Vernon BOAC
- Location: North Vernon
- Elevation AMSL: 757.2 ft (230.8 m)
- Coordinates: 39°02′42″N 85°36′14″W
- Website: http://www.nvair.org/

Map
- Location of airport in Indiana/United States OVO (the United States)

Runways
Direction	Length		Surface
Direction	ft	m	Surface
5/23	5,002	1,525	Asphalt
15/33	2,730	832	Asphalt

North Vernon Municipal Airport (ICAO: KOVO, FAA LID: OVO) is a public airport 2 miles (3.2 km) northeast of North Vernon, in Jennings County, Indiana.

== History ==
=== Saint Anne Field ===
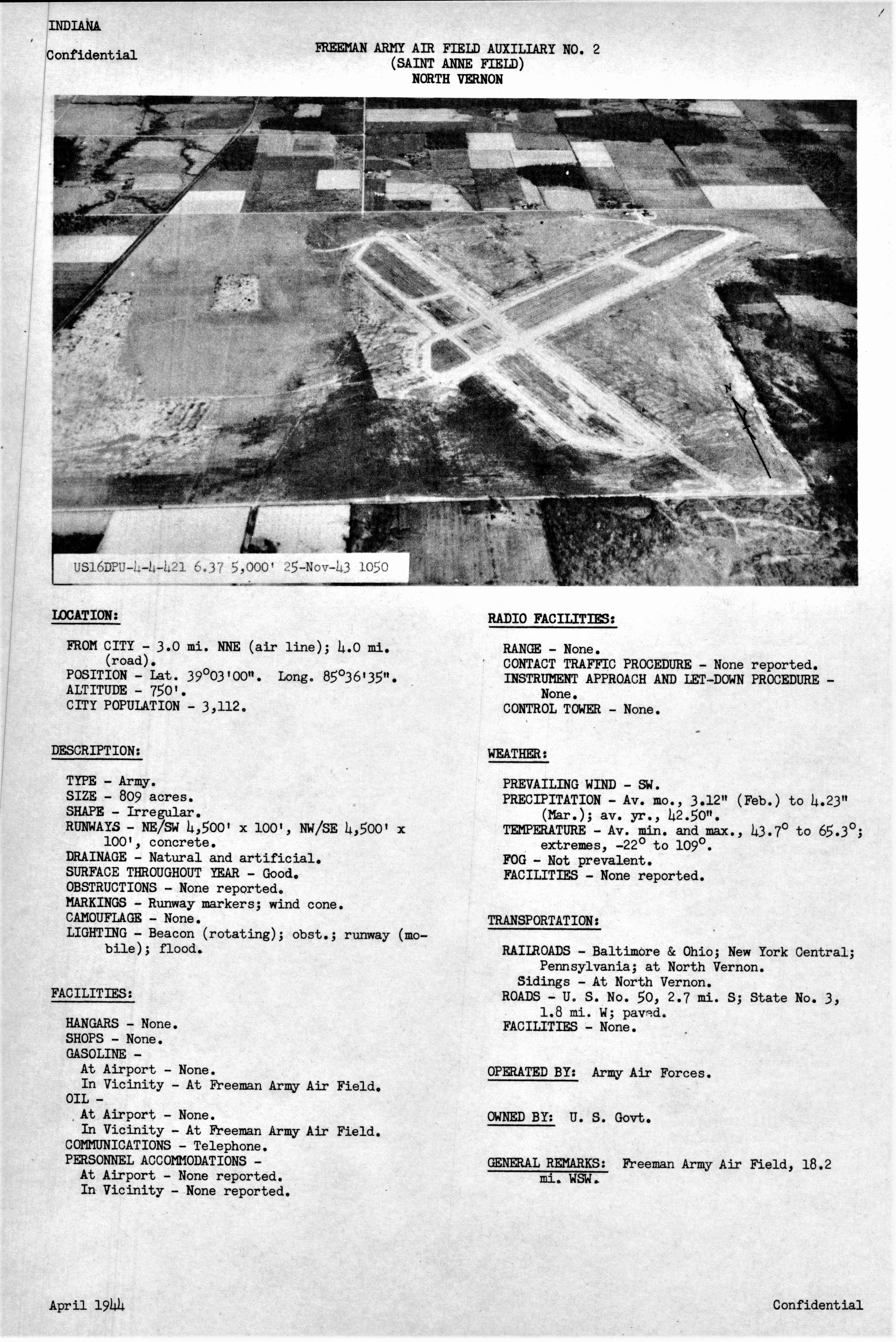
A 1944 file of the United States Army Air Forces on Saint Anne Field

The United States government purchased land appraised at $56,170.00, the equivalent to $1,078,441 in 2024, in August 1942 for the United States Army Air Forces to serve as an auxiliary airfield for Freeman Army Airfield, which was located 18.2 miles (29.3 km) west-southwest from the area. Construction for the airfield and of the Freeman Army Airfield occurred simultaneously later that year.

Local newspapers at the time detailed families leaving their homes located in the area, which were demolished to make way for the airfield. The construction process required extensive preparation, with the 809 acres (3.27 km^{2}) of land requiring extensive preparation including the cutting of 173 acres (0.70 km^{2}) of trees, the moving of 25,785,000 cubic feet (730,150 m^{3}) of earth and the placement of 162,310 square yards (135,710 m^{2}) of concrete. The airfield was the only auxiliary airfield for Freeman Army Airfield to use concrete. The airfield was founded as Saint Anne Field, or St. Anne Auxiliary Field No. 2, in February 1944.

=== Municipal airport ===
Clarence “Cap” Cornish, a former Aviation Section, U.S. Signal Corps pilot who served as chief of the Flight Operations Division of the Army Air Forces and later director of the Indiana Aeronautics Commission, Cornish pushed for military airbases to be converted into local airports. Cornish received approval to convert Saint Anne Field to civilian use in the fiscal year of 1947/1947 and in 1948, the United States government transferred ownership of the airfield to the City of North Vernon, with the airfield being renamed North Vernon Airport.

In the 1990s, the facilities of the airport comprised a small, two-room shed that had two bathrooms and a blackboard. At the time, the airport only had three hangars and eight stalls. In the subsequent decades, multiple upgrades and expansions helped modernize the airport, including a new automated airport weather station. Runway 5/23 was upgraded in 2012 to enhance its capability to handle larger aircraft.

The airport was awarded Indiana Airport of the Year in 2012 and 2023, the only airport to win the award twice. By 2026, the airport had stalls for 50 aircraft and plans to construct new aircraft hangars were in the words due to a waitlist for pilots looking to store aircraft at the airport.

== Facilities ==
The airport has two runways; the 5,000-foot (1,500 m) long, 75-foot (23 m) wide 5/23 runway and the 2,730-foot (830 m), 60-foot (18 m) wide 15/33 runway.

Buildings at the airport house conference rooms, a pilot's lounge for flight planning and a passenger lobby with some concierge service.

For maintenance, two full service shops are located on site. Fueling has both self-serve and full service capabilities.

== Accidents and incidents ==
In November 1988, an accident happened near the airport resulting in the deaths of the airport mechanic Gilbert Green, who was piloting, and his son Roger.
