= North Vernon Downtown Historic District =

Historic district in Indiana, United States

- U.S. National Register of Historic Places
- U.S. Historic district
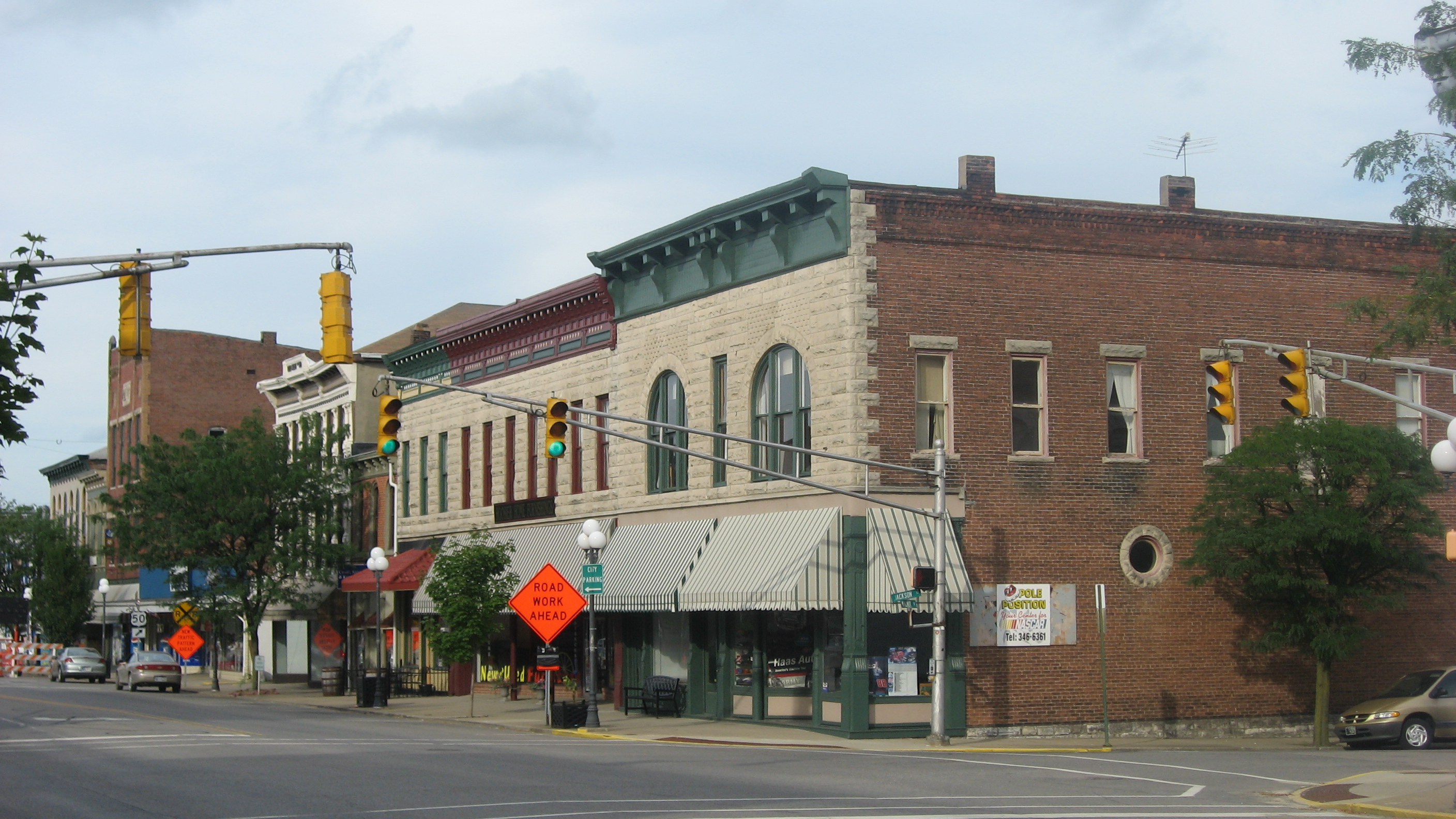
- Walnut at Jackson in North Vernon, July 2012

- Location within Indiana Location within the United States
- Location: Bounded by Sixth and Chestnut Sts., Keller St., Fourth and Main, and Jennings, North Vernon, Indiana
- Coordinates: 39°00′20″N 85°37′28″W
- Area: 14 acres (5.7 ha)
- Architect: Mesker, George L., & Company
- Architectural style: Federal, Italianate, et al.
- NRHP reference No.: 06000306
- Added to NRHP: April 19, 2006

North Vernon Downtown Historic District is a national historic district located at North Vernon, Indiana, United States. It encompasses 80 contributing buildings and one contributing structure in the central business district of North Vernon. The district developed between about 1852 and 1955, and includes notable examples of Federal, Italianate, Classical Revival, and Bungalow / American Craftsman style architecture. Notable contributing buildings include the First Christian Church (c. 1890, 1940), M.T. Lindley Building (1891), N.C. Bank (c. 1910), Masonic Lodge (1899), Red Man Lodge #99 (c. 1880), Jennings County Carnegie Library (1920), Bantz Building (c. 1880), Ades Building (1913), Perry-Verbiage Building (c. 1885), Couchman Building (c. 1870, 1910), and Gottwalles Grocery (1893).

It was listed on the National Register of Historic Places in 2006.
