= State Street Historic District (North Vernon, Indiana) =

Historic district in Indiana, United States

- U.S. National Register of Historic Places
- U.S. Historic district
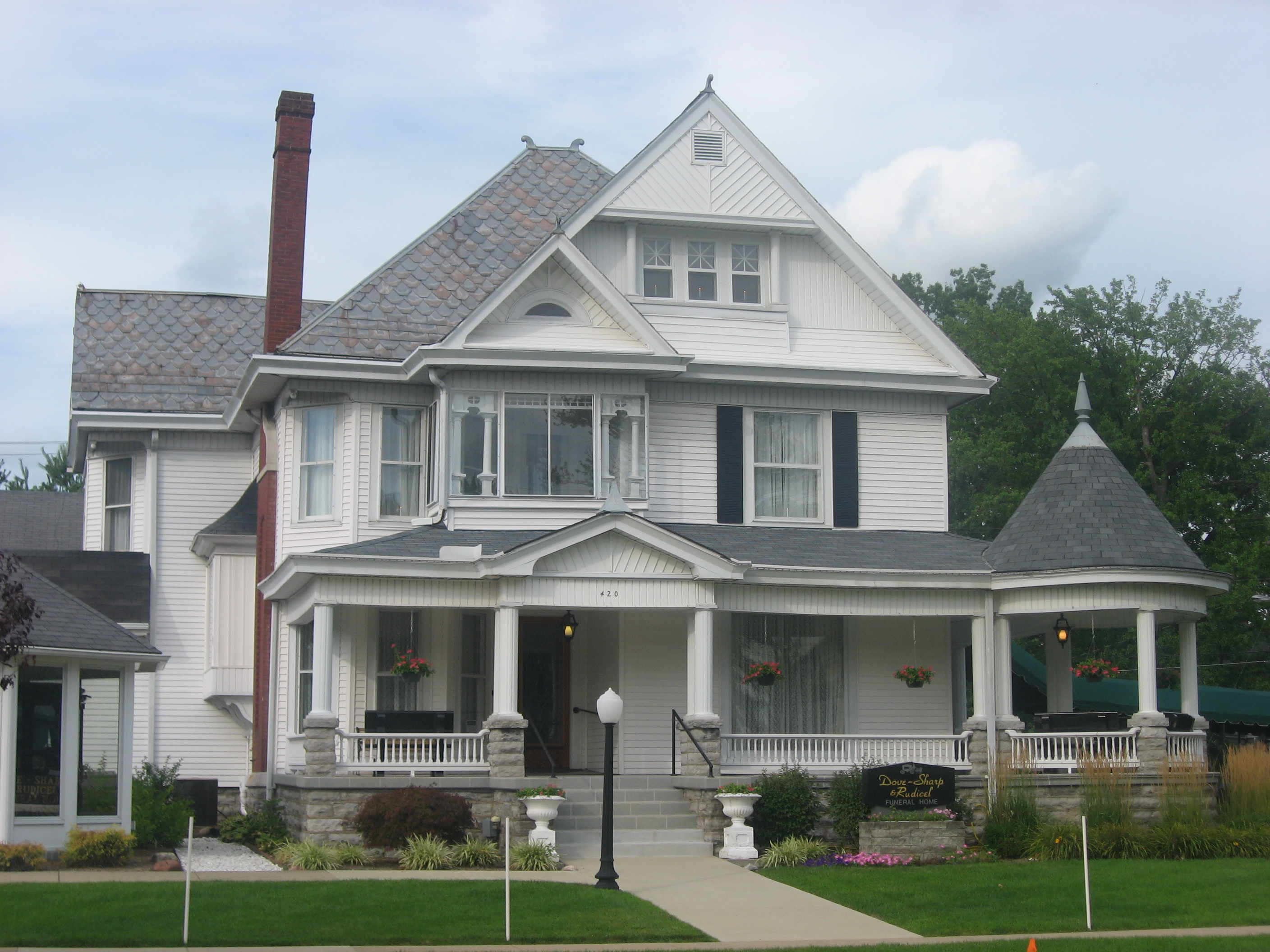
- DSR Funeral Home, July 2012

- Location within Indiana Location within the United States
- Location: Roughly bounded by Chestnut, Jackson, Jefferson, State Sts., North Vernon, Indiana
- Coordinates: 39°00′04″N 85°37′24″W
- Area: 24 acres (9.7 ha)
- Built: 1853
- Architect: Barber, George F.
- Architectural style: Queen Anne, Bungalow/craftsman, et al.
- NRHP reference No.: 06001290
- Added to NRHP: January 25, 2007

State Street Historic District is a national historic district located at North Vernon, Indiana. It encompasses 75 contributing buildings and four contributing structures in a predominantly residential of North Vernon. The district developed between about 1852 and 1950, and includes notable examples of Queen Anne and Bungalow / American Craftsman style architecture. Notable contributing buildings include the First Baptist Church (1905), First Presbyterian Church (1871), Olcott House (now Dove, Sharp, and Rudicel Funeral Home, 1907), McGannon-Olcott House (c. 1868), Charles Watchell House (c. 1893), Frank Little House (c. 1898), Tripp / Verbarg House (c. 1891), and Joseph C. Cone House (c. 1894).

It was listed on the National Register of Historic Places in 2007.
