= Annadale (North Vernon, Indiana) =

Historic house in Indiana, United States

- U.S. National Register of Historic Places
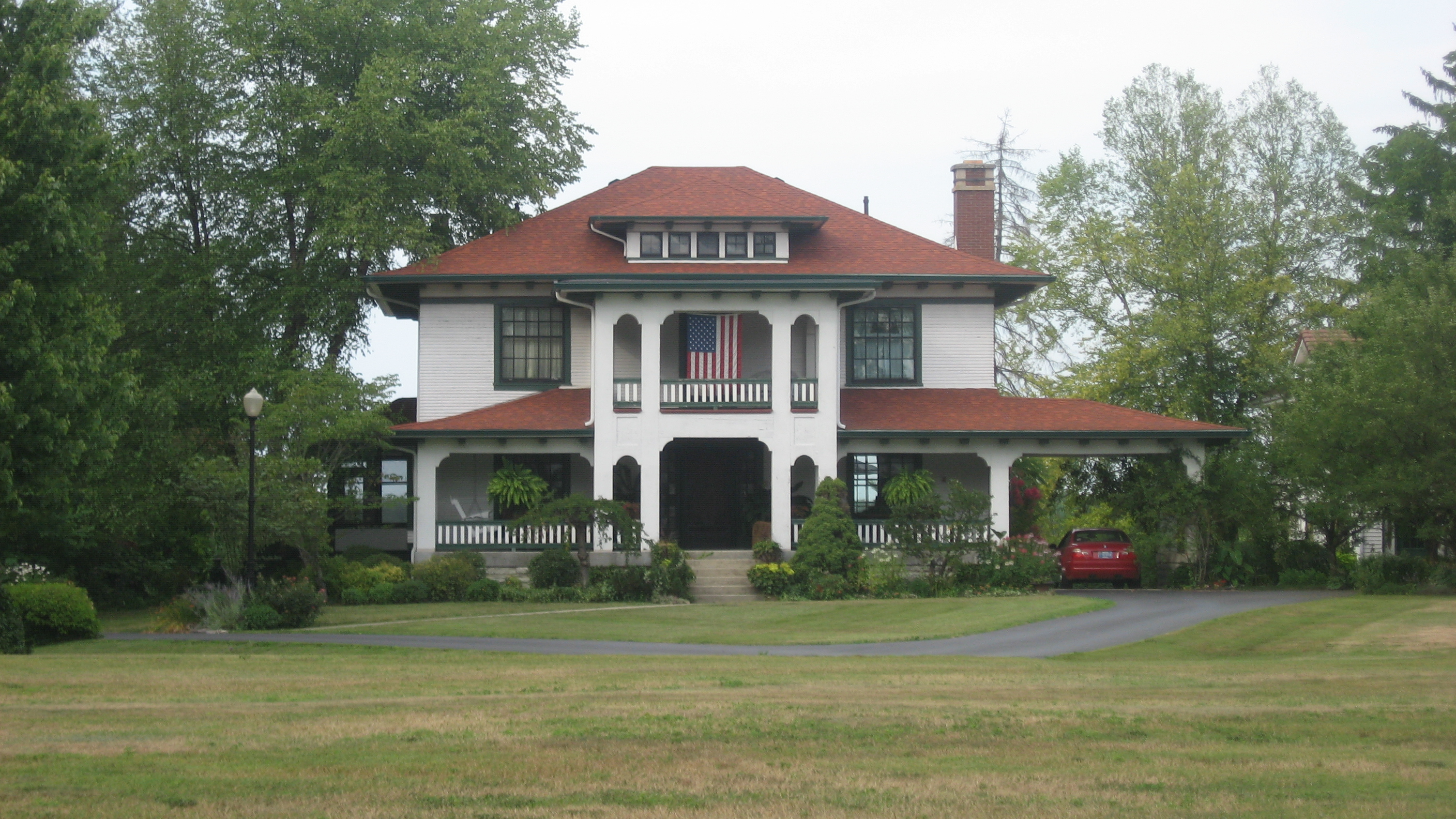
- Annadale, July 2012

- Location within Indiana Location within the United States
- Location: 502 Jennings St., North Vernon, Indiana
- Coordinates: 39°0′38″N 85°37′15″W
- Area: 4.7 acres (1.9 ha)
- Built: 1910
- Architectural style: Bungalow/craftsman
- NRHP reference No.: 06001292
- Added to NRHP: January 25, 2007

Annadale is a historic home located at North Vernon, Indiana. It was built about 1910, and is a two-story, Bungalow / American Craftsman style frame dwelling. It has a low pitched, clay tile hipped roof and sits on a full basement. It features a two-story front porch, large chimney, and porte cochere. Also on the property are the contributing original garage (converted to living and office space) and privy.

It was listed on the National Register of Historic Places in 2007.
