= Indianapolis Journal =

Defunct American newspaper (1825–1905)

- Type: Daily newspaper
- Founder(s): John Douglass & Douglass Maguire
- Founded: 1825
- Political alignment: Whig and Republican
- Ceased publication: 1904
- Circulation: 11,000 (peak)

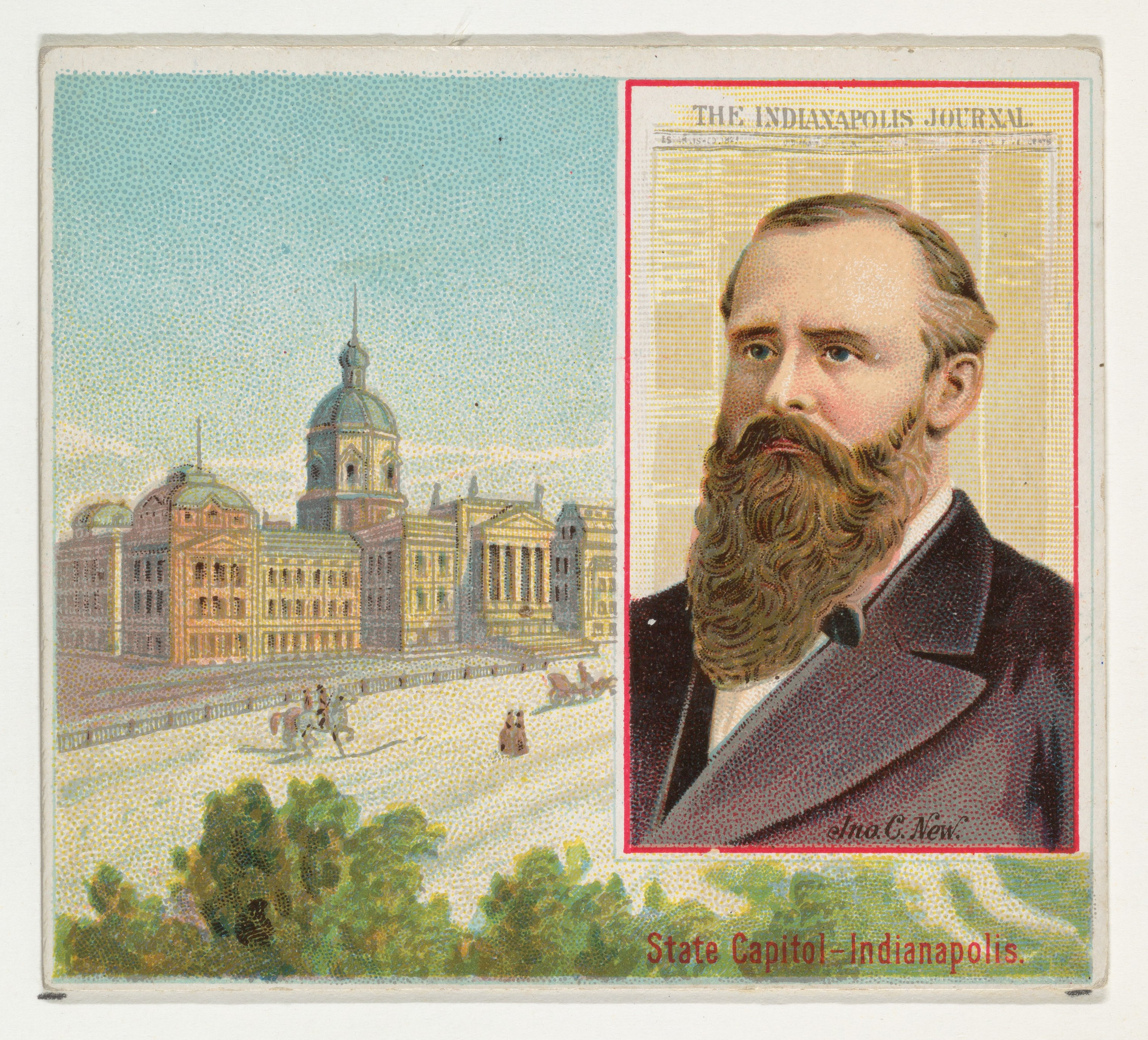
State capitol in Indianapolis and Indianapolis Journal editor John C. New

The Indianapolis Journal was a newspaper published in Indianapolis, Indiana, during the nineteenth and early twentieth centuries. The paper published daily editions every evening except on Sundays, when it published a morning edition.

== History ==
On March 7, 1823, Harvey Gregg and Douglas Maguire published the first issue of the Western Censor & Emigrants' Guide, a year after the city's first newspaper, the Indianapolis Gazette, was established. On October 19, 1824, Gregg sold his interest in the paper to John Douglass. Douglass and Maquire published the Western Censor until renaming it as the Indiana Journal on January 11, 1825, and expanded and enlarged the publication.

From the outset the paper advocated for government-sponsored internal improvements and protective tariffs that would aid Indiana's agricultural economy. These positions led the Journal to align with the Whig Party beginning in the mid-1830s. Purchased in 1845 by John D. Defrees, and operated by him for nearly a decade, the paper was the first in Indianapolis to install a steam driven printing press. Under his leadership, the paper became Indianapolis's first permanent daily, the Daily Indiana State Journal, in April 1851. The title changed to Indianapolis Morning Journal in 1853, then to Indianapolis Daily Journal the following year, and ultimately to Indianapolis Journal in 1867.

Berry R. Sulgrove joined the Journal in 1854 as editor and acquired a controlling interest in the paper a few years later. He transitioned the paper from the Whig to the Republican camp. During the Civil War, Sulgrove published strong pro-Union columns supporting the policies of President Abraham Lincoln and of Indiana governor Oliver P. Morton. During the war, the Journal's daily circulation reached 6,000; while that of the Democrat and Copperhead-aligned Indianapolis Sentinel saw a decline in its daily readership due to interference and shutdowns enforced by Morton.

The Journal purchased several other Indianapolis newspapers during Sulgrove's ownership. These included the Atlas in 1861, the Evening Gazette in 1867, the Evening Commercial in 1871, and the Daily Times in 1879.

John C. New, a banker, attorney, and leading Indianapolis-area Republican figure, purchased the Journal in 1880. New's leadership helped the paper excel, dramatically increasing its readership. In 1886, New bought the Indianapolis TImes, which was published in the afternoon. Rival papers, including the Indianapolis Mirror, went out of business, leaving the Journal as the only daily newspaper in the Indianapolis metropolitan area.

The paper featured regular columns from famous writers and figures including James Whitcomb Riley, Benjamin Harrison, and Eugene V. Debs. Riley's poem "Little Orphant Annie" was first published in the paper in 1885. During most of its history, the paper consisted of eight 31-by-45-inch (790 mm × 1,140 mm) pages and at its peak had a circulation of 11,000.

The paper commonly supported Republican candidates for office and published editorials supporting Republicans positions. During the late nineteenth century competition from the Indianapolis Star began a decline in the Journal's readership. The Star eventually took a majority readership in the region. Charles S. Henry bought the paper from the New family in 1903, but sold it to the Star in June 1904. The combined papers were published as the Star and Journal until October of that year, at which time the Journal was dropped from the paper's name.
