= Benham, Indiana =

- Unincorporated community
- Location within Indiana Location within the United States
- Coordinates: 38°58′51″N 85°14′56″W
- Country: United States
- State: Indiana
- County: Ripley
- Township: Brown
- Elevation: 968 ft (295 m)
- Time zone: UTC-5 (Eastern (EST))
  - Summer (DST): UTC-4 (EDT)
- ZIP code: 47042
- Area codes: 812, 930
- GNIS feature ID: 430806

Benham is an unincorporated community in Brown Township, Ripley County, in the U.S. state of Indiana.

== History ==
An old variant name of the community was Benhams Store. A post office opened under the name Benham Store in 1866, the name was shortened to Benham in 1888, and the post office was discontinued in 1934. John Benham Jr., served as a first postmaster.
