= Indiana State Road 7 =

State highway in Indiana, United States

State Road 7
- SR 7 highlighted in red

Route information
- Maintained by INDOT
- Length: 36.549 mi (58.820 km)

Major junctions
- South end: SR 56 in Madison
- US 31 near Columbus
- North end: SR 46 in Columbus

Location
- Country: United States
- State: Indiana
- Counties: Jefferson, Jennings, Bartholomew

Highway system
- Indiana State Highway System; Interstate; US; State; Scenic
| ← US 6 | → SR 8 |

State Road 7 in the U.S. state of Indiana is located in southeast Indiana. It runs from northwest-to-southeast connecting the cities of Columbus and Madison.

== Route description ==
SR 7 begins at Main Street in Madison, of which it then travels in a northward direction along Cragmont Street. Along the way, SR 7 briefly meanders through hilly terrain. After leaving the hilly terrain, SR 7 briefly turns northwest on another road before turning west near a railroad crossing. As the road approaches the east side of Clifty Falls State Park, the road curves northwest again, becoming Lanier Drive. After that, the route intersects with SR 56/SR 62 (Clifty Drive). On its way toward Vernon, SR 7 travels northwest and reaching the following towns and state route: Wirt, Midway, SR 250 (western section), Dupont, Walnut Ridge, and Grayford.

Before the route enters Vernon, SR 3 begins to run concurrently with SR 7 through Vernon and North Vernon. After crossing the Muscatatuck River, the road enters the town of Vernon. In this town, the routes travel along Jackson and Poplar streets. Both routes leave the town limit as they approach the Muscatatuck County Park and the city of North Vernon. Both run along State Street through downtown North Vernon. Just before leaving the city limit, SR 3 turns northward, while SR 7 continues northwest. SR 7 then intersects with US 50.

For the remainder of the route, SR 7 travels northwestward, serving Country Squire Lakes, Queensville, Scipio, and Elizabethtown. As the route approaches the city of Columbus, SR 7 intersects with US 31. Shortly thereafter, the route ends at SR 46, where thru traffic continues toward downtown Columbus.

== History ==
Prior to 1926 the SR 7 designation was routed along the US 24 corridor. At this time modern SR 7 route was part of SR 26. In 1926 the modern route of SR 7 was planned to become part of SR 11 designation. Later in 1926 the SR 11 designation became SR 7, routed from Madison to Columbus. Between 1931 and 1932 the entire route of SR 7 became a hard driving surface. US 31 was rerouted onto SR 7 northwest of the modern intersection between the two roads between 1939 and 1941. By 1942 US 31 was rerouted onto its modern route towards Columbus. The northern end of SR 7 was moved to its current location, at SR 46, in either 1999 or 2000.

Three bronze markers in Madison, North Vernon, and Columbus designate the road as the "Guthrie Trail". The markers were placed for former Indiana State Senator William Guthrie of Dupont in the 1920s, who was instrumental in the road becoming a state highway.

== Major intersections ==
| County | Location | mi | km | Destinations | Notes |
|---|---|---|---|---|---|
| Jefferson | Madison | 0.000 | 0.000 | Main Street (Old State Road 56) | Southern terminus of SR 7 |
| Jefferson | Madison | 3.049 | 4.907 | SR 56 / SR 62 – Hanover | |
| Jefferson | Lancaster Township | 7.869 | 12.664 | SR 250 – Lancaster, Paris | Eastern terminus of SR 250 |
| Jennings | Vernon | 21.620 | 34.794 | SR 3 south | Southern end of SR 3 concurrency |
| Jennings | North Vernon | 25.842 | 41.589 | SR 3 north / US 50 | Northern end of SR 3 concurrency |
| Bartholomew | Elizabethtown | 35.985 | 57.912 | US 31 – Seymour, Columbus | |
| Bartholomew | Elizabethtown | 36.549 | 58.820 | SR 46 – Greensburg | Northern terminus of SR 7 |
1.000 mi = 1.609 km; 1.000 km = 0.621 mi: Concurrency terminus
