= North Vernon, Indiana =

- City
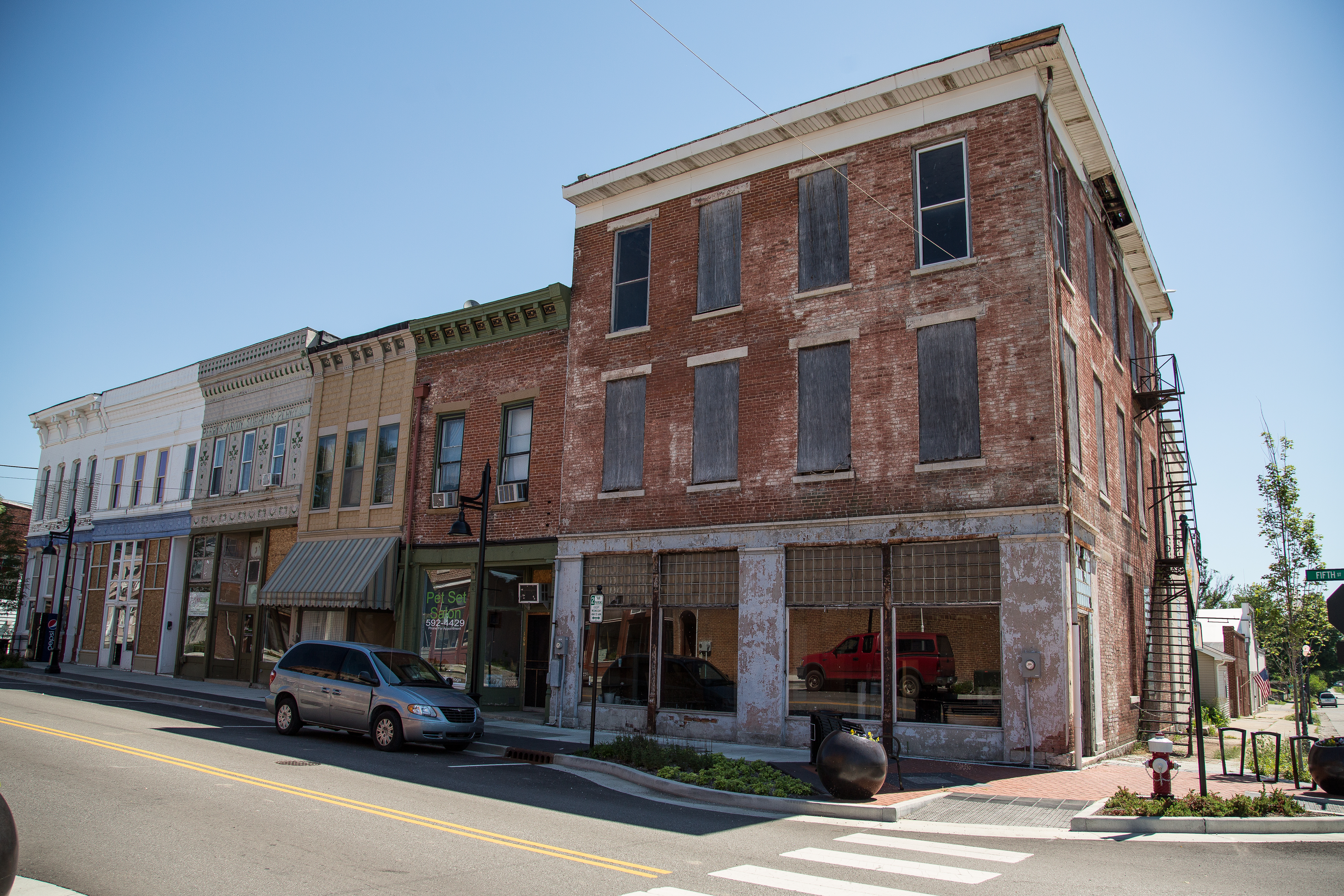
- Fifth Street in downtown North Vernon

- Flag Seal

- Location of North Vernon in Jennings County, Indiana
- Coordinates: 39°0′18″N 85°37′40″W
- Country: United States
- State: Indiana
- County: Jennings
- Townships: Center, Vernon
- Platted (as Tripton): 1854
- Incorporated: 1867

Government
  - Type: Mayor–council
  - Mayor: Shawn Gerkin (Democratic)

Area
  - Total: 7.68 sq mi (19.90 km^{2})
  - Land: 7.68 sq mi (19.88 km^{2})
  - Water: 0.012 sq mi (0.03 km^{2}) 0.15%
- Elevation: 719 ft (219 m)

Population (2020)
  - Total: 6,608
  - Density: 861.1/sq mi (332.46/km^{2})
- Time zone: UTC-5 (EST)
  - Summer (DST): UTC-4 (EDT)
- ZIP code: 47265
- Area code: 812
- FIPS code: 18-55116
- GNIS feature ID: 0440310
- Website: northvernon-in.gov

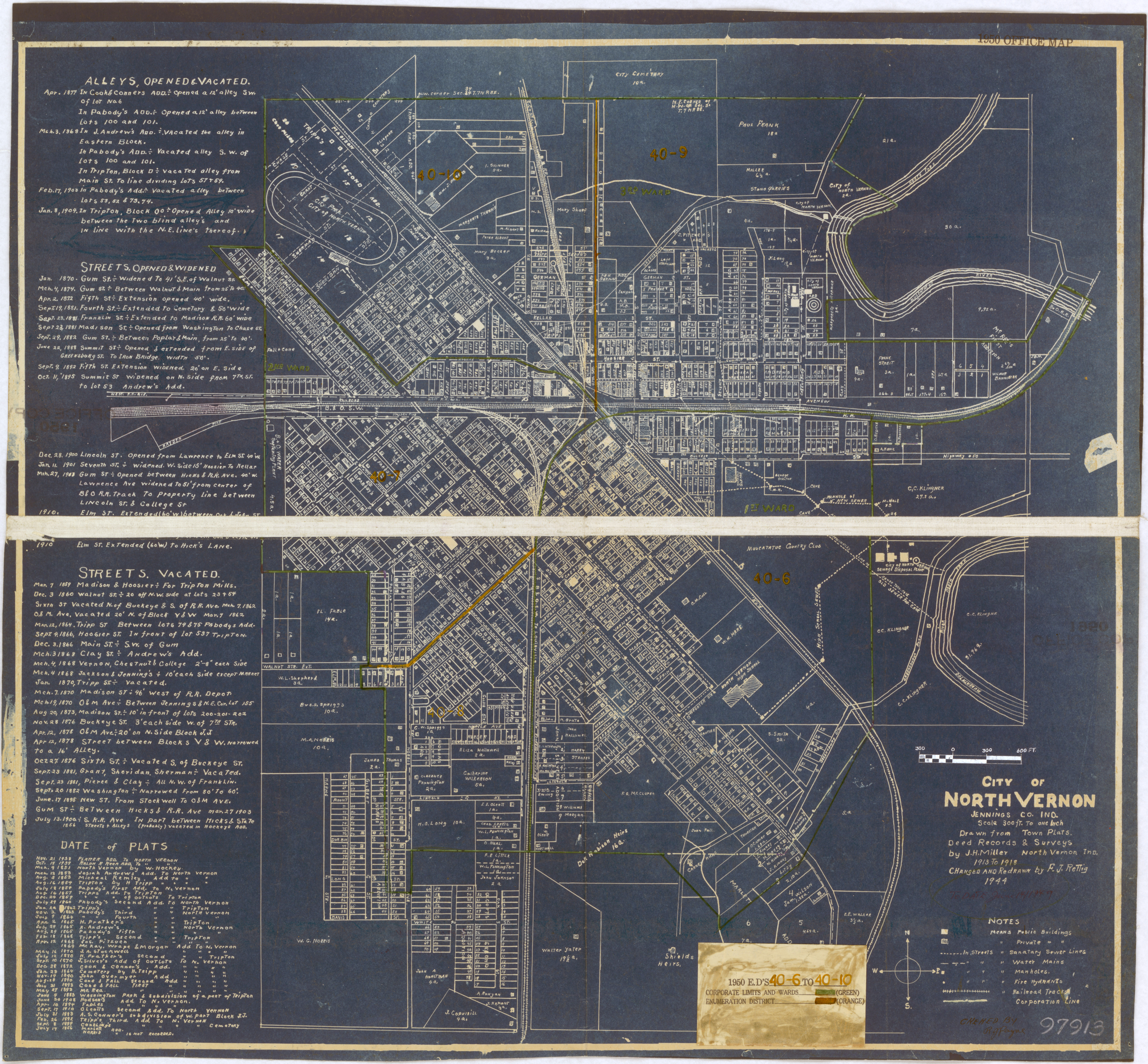
Map of North Vernon in 1950

North Vernon is a city in Jennings County, Indiana, United States. The population was 6,608 at the 2020 census, making it the largest city in Jennings County. It grew up in the 1850s at the crossing of two railroads about two miles north of the county seat of Vernon, from which it takes its name; originally platted as Tripton, it was incorporated as North Vernon in 1867.

== History ==
North Vernon grew up at the crossing of two railroads—the Madison and Indianapolis Railroad and the Ohio and Mississippi Railroad, construction of which began in 1852—about two miles north of the older county seat of Vernon. The junction, at first known simply as "The Crossing" and derided by Vernon residents as "Lickskillet," was developed by Colonel Hagerman Tripp, who with Hiram Prather acquired some 250 acres and platted a town there in 1854. It was named Tripton for Tripp, but the name was soon dropped—reportedly because of confusion with Tipton, Indiana—and the town was renamed North Vernon; it was incorporated in 1867.

During the American Civil War, the rail junction and the nearby railroad bridges over the Muscatatuck River made the area a target of Morgan's Raid. On July 11, 1863, Confederate cavalry under Brigadier General John Hunt Morgan demanded the surrender of Vernon, which was held by about 100 Indiana Legion militia under Colonel Hugh Williams and additional Union troops. The defenders stalled Morgan—asking first for time to consider and then to evacuate women and children—until roughly 1,000 troops under Brigadier General John Love arrived from Seymour. Rather than force a fight, Morgan bypassed the town toward Dupont, though his men burned railroad bridges and cut telegraph lines in the area.

In the summer of 1876, railroad workers at North Vernon and nearby Seymour—unpaid for about two and a half months by the financially troubled Ohio and Mississippi Railroad—went on strike; newspapers reported the towns as armed "and in revolt," and U.S. marshals and detectives were sent from Cincinnati to reopen the line.

Several places in North Vernon are listed on the National Register of Historic Places: Annadale, the North Vernon Downtown Historic District, the State Street Historic District, and the Walnut Street Historic District.

== Geography ==
According to the United States Census Bureau, North Vernon has a total area of 7.68 square miles (19.89 km^{2}), of which 7.67 square miles (19.87 km^{2}) is land and 0.01 square miles (0.03 km^{2}) is water.

=== Climate ===
North Vernon has hot, humid summers and cold winters typical of the Midwest. The monthly normals below are for the 1991–2020 period.

Climate data for North Vernon, Indiana (1991–2020 normals)
Month	Jan	Feb	Mar	Apr	May	Jun	Jul	Aug	Sep	Oct	Nov	Dec	Year
Mean daily maximum °F (°C)	40 (4)	45 (7)	56 (13)	67 (19)	75 (24)	83 (28)	86 (30)	85 (29)	79 (26)	68 (20)	56 (13)	43 (6)	65 (18)
Mean daily minimum °F (°C)	23 (−5)	26 (−3)	34 (1)	43 (6)	52 (11)	61 (16)	65 (18)	63 (17)	55 (13)	44 (7)	36 (2)	26 (−3)	44 (7)
Average precipitation inches (mm)	3.02 (77)	2.95 (75)	3.75 (95)	4.48 (114)	5.03 (128)	4.30 (109)	4.52 (115)	4.28 (109)	3.13 (80)	3.66 (93)	4.00 (102)	3.56 (90)	46.68 (1,186)
Average snowfall inches (cm)	4 (10)	5 (13)	1 (2.5)	0 (0)	0 (0)	0 (0)	0 (0)	0 (0)	0 (0)	0 (0)	0 (0)	4 (10)	14 (36)
Source: U.S. Climate Data

== Demographics ==
Historical population
Census	Pop.	Note	%±
1860	778		—
1870	1,758		126.0%
1880	1,842		4.8%
1890	2,012		9.2%
1900	2,823		40.3%
1910	2,915		3.3%
1920	3,084		5.8%
1930	2,989		−3.1%
1940	3,112		4.1%
1950	3,488		12.1%
1960	4,307		23.5%
1970	4,582		6.4%
1980	5,768		25.9%
1990	5,311		−7.9%
2000	6,515		22.7%
2010	6,728		3.3%
2020	6,608		−1.8%
U.S. Decennial Census

=== 2020 census ===
As of the 2020 census, North Vernon had a population of 6,608. The median age was 38.9 years. 23.1% of residents were under the age of 18 and 17.1% of residents were 65 years of age or older. For every 100 females there were 93.6 males, and for every 100 females age 18 and over there were 92.7 males age 18 and over.

96.0% of residents lived in urban areas, while 4.0% lived in rural areas.

There were 2,715 households in North Vernon, of which 30.0% had children under the age of 18 living in them. Of all households, 36.5% were married-couple households, 21.2% were households with a male householder and no spouse or partner present, and 32.3% were households with a female householder and no spouse or partner present. About 34.6% of all households were made up of individuals and 14.4% had someone living alone who was 65 years of age or older.

There were 2,943 housing units, of which 7.7% were vacant. The homeowner vacancy rate was 1.9% and the rental vacancy rate was 5.3%.

Racial composition as of the 2020 census
Race	Number	Percent
White	6,131	92.8%
Black or African American	80	1.2%
American Indian and Alaska Native	14	0.2%
Asian	23	0.3%
Native Hawaiian and Other Pacific Islander	3	0.0%
Some other race	84	1.3%
Two or more races	273	4.1%
Hispanic or Latino (of any race)	227	3.4%

=== 2010 census ===
As of the census of 2010, there were 6,728 people, 2,656 households, and 1,667 families living in the city. The population density was 1,016.3 inhabitants per square mile (392.4/km^{2}). There were 2,948 housing units at an average density of 445.3 per square mile (171.9/km^{2}). The racial makeup of the city was 95.0% White, 1.5% African American, 0.2% Native American, 0.4% Asian, 1.2% from other races, and 1.7% from two or more races. Hispanic or Latino of any race were 2.4% of the population.

There were 2,656 households, of which 35.8% had children under the age of 18 living with them, 39.9% were married couples living together, 17.0% had a female householder with no husband present, 5.9% had a male householder with no wife present, and 37.2% were non-families. 31.1% of all households were made up of individuals, and 12.4% had someone living alone who was 65 years of age or older. The average household size was 2.43 and the average family size was 3.01.

The median age in the city was 35.6 years. 26.5% of residents were under the age of 18; 9.7% were between the ages of 18 and 24; 26.3% were from 25 to 44; 23.4% were from 45 to 64; and 14.1% were 65 years of age or older. The gender makeup of the city was 47.8% male and 52.2% female.

=== 2000 census ===
As of the census of 2000, there were 6,515 people, 2,665 households, and 1,684 families living in the city. The population density was 1,484.4 inhabitants per square mile (573.1/km^{2}). There were 2,892 housing units at an average density of 658.9 per square mile (254.4/km^{2}). The racial makeup of the city was 96.47% White, 1.49% African American, 0.20% Native American, 0.40% Asian, 0.28% from other races, and 1.17% from two or more races. Hispanic or Latino of any race were 1.04% of the population.

There were 2,665 households, out of which 33.1% had children under the age of 18 living with them, 44.9% were married couples living together, 13.6% had a female householder with no husband present, and 36.8% were non-families. 32.0% of all households were made up of individuals, and 13.8% had someone living alone who was 65 years of age or older. The average household size was 2.39 and the average family size was 3.01.

In the city, the population was spread out, with 27.5% under the age of 18, 10.1% from 18 to 24, 28.1% from 25 to 44, 19.3% from 45 to 64, and 15.0% who were 65 years of age or older. The median age was 34 years. For every 100 females, there were 84.9 males. For every 100 females age 18 and over, there were 82.4 males.

The median income for a household in the city was $34,244, and the median income for a family was $41,020. Males had a median income of $31,173 versus $21,137 for females. The per capita income for the city was $16,836. About 7.6% of families and 11.8% of the population were below the poverty line, including 15.5% of those under age 18 and 14.8% of those age 65 or over.

== Economy ==
Manufacturing and distribution are central to North Vernon's economy. Major employers in the North Vernon area include a Lowe's distribution center, the auto-parts manufacturers American Axle & Manufacturing and Martinrea International, the plastics makers Hilex Poly and Decatur Plastic Products, Decatur Mold, and North Vernon Industry Corporation, a gray-iron foundry established in 1996.

== Government ==
North Vernon is governed by an elected mayor and a common council. As of 2024, the mayor is Shawn Gerkin.

== Education ==
Public education in North Vernon is provided by the countywide Jennings County School Corporation, whose Jennings County High School is located in the city. North Vernon also has a branch of the Jennings County Public Library.

== Transportation ==
North Vernon originated as a railroad junction and remains a rail crossing. The east–west line through the city—built as the Ohio and Mississippi Railroad and later part of the Baltimore and Ohio Railroad—is now CSX's Indiana Subdivision between Cincinnati and Washington, Indiana. The north–south line is the Madison Railroad, a short line operated by the City of Madison Port Authority that runs the surviving segment of the Madison and Indianapolis Railroad—begun in 1836 as Indiana's first railroad—and ends at its diamond crossing with the CSX line in North Vernon.

U.S. Route 50 passes the city on a bypass completed in two phases in 2013 and 2017; Indiana State Road 3 and Indiana State Road 7 also serve North Vernon. The city is served by the North Vernon Airport, a former United States Army Air Forces auxiliary field (St. Anne Field) that was turned over to the city in 1948.

== Notable people ==
- Royce Campbell, jazz guitarist and member of the Henry Mancini orchestra
- Scott Earl, baseball player
- Albert Gumble, composer, songwriter, and pianist
- Pat O'Connor, racing driver
- Jared Thomas, racing driver
