= Vernon, Indiana =

- Town
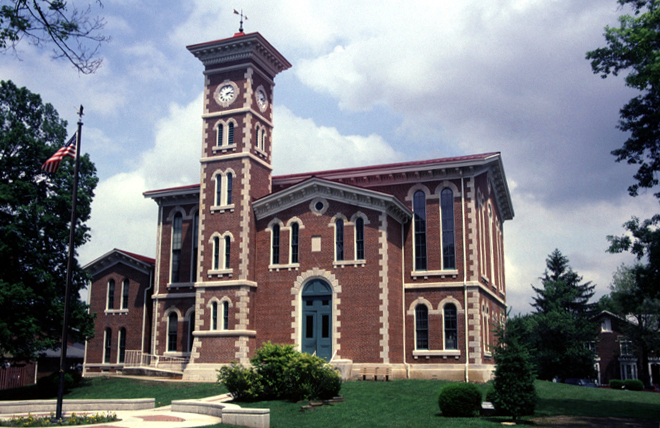
- Jennings County courthouse in Vernon

- Location of Vernon in Jennings County, Indiana.
- Coordinates: 38°59′07″N 85°36′36″W
- Country: United States
- State: Indiana
- County: Jennings
- Township: Vernon

Area
  - Total: 0.21 sq mi (0.54 km^{2})
  - Land: 0.21 sq mi (0.54 km^{2})
  - Water: 0 sq mi (0.00 km^{2})
- Elevation: 659 ft (201 m)

Population (2020)
  - Total: 236
  - Density: 1,139.0/sq mi (439.78/km^{2})
- Time zone: UTC-5 (Eastern (EST))
  - Summer (DST): UTC-4 (EDT)
- ZIP code: 47282
- Area code: 812
- FIPS code: 18-78902
- GNIS feature ID: 2397713
- Website: www.vernonindiana.org

Vernon is a town within Vernon Township and the county seat of Jennings County, Indiana, United States. With a population of just 236 in the 2020 census, it is the smallest county seat by population in the state of Indiana, lying just south of the much larger North Vernon. It sits on a peninsula as it is nearly surrounded by the Muscatatuck River. Vernon is the only Indiana town with an elected mayor and an elected town marshal. As of 2025, Bradley Bender is the mayor and Britt Burgmeier is the marshal.

The Vernon Historic District is on the National Register of Historic Places and is the site of many firsts in the state.

- The first area set aside for use as a public playground in Indiana, The Commons
- The first elevated railroad overpass west of the Alleghenies
- The first all women's jury in Indiana
- The first Disciples of Christ church in Indiana

It was also the home of Indiana's fourth state park, now called Muscatatuck County Park.

== History ==
Vernon was named after Mount Vernon, George Washington's plantation estate in Virginia. The Vernon post office was established in 1817.

Vernon was the site of a near-battle on July 11, 1863, during Morgan's Raid in the American Civil War. John Hunt Morgan, targeting the Ohio and Mississippi Railroad, demanded the surrender of the town, which was defended by 100 local militia in strong positions on hills and bluffs overlooking the Muscatatuck River and 178 Union troops under the command of Colonel Hugh Williams. The defenders successfully stalled Morgan by demanding time to consider surrender, and then requesting time for the evacuation of women and children, until 1,000 Union troops under the command of Brigadier General John Love could arrive from Seymour. Major General Lew Wallace also arrived later to take command of the entire Union force converging on Vernon. Morgan ultimately retreated south toward Dupont, Indiana, rather than risk a confrontation.

== Geography ==
According to the 2010 census, Vernon has a total area of 0.24 square miles (0.62 km^{2}), all land.

== Demographics ==
Historical population
Census	Pop.	Note	%±
1850	690		—
1860	630		−8.7%
1870	673		6.8%
1880	616		−8.5%
1890	613		−0.5%
1900	557		−9.1%
1910	453		−18.7%
1920	423		−6.6%
1930	410		−3.1%
1940	413		0.7%
1950	480		16.2%
1960	461		−4.0%
1970	440		−4.6%
1980	329		−25.2%
1990	370		12.5%
2000	330		−10.8%
2010	318		−3.6%
2020	236		−25.8%
U.S. Decennial Census

=== 2010 census ===
As of the census of 2010, there were 318 people, 134 households, and 84 families living in the town. The population density was 1,325.0 inhabitants per square mile (511.6/km^{2}). There were 167 housing units at an average density of 695.8 per square mile (268.6/km^{2}). The racial makeup of the town was 97.5% White, 0.3% African American, 0.3% Asian, 0.3% from other races, and 1.6% from two or more races. Hispanic or Latino of any race were 0.6% of the population.

There were 134 households, of which 35.1% had children under the age of 18 living with them, 46.3% were married couples living together, 12.7% had a female householder with no husband present, 3.7% had a male householder with no wife present, and 37.3% were non-families. 32.8% of all households were made up of individuals, and 11.1% had someone living alone who was 65 years of age or older. The average household size was 2.37 and the average family size was 2.92.

The median age in the town was 39.3 years. 26.4% of residents were under the age of 18; 7.2% were between the ages of 18 and 24; 25.5% were from 25 to 44; 27% were from 45 to 64; and 13.8% were 65 years of age or older. The gender makeup of the town was 48.1% male and 51.9% female.

=== 2000 census ===
As of the census of 2000, there were 330 people, 117 households, and 80 families living in the town. The population density was 1,383.2 inhabitants per square mile (534.1/km^{2}). There were 139 housing units at an average density of 582.6 per square mile (224.9/km^{2}). The racial makeup of the town was 98.48% White, 0.91% African American, 0.30% Native American and 0.30% Asian.

There were 117 households, out of which 32.5% had children under the age of 18 living with them, 49.6% were married couples living together, 15.4% had a female householder with no husband present, and 31.6% were non-families. 27.4% of all households were made up of individuals, and 14.5% had someone living alone who was 65 years of age or older. The average household size was 2.40 and the average family size was 2.83.

In the town, the population was spread out, with 20.9% under the age of 18, 11.5% from 18 to 24, 33.6% from 25 to 44, 19.7% from 45 to 64, and 14.2% who were 65 years of age or older. The median age was 35 years. For every 100 females, there were 124.5 males. For every 100 females age 18 and over, there were 123.1 males.

The median income for a household in the town was $29,750, and the median income for a family was $36,875. Males had a median income of $28,333 versus $22,143 for females. The per capita income for the town was $17,367. About 5.2% of families and 9.5% of the population were below the poverty line, including 18.1% of those under age 18 and 4.3% of those age 65 or over.

== Notable people ==
- Sarah T. Bolton, pioneer poet
- Ovid Butler, founder of Butler University
- Lincoln Dixon, a member of the U.S. Congress
- William Forsyth, artist
- General Robert Sanford Foster, officer in the Civil War
- John C. New, Treasurer of the United States, U.S. Consul General to Great Britain and publisher of the Indianapolis Journal
- Horatio C. Newcomb, mayor of Indianapolis
- Theodore Steele, artist
- Jessamyn West, writer

Famous people who visited and lived in Vernon include: Alexander Campbell, founder of the Christian Church and Bethany College; Henry Ward Beecher, who came to Vernon early in the Civil War and made a plea for Lincoln and the Union at the Courthouse; and Lord Flanigan, English nobleman, who was at one time a citizen of Vernon. Richard Nixon spoke in front of the courthouse in Vernon on June 24, 1971, for the dedication of a plaque commemorating the birthplace of his mother, Hannah Milhous Nixon.

== Literature ==
The 1945 novel The Friendly Persuasion by Jessamyn West and its 1956 Oscar-nominated and Palme d'Or winning adaption, starring Gary Cooper, are set in and around Vernon during the Civil War.
