= Hilltown, Indiana =

- Unincorporated town
- Location within Indiana Location within the United States
- Coordinates: 38°50′13″N 85°39′44″W
- Country: United States
- State: Indiana
- County: Jennings
- Township: Montgomery
- Elevation: 650 ft (200 m)
- ZIP code: 47270
- FIPS code: 18-33988
- GNIS feature ID: 436227

Hilltown is an unincorporated town in Montgomery Township, Jennings County, Indiana.

Hilltown was settled prior to Indiana becoming a state, around 1810. The Coffee Creek Baptist Church, the Coffee Creek School, a high school, and two cemeteries were located in the community. By 1914, the community was reported as dwindling.

== Geography ==
Hilltown is located west of Paris Crossing. It is in Montgomery Township.

== History ==
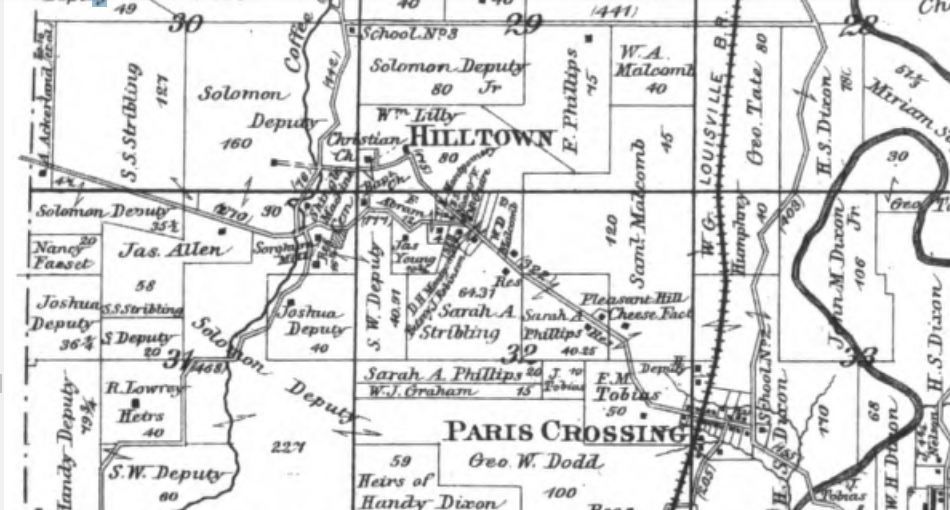
Hilltown, Indiana and Paris Crossing, Indiana

The area around Coffee Creek was first settled by the Solomon Deputy family, in what would become southern Jennings County, in 1810. At the time, Indiana had not yet become a state, and the area was still part of Indiana Territory, recently formed from the mostly unsettled Northwest Territory.

Thomas Hill Sr., a transplant from Kentucky, came to the area in 1817; he brought several family members with him. In 1822, the family founded the Coffee Creek Baptist Church. This church was west of the future community of Paris Crossing, near where the Baptist cemeteries in Hilltown are today. Later, the Baptist Church was moved into Paris Crossing. Members of the Hill family were born in and around Paris and Hilltown. In 1822, a log-hewn building was constructed in Hilltown; this building served as both a church and school. Among the schoolteachers were Benjamin Gaddy, James Graham, John Compton, Jonathan Carpenter, Horace Bacon, Dan Roberts, Robert Cashaw, and J.W. Hill.

In 1858, a frame school was built in Hilltown. This was known as the Coffee Creek School, located in Hilltown. In 1851, a high school was built across the road. The school was moved to Paris Crossing. In 1879, the road between Paris Crossing and Hilltown was graded.

The community of Hilltown appears in the 1884 Atlas of Jennings County, Indiana; it was in sections 29, 30, 31, and 32 of Montgomery Township, adjacent to Paris Crossing and near Commiskey. Among the buildings were a sorghum mill, two churches, and a cemetery.

A 1914 article gives some of the history of the community: "West of this prehistoric town [Paris] was Hilltown, which was in two divisions, as it were, one part west and [the] other part on [the] east side of Coffee Creek. Both divisions had stores, shops and other enterprises, and all were prosperous. Today Evolution, by his hand of changing conditions, has completely removed the business houses and shops from the once noted Hilltown, and with the town went the Old Baptist Church." Hilltown was slowly vacated over what one author stated was "three quarters of a century"

The Coffee Creek Cemetery is located in Hilltown.

== See also ==
- Queensville, Indiana
