= Retreat =

Retreat or re-treat may refer to:

== Common uses ==
- Retreat (bugle call), a military signal for the end of day, known as "Sunset" in some countries
- Retreat (military), a withdrawal of military forces
- Retreat (spiritual), a time taken to reflect or meditate
- Retreat (social), group co-travel experience such as remote work business employees meeting or working vacation with friends
- Retreat (survivalism), a place of refuge for survivalists

== Film and television ==
- Retreat (2011 film), a film starring Cillian Murphy, Jamie Bell, and Thandiwe Newton
- Retreat (2025 film), a British thriller film
- Retreat (2013 film), a short film featuring Sophie Stone
- Retreat, the working title of A Murder at the End of the World, a 2023 American murder-mystery miniseries

== Music ==
- "Retreat (Cries My Heart)", a 1952 song written by Nancy Farnsworth, Tommy Furtado, and Anita Boyer
- Retreat, a 2009 album by Vessels
- "Retreat", a 2003 song by Hell Is for Heroes from The Neon Handshake
- "Retreat", a 2005 song by the Rakes from Capture/Release

== Places and structures ==
=== Antarctica ===
- Retreat Hills, Victoria Land

=== Australia ===
- Retreat, Tasmania, a small rural locality
- Retreat River, New South Wales

=== Ireland ===
- Retreat, County Westmeath, a townland

=== South Africa ===
- Retreat, Cape Town, a suburb
  - Retreat railway station

=== United States ===
- Retreat, Indiana, an unincorporated community
- Retreat, Louisiana, an unincorporated community
- Retreat (Port Tobacco, Maryland), a historic building
- Retreat, New Jersey, an unincorporated community
- Retreat, Texas, a town near Corsicana
- Retreat, Wisconsin, an unincorporated community

== Other uses ==
- Retreat (1801 ship), a West Indiaman
- "Retreat" (Buffy the Vampire Slayer), a 2009 comics story arc

== See also ==
- The Retreat (disambiguation)
- Treat (disambiguation)
