= Walnut Ridge =

Walnut Ridge may refer to the following places in the United States:

- Walnut Ridge, Arkansas
- Walnut Ridge, Indiana
- Walnut Ridge (Amtrak station), a train station in Walnut Ridge, Arkansas
- Walnut Ridge High School (disambiguation), multiple high schools
