= Rebecca Hammond Lard =

American poet

Rebecca Hammond Lard (Laird)
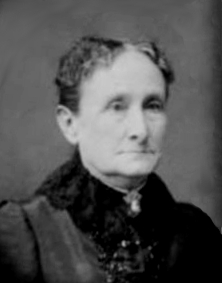
- Born: Rebecca Hammond; March 7, 1772; New Bedford, Massachusetts
- Died: 28 September 1855 (aged 83); Paris Crossing, Indiana
- Resting place: Coffee Creek Baptist Church Cemetery
- Occupations: School Teacher, Poet
- Spouse(s): Samuel Lard (Laird) (m. 1801-1828; divorced)
- Children: 4

Rebecca Hammond Lard (Laird) (born Rebecca Hammond; March 7, 1772 – September 28, 1855), is called by some critics "the first poet in Indiana". Her poetry reflects on the lives of the early people in Indiana and the colonists in Vermont. Lard's works are mainly religious and meditative in tone, but draw their inspiration in part from the Bucolics and Georgics of Virgil. She is best known for Indiana's first book of poetry, On the Banks of the Ohio, a poem she is believed to have written.

== Life and work ==
=== Early life ===
Rebecca (sometimes Rebekah) Lard (Laird) was born on March 7, 1772, in New Bedford, Massachusetts, to parents Jabez and Priscilla (Delano) Hammond. The following month, she was baptized at Mattapoisett in Rochester, Massachusetts. Lard was the oldest of ten children. At age ten, Rebecca moved with her father's family from Rochester to Woodstock, Vermont. On her mother's side of the family, her great-grandmother was sister to William Penn.

At the age of fourteen Rebecca began to teach at a school; she became a teacher despite a lack of schooling herself but relied on her own talents. Her brother, Jabez Delano Hammond, followed in her footsteps and began teaching at the age of fifteen, eight years later. Hammond continued to read and practice medicine in Reading, Vermont, and also to read and practice law in Cherry Valley, New York, where he was elected a member of Congress. Rebecca would later dedicate her first book to this brother.

=== Family ===
Rebecca Hammond married Samuel Laird on February 12, 1801, in Woodstock, Vermont and had four children. She continued to teach, being her chief occupation there. About 1807 Samuel moved the Laird family to Hancock, Vermont, and from there to Cherry Valley, New York, where her brother was living at that time. From there, Samuel decided to migrate to Indiana.

Rebecca refused to join him, taking her children back to Vermont to be with her own family, instead. Marcus Davis Gilman said of her, "Her life struggle appears to have been a severe one, having a family of four children dependent upon her for support from their childhood, but bravely did she triumph over all obstacles".

Samuel Laird filed land entry papers in 1815 for 160 acres in Montgomery Township, Jennings County, Indiana. Their son, Samuel Jr., joined his father in 1817. They made a permanent home there on Graham Creek. In 1819, Samuel Jr. returned to convince his mother to bring the family west.

At some unknown date, prior to the birth of their children, Samuel changed the spelling of his surname to LAIRD from LARD. All of their children and descendants carry the name of LAIRD.

=== Poetry ===
The power that form’d the hills and spread the plain
And bade the rivers roll towards the main
By the same fiat gave this clime to rise
And bloom in splendour ‘neath the western skies
Crown’d with his richest gifts this favour’d land'
And pour’d his bounties with unsparing hand

Then beasts of prey here found a resting place
And savage men delighted in the chase.
No cultering hand improv’d the fertile soil
But herbs and flowers in wild confusion lay
And trees umbrageous veil’d the noontide ray.

— from "On the Banks of the Ohio."

Rebecca's first collection of 143 pages of poetry, Miscellaneous Poems by a Lady, was first published by David Watson of Woodstock in 1820 as Miscellaneous Poems on Moral and Religious Subjects by a Lady. She dedicated this work to her brother, Jabez Delano Hammond. In these poems, she talks about beauty, death, and feeling by comparing them to phenomena in nature.

Rebecca's twelve-page poem, On the Banks of the Ohio, was published in 1823 as a booklet and was featured widely by many magazines and papers. This is recorded as Indiana's first published poetry. In this poem, Rebecca talks about the area's landscape and the beauty of undisturbed nature. She also describes the native people as dangerous.

An old edition of Rebecca's five-page volume of verse is maintained in the collection of the Historical and Philosophical Society of Ohio, Cincinnati, and an undated clipping of the Cincinnati Gazette identifies the work as that of Mrs. Lard, "a lady of Indiana".

=== Divorce and death ===
Rebecca left Montgomery township in 1823 to become a school teacher in Vernon, Indiana. A cabin was built there by John Vawter to serve as the area's schoolhouse and board Mrs. Laird as a means of payment. She was one of the first women school teachers in Jennings county and taught some of the best minds in Indiana. Among her students were Squire Billy Deputy's children.

In 1826, Samuel started divorce proceedings against Rebecca for not returning after leaving him. He was granted a divorce on March 4, 1828, in the Jennings County court. Rebecca later left the Vernon area of Jennings county and returned south. She started teaching at Solomon's Temple by Coffee Creek.

Rebecca Laird died on September 28, 1855, and is buried at the Coffee Creek Baptist Church Cemetery in Paris Crossing, Indiana. The epitaph on her tombstone reads: "she has done what she could".

== Works ==
- Miscellaneous Poems on Moral and Religious Subjects (1820)
- The Banks of the Ohio (1823)
