= Country Squire Lakes, Indiana =

- Census-designated place
- Location within Indiana Location within the United States
- Coordinates: 39°02′17″N 85°41′06″W
- Country: United States
- State: Indiana
- County: Jennings
- Township: Geneva

Area
  - Total: 2.70 sq mi (6.99 km^{2})
  - Land: 2.56 sq mi (6.63 km^{2})
  - Water: 0.14 sq mi (0.36 km^{2})
- Elevation: 682 ft (208 m)

Population (2020)
  - Total: 3,558
  - Density: 1,390.9/sq mi (537.02/km^{2})
- ZIP code: 47265 (North Vernon, IN)
- GNIS feature ID: 2629850
- FIPS code: 18-15409

Country Squire Lakes is an unincorporated community and census-designated place (CDP) in Geneva Township, Jennings County, Indiana, United States. As of the 2020 census, Country Squire Lakes had a population of 3,558.

It was founded in 1973 by a property developer as a planned community built around several artificial lakes.

== Geography ==
The community is in northwestern Jennings County, it is in the southeast corner of Geneva Township. It is built around Country Squire Lake, a reservoir on Six mile Creek, as well as several smaller lakes. The lakes in the western part of the community drain to Mutton Creek. Six mile and Mutton Creeks are southwest-flowing tributaries of the Vernon Fork of the Muscatatuck River and part of the White River watershed.

Indiana State Road 7 runs along the northeast edge of the community, leading southeast 3 miles (5 km) to North Vernon and northwest 18 miles (29 km) to Columbus. The older community of Queensville borders Country Squire Lakes to the northeast across Highway 7.

According to the U.S. Census Bureau, the Country Squire Lakes CDP has a total area of 2.7 square miles (7.0 km^{2}), of which 2.5 square miles (6.6 km^{2}) are land and 0.2 square miles (0.4 km^{2}), or 5.16%, are water.

== Demographics ==
Historical population
Census	Pop.	Note	%±
2020	3,558		—
U.S. Decennial Census

=== 2020 census ===
As of the 2020 census, Country Squire Lakes had a population of 3,558. The median age was 33.3 years. 28.8% of residents were under the age of 18 and 10.8% of residents were 65 years of age or older. For every 100 females there were 100.5 males, and for every 100 females age 18 and over there were 100.6 males age 18 and over.

0.0% of residents lived in urban areas, while 100.0% lived in rural areas.

There were 1,229 households in Country Squire Lakes, of which 37.0% had children under the age of 18 living in them. Of all households, 39.4% were married-couple households, 20.5% were households with a male householder and no spouse or partner present, and 25.7% were households with a female householder and no spouse or partner present. About 22.8% of all households were made up of individuals and 9.9% had someone living alone who was 65 years of age or older.

There were 1,422 housing units, of which 13.6% were vacant. The homeowner vacancy rate was 3.2% and the rental vacancy rate was 13.1%.

Racial composition as of the 2020 census
Race	Number	Percent
White	3,054	85.8%
Black or African American	23	0.6%
American Indian and Alaska Native	26	0.7%
Asian	0	0.0%
Native Hawaiian and Other Pacific Islander	0	0.0%
Some other race	220	6.2%
Two or more races	235	6.6%
Hispanic or Latino (of any race)	373	10.5%
