= Jennings County, Indiana =

County in Indiana, United States

- County
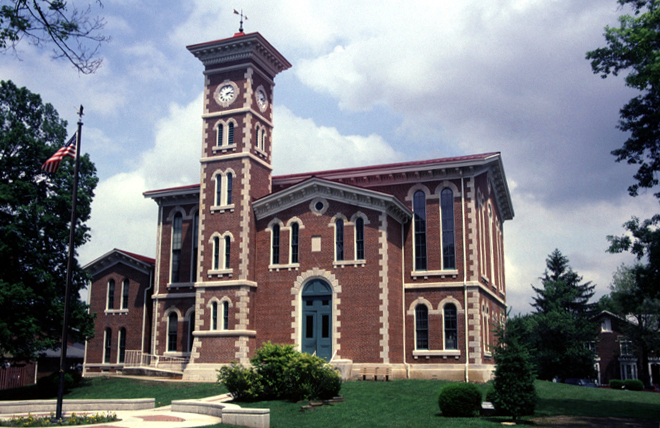
- Jennings County Courthouse in Vernon, Indiana

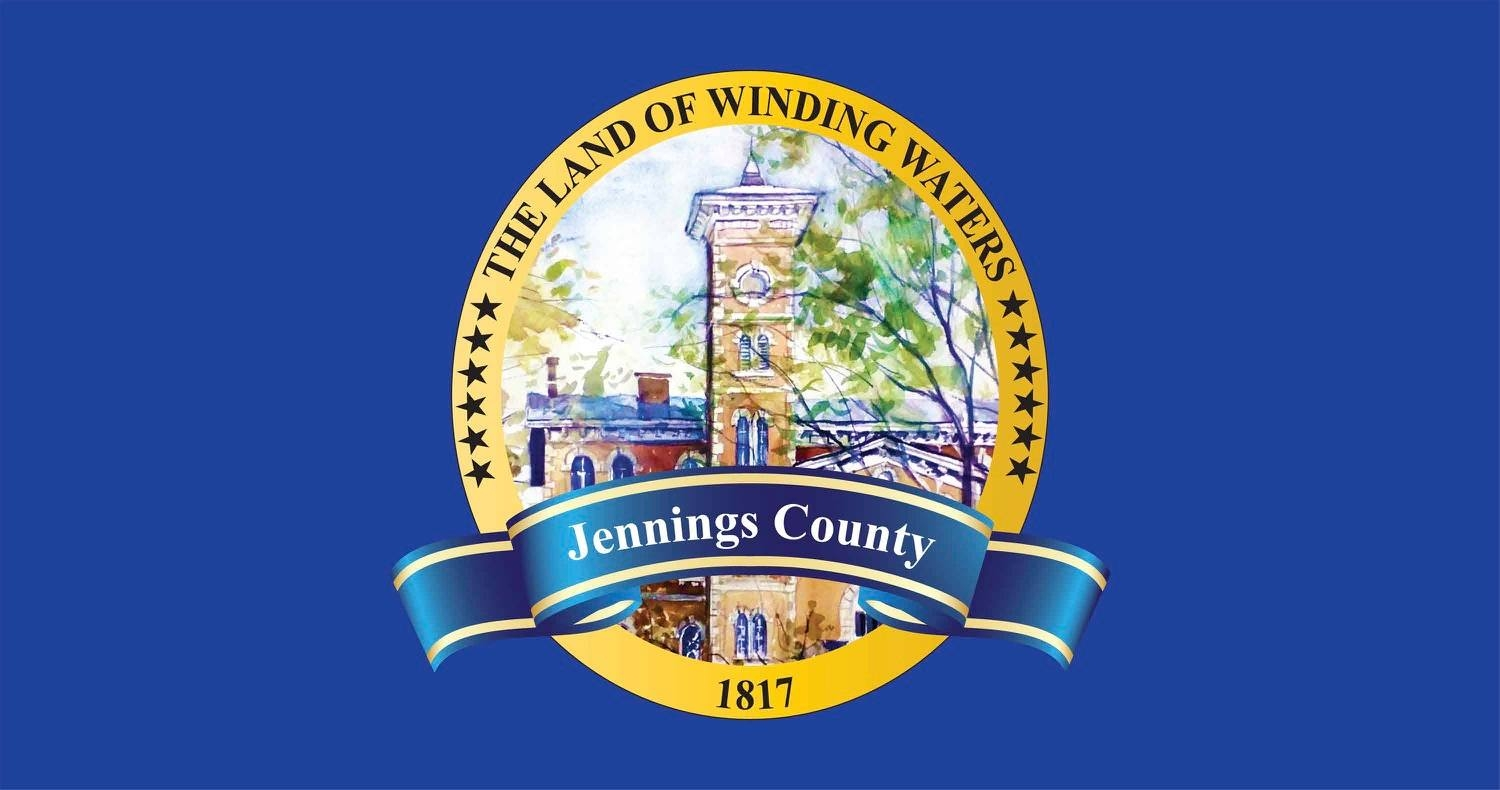
- Flag

- Location within the U.S. state of Indiana
- Coordinates: 39°00′N 85°38′W
- Country: United States
- State: Indiana
- Founded: 1817
- Named for: Jonathan Jennings
- Seat: Vernon
- Largest city: North Vernon

Area
  - Total: 378.34 sq mi (979.9 km^{2})
  - Land: 376.58 sq mi (975.3 km^{2})
  - Water: 1.76 sq mi (4.6 km^{2}) 0.47%

Population (2020)
  - Total: 27,613
  - Estimate (2025): 27,622 ▲
  - Density: 73.326/sq mi (28.311/km^{2})
- Time zone: UTC−5 (Eastern)
  - Summer (DST): UTC−4 (EDT)
- Congressional district: 6th
- Website: https://jenningscounty-in.gov/
- Indiana county number 40

Jennings County is a county located in the U.S. state of Indiana. As of 2020, the population was 27,613. The county seat is Vernon.

== History ==
Jennings County was formed in 1817. It was named for the first Governor of Indiana and a nine-term congressman, Jonathan Jennings. Jennings was governor when the county was organized.

== Geography ==
According to the 2010 census, the county has a total area of 378.34 square miles (979.9 km^{2}), of which 376.58 square miles (975.3 km^{2}) (or 99.53%) is land and 1.76 square miles (4.6 km^{2}) (or 0.47%) is water. It is a rural county, with majority of the county consisting of personal farms and woodlands. There are only two incorporated towns in this county, Vernon, the county seat, and North Vernon. Both are quite small and underdeveloped by urban standards. The county is located in the center of an imaginary triangle consisting of Indianapolis, IN, Cincinnati, OH, and Louisville, KY and requires only 1 1/4 hour drive time to any of these urban centers.

It is also home to the Muscatatuck Urban Training Center, located just outside North Vernon, at which various training exercises and scenarios are conducted for homeland security and other similar purposes.

=== City ===
- North Vernon

=== Town ===
- Vernon

=== Census-designated places ===
- Butlerville
- Country Squire Lakes
- Hayden
- Scipio

=== Other unincorporated places ===
- Brewersville
- Commiskey
- Four Corners
- Grayford
- Hilltown
- Lovett
- Nebraska
- Paris
- Paris Crossing
- Queensville
- San Jacinto
- Walnut Ridge
- Zenas

=== Townships ===
- Bigger
- Campbell
- Center
- Columbia
- Geneva
- Lovett
- Marion
- Montgomery
- Sand Creek
- Spencer
- Vernon

=== Adjacent counties ===
- Decatur County (north)
- Ripley County (east)
- Jefferson County (southeast)
- Scott County (south)
- Jackson County (west)
- Bartholomew County (northwest)

=== Major highways ===
Sources: National Atlas, U.S. Census Bureau

- U.S. Route 50
- State Road 3
- State Road 7
- State Road 250

=== Parks and protected areas ===
- Big Oaks National Wildlife Refuge (part)
- Muscatatuck National Wildlife Refuge (part)
- Muscatatuck County Park
- Selmier State Forest

== Climate and weather ==
Vernon, Indiana

Climate chart (precipitation, max. and min. temperature)
J	F	M	A	M	J	J	A	S	O	N	D
3 38 22	2.7 45 26	3.8 55 34	4.4 66 43	4.7 75 52	3.8 83 61	4.4 86 65	4.4 84 63	2.9 78 56	3.2 67 44	3.8 54 36	3.4 43 27
- █ Average max. and min. temperatures in °F
- █ Precipitation totals in inches
- Source: The Weather Channel
Metric conversion
J	F	M	A	M	J	J	A	S	O	N	D
75 3 −6	69 7 −3	96 13 1	111 19 6	120 24 11	97 28 16	112 30 18	112 29 17	73 26 13	81 19 7	97 12 2	86 6 −3
- █ Average max. and min. temperatures in °C
- █ Precipitation totals in mm

In recent years, average temperatures in Vernon have ranged from a low of 22 °F (−6 °C) in January to a high of 86 °F (30 °C) in July, although a record low of −24 °F (−31 °C) was recorded in January 1977 and a record high of 105 °F (41 °C) was recorded in July 1954. Average monthly precipitation ranged from 2.71 inches (69 mm) in February to 4.72 inches (120 mm) in May.

== Government ==
The county government is a constitutional body, and is granted specific powers by the Constitution of Indiana, and by the Indiana Code.

County Council: The county council is the legislative branch of the county government and controls all the spending and revenue collection in the county. Representatives are elected from county districts. The council members serve four-year terms. They are responsible for setting salaries, the annual budget, and special spending. The council also has limited authority to impose local taxes, in the form of an income and property tax that is subject to state level approval, excise taxes, and service taxes.

Board of Commissioners: The executive body of the county is made of a board of commissioners. The commissioners are elected county-wide, in staggered terms, and each serves a four-year term. One of the commissioners, typically the most senior, serves as president. The commissioners are charged with executing the acts legislated by the council, collecting revenue, and managing the day-to-day functions of the county government.

Court: The county maintains a small claims court that can handle some civil cases. The judge on the court is elected to a term of four years and must be a member of the Indiana Bar Association. The judge is assisted by a constable who is also elected to a four-year term. In some cases, court decisions can be appealed to the state level circuit court.

County Officials: The county has several other elected offices, including sheriff, coroner, auditor, treasurer, recorder, surveyor, and circuit court clerk Each of these elected officers serves a term of four years and oversees a different part of county government. Members elected to county government positions are required to declare party affiliations and to be residents of the county.

Jennings County is part of Indiana's 6th congressional district and is represented in Congress by Republican Greg Pence. It is also part of Indiana Senate districts 43 and 45 and Indiana House of Representatives districts 66 and 69.

Jennings County is, and has historically been, a Republican county and in the top 5 highest taxed counties in the state. Democratic presidential candidates have won Jennings County only thrice in the past 130 years.

United States presidential election results for Jennings County, Indiana
Year	Republican		Democratic		Third party(ies)	
Year	No.	%	No.	%	No.	%
1888	2,057	55.55%	1,598	43.15%	48	1.30%
1892	1,785	49.61%	1,381	38.38%	432	12.01%
1896	2,040	52.00%	1,850	47.16%	33	0.84%
1900	2,155	51.84%	1,925	46.31%	77	1.85%
1904	2,139	54.26%	1,688	42.82%	115	2.92%
1908	2,100	51.23%	1,871	45.65%	128	3.12%
1912	955	27.06%	1,577	44.69%	997	28.25%
1916	1,791	50.01%	1,686	47.08%	104	2.90%
1920	3,404	55.65%	2,603	42.55%	110	1.80%
1924	3,506	54.41%	2,730	42.36%	208	3.23%
1928	3,705	60.76%	2,369	38.85%	24	0.39%
1932	3,020	44.96%	3,603	53.64%	94	1.40%
1936	3,594	52.67%	3,157	46.27%	72	1.06%
1940	3,921	56.51%	2,989	43.08%	29	0.42%
1944	3,643	58.58%	2,537	40.79%	39	0.63%
1948	3,485	52.52%	3,084	46.47%	67	1.01%
1952	4,460	61.21%	2,777	38.11%	49	0.67%
1956	4,502	60.72%	2,879	38.83%	33	0.45%
1960	4,478	56.63%	3,403	43.03%	27	0.34%
1964	3,469	44.41%	4,307	55.14%	35	0.45%
1968	4,416	51.11%	2,996	34.68%	1,228	14.21%
1972	5,156	63.21%	2,903	35.59%	98	1.20%
1976	4,505	49.99%	4,430	49.16%	77	0.85%
1980	5,498	55.98%	3,931	40.02%	393	4.00%
1984	6,356	65.48%	3,264	33.63%	87	0.90%
1988	5,636	60.29%	3,667	39.23%	45	0.48%
1992	4,392	42.66%	3,471	33.72%	2,432	23.62%
1996	4,461	42.81%	4,223	40.53%	1,736	16.66%
2000	5,732	60.37%	3,549	37.38%	213	2.24%
2004	6,864	65.27%	3,538	33.64%	115	1.09%
2008	6,261	52.88%	5,312	44.87%	266	2.25%
2012	6,120	59.71%	3,821	37.28%	309	3.01%
2016	8,224	73.23%	2,364	21.05%	643	5.73%
2020	9,490	77.29%	2,523	20.55%	265	2.16%
2024	9,273	78.52%	2,328	19.71%	208	1.76%

== Demographics ==
Historical population
Census	Pop.	Note	%±
1820	2,000		—
1830	3,974		98.7%
1840	8,829		122.2%
1850	12,096		37.0%
1860	14,749		21.9%
1870	16,218		10.0%
1880	16,453		1.4%
1890	14,608		−11.2%
1900	15,757		7.9%
1910	14,203		−9.9%
1920	13,280		−6.5%
1930	11,800		−11.1%
1940	13,680		15.9%
1950	15,250		11.5%
1960	17,267		13.2%
1970	19,454		12.7%
1980	22,854		17.5%
1990	23,661		3.5%
2000	27,554		16.5%
2010	28,525		3.5%
2020	27,613		−3.2%
2025 (est.)	27,622	▲	0.0%
U.S. Decennial Census; 1790-1960 1900-1990; 1990-2000 2010

=== Racial and ethnic composition ===
Jennings County, Indiana – Racial and ethnic composition Note: the US Census treats Hispanic/Latino as an ethnic category. This table excludes Latinos from the racial categories and assigns them to a separate category. Hispanics/Latinos may be of any race.
Race / Ethnicity (NH = Non-Hispanic)	Pop 1980	Pop 1990	Pop 2000	Pop 2010	Pop 2020	% 1980	% 1990	% 2000	% 2010	% 2020
White alone (NH)	22,499	23,279	26,745	27,361	25,665	98.45%	98.39%	97.06%	95.92%	92.95%
Black or African American alone (NH)	197	207	205	206	175	0.86%	0.87%	0.74%	0.72%	0.63%
Native American or Alaska Native alone (NH)	13	30	57	30	39	0.06%	0.13%	0.21%	0.11%	0.14%
Asian alone (NH)	35	51	68	62	49	0.15%	0.22%	0.25%	0.22%	0.18%
Native Hawaiian or Pacific Islander alone (NH)	x	x	1	0	2	x	x	0.00%	0.00%	0.01%
Other race alone (NH)	13	4	16	12	44	0.06%	0.02%	0.06%	0.04%	0.16%
Mixed race or Multiracial (NH)	x	x	269	283	780	x	x	0.98%	0.99%	2.82%
Hispanic or Latino (any race)	97	90	193	571	859	0.42%	0.38%	0.70%	2.00%	3.11%
Total	22,854	23,661	27,554	28,525	27,613	100.00%	100.00%	100.00%	100.00%	100.00%

=== 2020 census ===
As of the 2020 census, the county had a population of 27,613. The median age was 40.4 years. 23.8% of residents were under the age of 18 and 16.7% of residents were 65 years of age or older. For every 100 females there were 100.1 males, and for every 100 females age 18 and over there were 100.2 males age 18 and over.

The racial makeup of the county was 93.7% White, 0.6% Black or African American, 0.3% American Indian and Alaska Native, 0.2% Asian, <0.1% Native Hawaiian and Pacific Islander, 1.5% from some other race, and 3.7% from two or more races. Hispanic or Latino residents of any race comprised 3.1% of the population.

25.1% of residents lived in urban areas, while 74.9% lived in rural areas.

There were 10,582 households in the county, of which 31.7% had children under the age of 18 living in them. Of all households, 50.0% were married-couple households, 18.9% were households with a male householder and no spouse or partner present, and 21.9% were households with a female householder and no spouse or partner present. About 24.6% of all households were made up of individuals and 10.7% had someone living alone who was 65 years of age or older.

There were 11,574 housing units, of which 8.6% were vacant. Among occupied housing units, 76.6% were owner-occupied and 23.4% were renter-occupied. The homeowner vacancy rate was 1.4% and the rental vacancy rate was 6.1%.

=== 2010 census ===
As of the 2010 United States census, there were 28,525 people, 10,680 households, and 7,733 families residing in the county. The population density was 75.7 inhabitants per square mile (29.2/km^{2}). There were 12,069 housing units at an average density of 32.0 per square mile (12.4/km^{2}). The racial makeup of the county was 96.8% white, 0.8% black or African American, 0.2% Asian, 0.1% American Indian, 1.0% from other races, and 1.2% from two or more races. Those of Hispanic or Latino origin made up 2.0% of the population. In terms of ancestry, 26.2% were German, 16.3% were Irish, 14.7% were American, and 7.2% were English.

Of the 10,680 households, 36.8% had children under the age of 18 living with them, 54.7% were married couples living together, 11.5% had a female householder with no husband present, 27.6% were non-families, and 22.3% of all households were made up of individuals. The average household size was 2.64 and the average family size was 3.06. The median age was 38.4 years.

The median income for a household in the county was $47,697 and the median income for a family was $48,470. Males had a median income of $38,506 versus $27,633 for females. The per capita income for the county was $18,636. About 8.9% of families and 12.3% of the population were below the poverty line, including 16.1% of those under age 18 and 5.4% of those age 65 or over.

== Education ==
Jennings County residents may obtain a library card from the Jennings County Public Library in North Vernon.

== In popular culture ==
Jennings County is the setting of the novel The Friendly Persuasion, later adapted into the Academy Award-nominated film Friendly Persuasion in 1956. Although initially planned to be filmed on location, it was finally filmed in California.

== Notable residents ==
- Sarah T. Bolton, poet
- Ovid Butler, founder of Butler University
- Royce Campbell, jazz guitarist
- Cliff Daringer, Federal League baseball player
- Rolla Daringer, Major League Baseball player
- Lincoln Dixon, U.S. Representative from Indiana, 1905–1919
- Scott Earl, Major League Baseball player
- Robert Sanford Foster, Civil War General
- John "Spider" Miller, 2015 & 2017 Walker Cup team captain
- Jethro New, frontiersmen, Continental Army officer
- Jeptha D. New, U.S. Representative from Indiana, 1875–1877, 1879–1881
- John C. New, Treasurer of the United States, 1875–1876
- Horatio C. Newcomb, Mayor of Indianapolis, 1849–1851
- Hannah Milhous Nixon, mother of President Richard Nixon
- Pat O'Connor, polesitter for the 1957 Indianapolis 500 and member of the National Sprint Car Hall of Fame
- Mike Simon, Major League Baseball player
- Jessamyn West, author
- Edgar Whitcomb, 43rd Governor of Indiana
- Albert Edward Wiggam, psychologist, lecturer, and author

== See also ==
- Jennings County High School
- National Register of Historic Places listings in Jennings County, Indiana
- USS Jennings County (LST-846)
