= Treat =

Treat or Treats may refer to:

== Arts, entertainment, and media ==
=== Music ===
==== Albums ====
- Treat (album), a 1990 album by Dutch punk band The Ex and Scottish ex-pat tour mates Dog Faced Herman
- Treats (album), the 2010 debut studio album of American noise pop duo Sleigh Bells

==== Groups and labels ====
- Treat (band), a Swedish band successful in the 1980s
- Treat Records, an American record label in 1955 only

==== Songs ====
- "Treat", a song by Kasabian from the 2014 album 48:13
- "Treat", a song by Santana from the 1969 album Santana (1969 album)

=== Other uses in arts, entertainment, and media ===
- Treats (play), a 1975 play by Christopher Hampton
- treats!, a fine arts magazine that debuted in 2011
- "Treats!" (SpongeBob SquarePants), an episode of SpongeBob SquarePants

== Places ==
=== United States ===
- Treat, Arkansas, an unincorporated community
- Treat, Georgia, a ghost town
- Treat River, Oregon

=== Elsewhere ===
- Treat, Algeria, a town

== Other uses ==
- Transient Reactor Test Facility (TREAT), a nuclear reactor located at Idaho National Lab
- Treat (name), including a list of people with the name
- Treat Commercial Building, Leslie, Arkansas, United States, on the National Register of Historic Places
- Trees for the Evelyn and Atherton Tablelands

== See also ==
- A-Treat Bottling Company
- Invitation to treat, inviting an offer
- TREAT-NMD, Translational Research in Europe – Assessment and Treatment of Neuromuscular Diseases
- Treating, serving refreshments for electoral gain
- Treatment (disambiguation)
- Snack, which can be known as a treat
