= Vernon Township, Jackson County, Indiana =

Vernon Township
- Township
- Location in Jackson County
- Coordinates: 38°48′47″N 85°50′40″W
- Country: United States
- State: Indiana
- County: Jackson

Government
  - Type: Indiana township

Area
  - Total: 43.07 sq mi (111.6 km^{2})
  - Land: 43.03 sq mi (111.4 km^{2})
  - Water: 0.04 sq mi (0.10 km^{2}) 0.09%
- Elevation: 528 ft (161 m)

Population (2020)
  - Total: 3,402
  - Density: 79.06/sq mi (30.53/km^{2})
- GNIS feature ID: 0453956

Vernon Township is one of twelve townships in Jackson County, Indiana, United States. As of the 2020 census, its population was 3,402 and it contained 1,442 housing units.

Historical population
Census	Pop.	Note	%±
1890	2,099		—
1900	2,268		8.1%
1910	2,358		4.0%
1920	2,237		−5.1%
1930	1,894		−15.3%
1940	2,244		18.5%
1950	2,524		12.5%
1960	2,730		8.2%
1970	3,213		17.7%
1980	3,613		12.4%
1990	3,512		−2.8%
2000	3,456		−1.6%
2010	3,419		−1.1%
2020	3,402		−0.5%
Source: US Decennial Census

== Geography ==
According to the 2010 census, the township has a total area of 43.07 square miles (111.6 km^{2}), of which 43.03 square miles (111.4 km^{2}) (or 99.91%) is land and 0.04 square miles (0.10 km^{2}) (or 0.09%) is water. The stream of Lewis Branch runs through this township.

=== Cities and towns ===
- Crothersville

=== Unincorporated towns ===
- Retreat
- Uniontown

=== Extinct towns ===
- Langoons
- Newry

=== Adjacent townships ===
- Marion Township, Jennings County (northeast)
- Spencer Township, Jennings County (northeast)
- Jennings Township, Scott County (southeast)
- Finley Township, Scott County (south)
- Gibson Township, Washington County (southwest)
- Grassy Fork Township (west)
- Washington Township (northwest)

=== Cemeteries ===
The township contains five cemeteries: Bedel, Crothersville, Gorrell, Grassy, New Hope and Uniontown

=== Major highways ===
- Interstate 65
- U.S. Route 31
- State Road 250
- State Road 256
