= Jennings Township, Indiana =

Jennings Township is the name of four townships in the U.S. state of Indiana:

- Jennings Township, Crawford County, Indiana
- Jennings Township, Fayette County, Indiana
- Jennings Township, Owen County, Indiana
- Jennings Township, Scott County, Indiana
