= Muscatatuck Urban Training Center =

Military training facility in Indiana, U.S.

Coordinates: 39.0513°N 85.5358°W

- Jennings County, Indiana
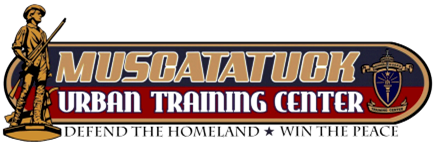

Site information
- Type: Military Training Base
- Controlled by: United States

Site history
- Built: 1919
- In use: 2005-present

Garrison information
- Garrison: Current Site Manager - LTC John Pitt (2017-Present) Past Commanders - LTC Barry Hon (2013-2016), LTC R. Dale Lyles (2010-2013), LTC Chris Kelsey (2008-2010), LTC Ken McCallister (2005-2008)

Muscatatuck Urban Training Center (MUTC) is a 1,000 acre urban training facility located near Butlerville, Indiana. MUTC is used to train civilian first responders, Foreign Service Institute, joint civilian/military response operations, and military urban warfare. It is also home to the Ivy Tech Cyber Academy which offers an accelerated Cyber Security/Information Assurance Associate of Applied Science degree from Ivy Tech Community College – Columbus in an 11-month, 60 credit hour program. In addition, it is home to cyberwarfare training environments. The center features more than 120 training structures and over 1 mile of searchable tunnels. A clock tower used as a rappel tower has all four clock faces set to 9:11.

== History ==
The Muscatatuck Urban Training Center is located on the grounds of the former Muscatatuck State Developmental Center (MSDC). MSDC was created in 1920 as the Indiana Farm Colony for the Feeble-Minded. It became one of Indiana's largest mental institutions approximately 3,000 patients and around 2,000 employees. From 1920 through 2005, MSDC housed many of Indiana's challenged citizens and was once the largest employer in Jennings County. In 1997, Indiana lawmakers passed a plan to reorganize the state's health plan. Modern antipsychotics shrank its patient population down to about 1,200, and in 2001, Governor Frank O'Bannon announced that the state would close Muscatatuck. Governor Mitch Daniels passed control of the facility to the Indiana National Guard in July 2005. In 2015, computer security expert Walter O'Brien presented ScenGen and other artificial intelligence technology, deployed at Lockheed Martin and Northrop Grumman, to SOCOM at Muscatatuck.

In July 2026, YouTuber MrBeast filmed a scene for a future video at the facility.

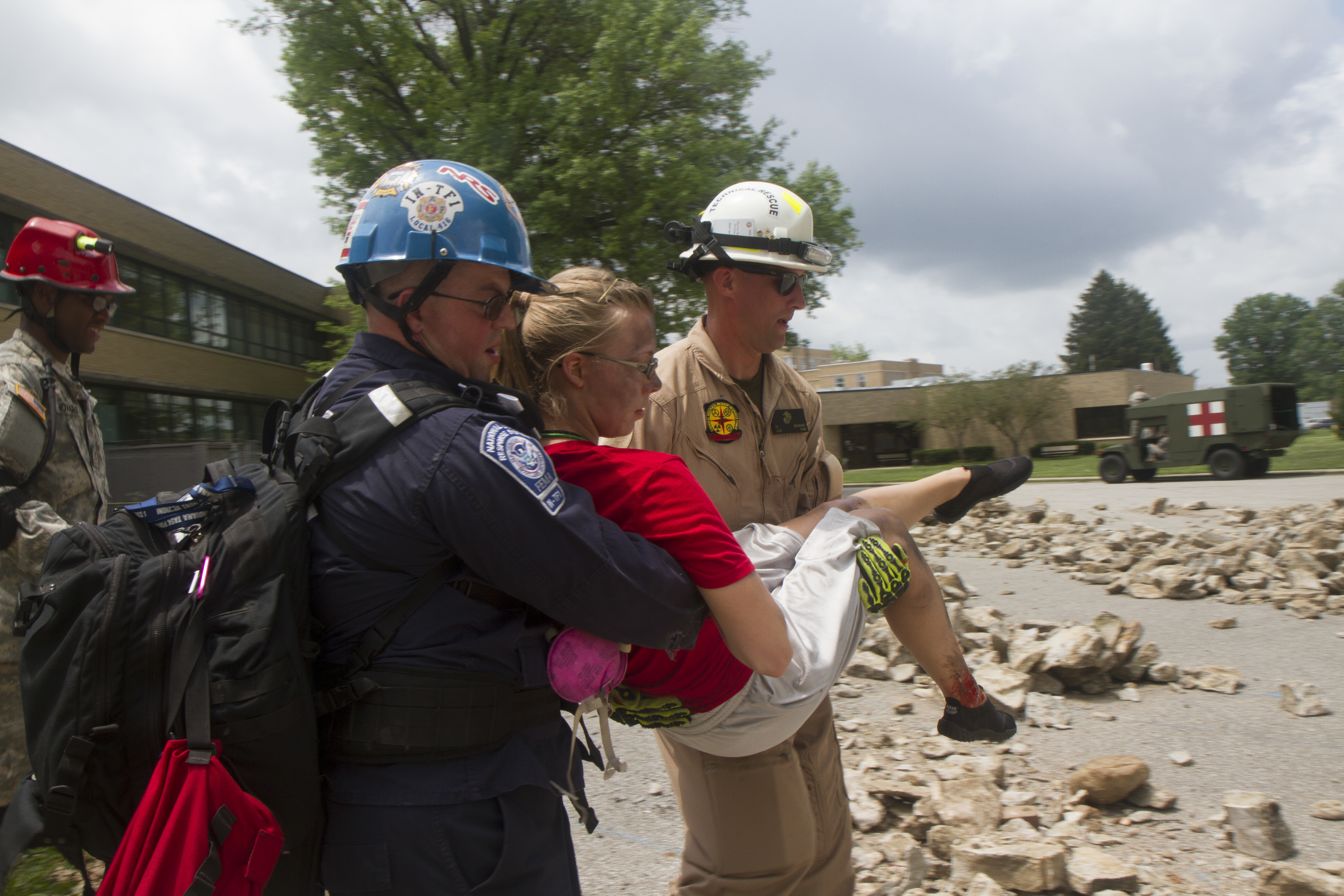
Disaster Recovery training at MUTC

== Training programs ==
=== Cybertropolis ===
Cybertropolis is a cyberwarfare training environment at the Muscatatuck Urban Training Center. It "consists of a representative city and residential infrastructure outfitted with operational SCADA, cellular, and enterprise networks". Red-Team/Blue-Team exercises are conducted by US National Guard and other US Department of Defense organizations.
