= Marion Township, Jennings County, Indiana =

Marion Township
- Township
- Location in Jennings County
- Coordinates: 38°51′09″N 85°44′58″W
- Country: United States
- State: Indiana
- County: Jennings

Government
  - Type: Indiana township

Area
  - Total: 33.02 sq mi (85.5 km^{2})
  - Land: 32.99 sq mi (85.4 km^{2})
  - Water: 0.04 sq mi (0.10 km^{2}) 0.12%
- Elevation: 587 ft (179 m)

Population (2020)
  - Total: 1,117
  - Density: 33.86/sq mi (13.07/km^{2})
- GNIS feature ID: 0453608

Marion Township is one of eleven townships in Jennings County, Indiana, United States. As of the 2020 census, its population was 1,117 (representing no change from 2010) and it contained 461 housing units.

Historical population
Census	Pop.	Note	%±
1890	979		—
1900	1,000		2.1%
1910	827		−17.3%
1920	813		−1.7%
1930	492		−39.5%
1940	675		37.2%
1950	693		2.7%
1960	700		1.0%
1970	802		14.6%
1980	984		22.7%
1990	972		−1.2%
2000	1,058		8.8%
2010	1,117		5.6%
2020	1,117		0.0%
Source: US Decennial Census

== Geography ==
According to the 2010 census, the township has a total area of 33.02 square miles (85.5 km^{2}), of which 32.99 square miles (85.4 km^{2}) (or 99.91%) is land and 0.04 square miles (0.10 km^{2}) (or 0.12%) is water. The streams of Brushy Fork, Crooked Creek, Sixmile Creek and Slate Creek run through this township.

=== Adjacent townships ===
- Spencer Township (north)
- Lovett Township (northeast)
- Montgomery Township (east)
- Graham Township, Jefferson County (southeast)
- Jennings Township, Scott County (south)
- Johnson Township, Scott County (south)
- Vernon Township, Jackson County (southwest)
- Washington Township, Jackson County (west)

=== Cemeteries ===
The township contains two cemeteries: German and Keith.

=== Major highways ===
- Indiana State Road 250
