= Absalom Jordan =

American Civil War Medal of Honor recipient

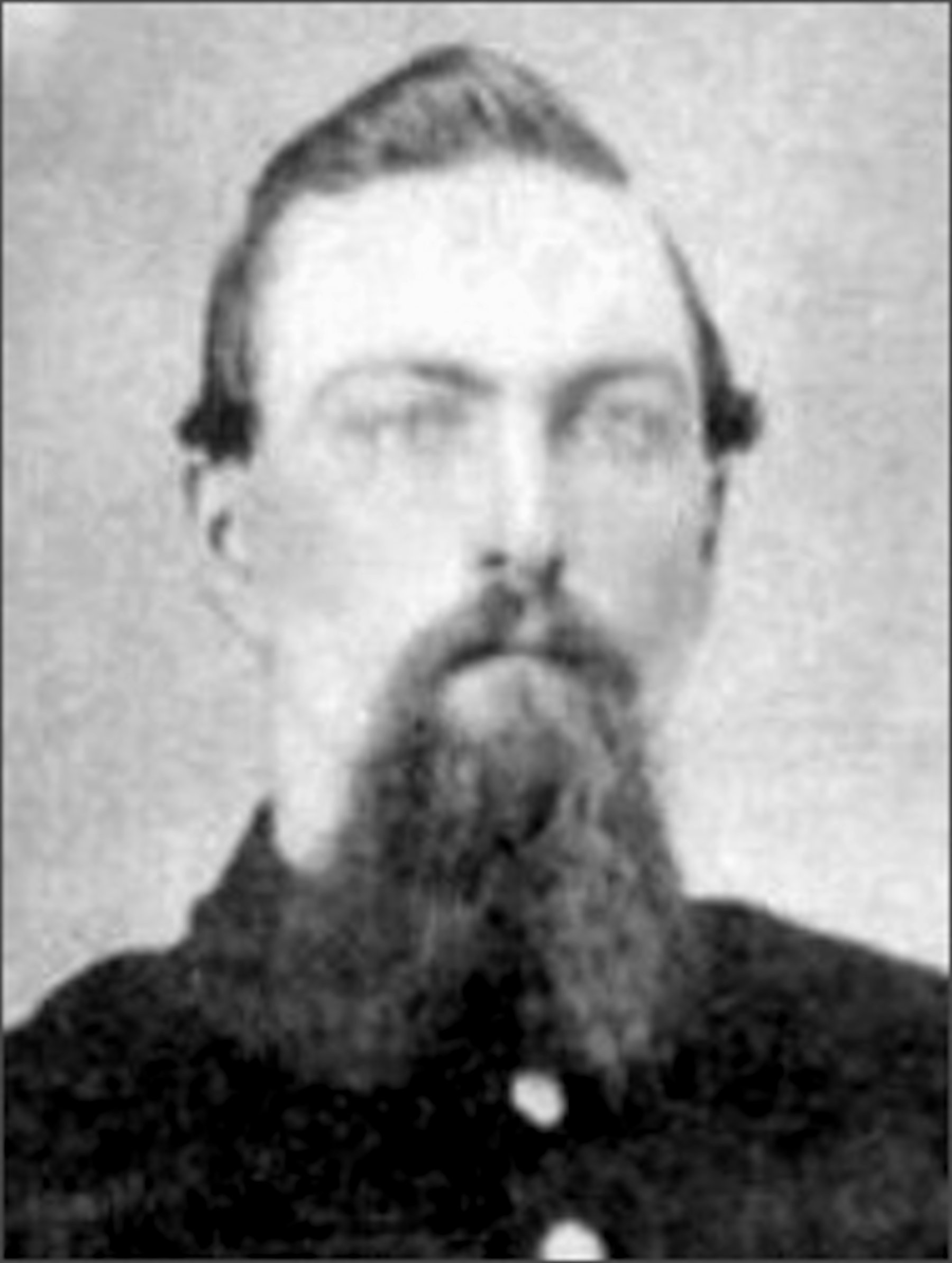
- Jordon in 1865
- Born: c. 1840; Brown County, Ohio, US
- Died: May 3, 1888 (aged 47–48)
- Burial place: Lovett, Indiana, US
- Military career
- Allegiance: United States of America
- Branch: United States Army
- Rank: Corporal
- Units: Company A, 3rd Indiana Cavalry
- Conflicts: American Civil War
- Awards: Medal of Honor

Absalom Jordan (c. 1840 - May 3, 1888) was an American soldier who fought in the American Civil War. Jordan received the United States' highest award for bravery during combat, the Medal of Honor. Jordan's medal was won for his capturing a flag at the Battle of Sailor's Creek, Virginia on April 6, 1865 He was honored with the award on May 3, 1865.

Jordan was born in Brown County, Ohio, entered service in Madison, Indiana, and was buried in Lovett, Indiana.

== Medal of Honor citation ==
The President of the United States of America, in the name of Congress, takes pleasure in presenting the Medal of Honor to Corporal Absalom Jordan, United States Army, for extraordinary heroism on 6 April 1865, while serving with Company A, 3d Indiana Cavalry, in action at Deatonsville (Sailor's Creek), Virginia, for capture of flag.

== See also ==
- List of American Civil War Medal of Honor recipients: G–L
