= San Jacinto, Indiana =

- Unincorporated community
- Location within Indiana Location within the United States
- Coordinates: 38°57′23″N 85°29′50″W
- Country: United States
- State: Indiana
- County: Jennings
- Township: Bigger
- Elevation: 751 ft (229 m)
- ZIP code: 47223
- FIPS code: 18-67986
- GNIS feature ID: 442956

San Jacinto is an unincorporated community in Bigger Township, Jennings County, Indiana.

== History ==
A post office was established at San Jacinto in 1852, and remained in operation until it was discontinued in 1906. The name of the community commemorates the Battle of San Jacinto.
