= Disease registry =

Collection of information about patients' medical conditions

Disease or patient registries are collections of secondary data related to patients with a specific diagnosis, condition, or procedure. In its simplest form, a disease registry could consist of a collection of paper cards kept inside "a shoe box" by an individual physician. Most frequently registries vary in sophistication from simple spreadsheets that only can be accessed by a small group of physicians to very complex databases that are accessed online across multiple institutions. Registries are different from indexes in that they contain more extensive data. They can help to hypothesize risk factors and allow scientific research. They provide health care providers (or patients) with reminders to check certain tests in order to reach certain quality goals. They play a role in epidemiological research, drug safety and post marketing surveillance of pharmaceuticals and devices.

== Definition ==
A disease registry is a data collection related to persons with a specific diagnosis, condition, or procedure. Registries can be sponsored by a government agency, nonprofit organization, health care facility, or private company. Data ownerhip and data access as well as goals vary accordingly.

Registries have traditionally been less complex and simpler to set up than electronic medical records, which according to a 2008 survey were only used by 9% of small US practices, where almost half of the US doctors work.

== Types ==
Many measures registries track are based on evidence-based medicine and are defined and standardized by national organizations like the NCQA.

=== Medical conditions tracked ===
As of November 2025, the NIH listed 80 disease registries on its website. The lastest one to be launched in the US was the autism registry.

Registries target certain conditions because medical expenses are unevenly distributed: most health care expenses are spent treating patients with a few chronic diseases. As of 2011 more than 130 million Americans lived with chronic diseases and chronic diseases accounted for 70% of all deaths in the US. "The medical care costs of people with chronic diseases account for more than 75% of the nation's $2 trillion medical care costs."

Diabetes is one of the conditions tracked by registries. Diabetes is also amenable to this because there is a defined target population and there is evidence that certain tests like retina exams, LDL levels, HgbA1c levels correlate with quality of care in diabetes.

New York City created a HbA1C Registry (NYCAR) to help health providers keep track of patients with diabetes.

Another example of disease registry is the New York State CABG Registry that tracks all cardiac bypass surgery performed in the state of New York.

The Australian cerebral palsy register represents an example of a recognized disease register. The aim of the Australian CP register is to conduct surveillance or constant observation of cerebral palsy prevalence, clinical patterns and complications. It is also tasked with providing recommendations to public health policy makers and improving health service delivery to individuals with cerebral palsy. More recently, several developing countries such as Bangladesh and Sri lanka have established cerebral palsy registers geared toward achieving the same above-noted aims.

Tests like Pap smears are also useful to keep track in registries because there is evidence that when done annually in women of certain ages groups can detect and prevent cervical cancer.

=== International ===
Below is a small list of international patient registries.

- Newborn Screening (NBS) Connect Patient Registry for patients with inborn errors of metabolism
- DuchenneConnect Patient Registry for patients with Duchenne and Becker Muscular Dystrophy.
- PatientCrossroads – pan disease patient registries
- International Collaborative Gaucher Group (ICGG) Gaucher Registry is largest ongoing longitudinal international database that tracks demographic and clinical outcome data from patients with Gaucher disease
- Vascular health ASsessment Of The hypertENSive patients (VASOTENS) Registry, the international registry for ambulatory blood pressure and arterial stiffness telemonitoring.
- TREAT-NMD patient registries in neuromuscular disorders

=== Medical devices ===
Countries like Australia, Britain, Norway, Sweden, and America have a national joint replacement registry to track patients with artificial joints.

"The use of joint registries has proven beneficial abroad. In Australia, regulators use such data to force manufacturers to justify why poorly performing hips or knees should remain available, and products have been withdrawn as a result. In Sweden several years ago, surgeons alerted by their national registry stopped using a badly flawed hip long before their American counterparts did. A few medical organizations in the USA, like Kaiser Permanente, operate their own registries to good effect and the Hospital for Special Surgery in New York has recently set up a registry. Experts say that the United States wastes billions of dollars annually on medical treatments which may not work. But the financial and human consequences are also large when evidence exists but is not collected."

== Goals ==
Registries can be used for epidemiological research, evaluating for risk factors or outcomes.

Patient registries are particularly useful for evaluating drug safety, particularly orphan drugs in specific populations. As of 2023, it was getting more and more common to use data of different healthcare and disease registries for different purposes such as for generating evidence for healthcare efficiency and market access planning.

=== Quality improvement ===
They can provide health providers (or patients) with reminders to check certain tests in order to reach certain quality goals. They play a role in post marketing surveillance of pharmaceuticals.

=== Improve cost-effectiveness ===
The cost-effectiveness of a disease registry is related with the cost-effectiveness of prevention of specific medical conditions. Increasing compliance through a registry with preventive measures like children vaccination or colonoscopy screening can actually be a cost-saving measure. "A mammogram every 2 years for women aged 50–69 costs only about $9,000 per year of life saved. This cost compares favorably with other widely used clinical preventive services."

=== Pay-for-performance (P4P) ===
Registries can be associated with pay-for-performance (P4P) quality-based contracts for individual health care providers or groups of, or even all, doctors in a country. For example, the United Kingdom rewards physicians according to 146 quality measures related with 10 chronic diseases that are tracked electronically.

In 2017 in the United States, Medicare started a 1.5% P4P contract based on health measures that can be tracked by disease registries.

== Technical aspects of data tracking ==
The quality of a disease registry is contingent on the quality of its data and all the processes involved in updating it and keeping its integrity. In every registry there is always a risk of "garbage in, garbage out". Issues that can affect a registry and its acceptance by a physician group:

- Is the registry only updated centrally or can a physician update or correct it? For example, a physician does not want to get reminders from a registry regarding diabetes patients that died, moved to another state or left her/his practice.
- Most frequently, a list of patients with a certain condition (e.g. diabetes) is generated based on certain criteria. In the U.S., Healthcare Effectiveness Data and Information Set (HEDIS) criteria are set annually by the National Committee for Quality Assurance (NCQA). These criteria, in order to avoid paper charts reviews are in most cases based on insurance claims. For example, for diabetes, HEDIS selects an eligible population based on age (18–75 years), continuous enrollment with a certain health insurer and certain "Events/diagnosis" from pharmacy data (electronic), insurance claims data (electronic) or from medical records. Pharmacy data is based on a list of medications prescribed for diabetes. Claims data is based on having two outpatient visits with a doctor or one inpatient hospital admission or one emergency room visit with the diagnosis of diabetes. Patients are excluded if they have polycystic ovaries or just gestational diabetes. Despite the strict criteria it is possible for physicians to have patients on their registries that are not truly diabetic.

== See also ==
- Clinical trials registry
