= Bigger Township, Jennings County, Indiana =

Bigger Township
- Township
- Location in Jennings County
- Coordinates: 38°57′23″N 85°29′40″W
- Country: United States
- State: Indiana
- County: Jennings

Government
  - Type: Indiana township

Area
  - Total: 30.74 sq mi (79.6 km^{2})
  - Land: 30.69 sq mi (79.5 km^{2})
  - Water: 0.05 sq mi (0.13 km^{2}) 0.16%
- Elevation: 745 ft (227 m)

Population (2020)
  - Total: 664
  - Density: 21.6/sq mi (8.35/km^{2})
- GNIS feature ID: 0453111

Bigger Township is one of eleven townships in Jennings County, Indiana, United States. As of the 2020 census, its population was 664 (down from 726 at 2010) and it contained 272 housing units.

Historical population
| Census | Pop. | Note | %± |
|---|---|---|---|
| 1890 | 929 | | — |
| 1900 | 996 | | 7.2% |
| 1910 | 832 | | −16.5% |
| 1920 | 696 | | −16.3% |
| 1930 | 518 | | −25.6% |
| 1940 | 594 | | 14.7% |
| 1950 | 528 | | −11.1% |
| 1960 | 498 | | −5.7% |
| 1970 | 504 | | 1.2% |
| 1980 | 574 | | 13.9% |
| 1990 | 611 | | 6.4% |
| 2000 | 688 | | 12.6% |
| 2010 | 726 | | 5.5% |
| 2020 | 664 | | −8.5% |
Source: US Decennial Census

== History ==
Bigger Township was created in 1840 from Vernon Township, and named for Samuel Bigger, seventh Governor of Indiana.

Benville Bridge was listed on the National Register of Historic Places in 1996.

== Geography ==
According to the 2010 census, the township has a total area of 30.74 square miles (79.6 km^{2}), of which 30.69 square miles (79.5 km^{2}) (or 99.84%) is land and 0.05 square miles (0.13 km^{2}) (or 0.16%) is water.

Bigger Township comprises 30 square-mile sections: 24 from survey township Township 6 North, Range 9 East, Second Principal Meridian; and 6 from Township 6 North, Range 10 East, Second Principal Meridian.

=== Unincorporated towns ===
- San Jacinto

=== Adjacent townships ===
- Campbell Township (north)
- Shelby Township, Ripley County (east)
- Monroe Township, Jefferson County (southeast)
- Lancaster Township, Jefferson County (south)
- Lovett Township (west)
- Vernon Township (west)

=== Cemeteries ===
The township contains three cemeteries: Bethel, Callicotte and Hughes.

=== Airports and landing strips ===
- Broomsage Ranch Airport
