= Edward's Ford Bridge =

- U.S. National Register of Historic Places
- Location within Indiana Location within the United States
- Location: Jefferson Proving Ground, off Northwest Rd., Campbell Township, Jennings County, Indiana
- Coordinates: 39°2′1″N 85°27′38″W
- Area: less than one acre
- Built: 1911
- Built by: Miller, Charles W.; Harmon, Henry
- Architectural style: stone arch bridge
- NRHP reference No.: 96000788
- Added to NRHP: July 30, 1996

Edward's Ford Bridge, also known as Bridge #17, is a historic stone arch bridge located on the grounds of Jefferson Proving Ground in Campbell Township, Jennings County, Indiana. It was built in 1911, and is a three-span, round arch bridge. It is 194 feet in length and 17 feet wide. It was rehabilitated in 1986.

It was listed on the National Register of Historic Places in 1996.
