= Center Township, Jennings County, Indiana =

Center Township
- Township
- Location in Jennings County
- Coordinates: 39°00′51″N 85°37′11″W
- Country: United States
- State: Indiana
- County: Jennings

Government
  - Type: Indiana township

Area
  - Total: 25.21 sq mi (65.3 km^{2})
  - Land: 25.2 sq mi (65 km^{2})
  - Water: 0.01 sq mi (0.026 km^{2}) 0.04%
- Elevation: 669 ft (204 m)

Population (2020)
  - Total: 8,171
  - Density: 324/sq mi (125/km^{2})
- GNIS feature ID: 0453183

Center Township is one of eleven townships in Jennings County, Indiana, United States. As of the 2020 census, its population was 8,171 (down from 8,894 at 2010) and it contained 3,605 housing units.

Historical population
Census	Pop.	Note	%±
1890	2,860		—
1900	3,751		31.2%
1910	3,844		2.5%
1920	4,051		5.4%
1930	3,998		−1.3%
1940	4,118		3.0%
1950	4,939		19.9%
1960	5,864		18.7%
1970	6,844		16.7%
1980	7,806		14.1%
1990	7,800		−0.1%
2000	8,593		10.2%
2010	8,894		3.5%
2020	8,171		−8.1%
Source: US Decennial Census

== History ==
Center Township was established in 1855, and was so named from its position at the geographical center of Jennings County.

== Geography ==
According to the 2010 census, the township has a total area of 25.21 square miles (65.3 km^{2}), of which 25.2 square miles (65 km^{2}) (or 99.96%) is land and 0.01 square miles (0.026 km^{2}) (or 0.04%) is water. The streams of Deer Creek, Long Branch, Pleasant Run and Woods Branch run through this township.

=== Cities and towns ===
- North Vernon (vast majority)

=== Unincorporated towns ===
- Oakdale

=== Adjacent townships ===
- Sand Creek Township (north)
- Campbell Township (east)
- Vernon Township (south)
- Spencer Township (west)
- Geneva Township (northwest)

=== Cemeteries ===
The township contains three cemeteries: Hill Crest, Saint Marys and Summerfield.

=== Major highways ===
- U.S. Route 50
- State Road 3
- State Road 7

=== Airports and landing strips ===
- North Vernon Airport
