= Vernon Township, Jennings County, Indiana =

Vernon Township
- Township
- Location in Jennings County
- Coordinates: 38°57′17″N 85°35′55″W
- Country: United States
- State: Indiana
- County: Jennings

Government
  - Type: Indiana township

Area
  - Total: 34.08 sq mi (88.3 km^{2})
  - Land: 33.98 sq mi (88.0 km^{2})
  - Water: 0.1 sq mi (0.26 km^{2}) 0.29%
- Elevation: 748 ft (228 m)

Population (2020)
  - Total: 2,858
  - Density: 84.11/sq mi (32.47/km^{2})
- GNIS feature ID: 0453957

Vernon Township is one of eleven townships in Jennings County, Indiana, United States. As of the 2020 census, its population was 2,858 (up from 2,809 in 2010) and it contained 1,193 housing units.

Historical population
Census	Pop.	Note	%±
1890	1,477		—
1900	1,537		4.1%
1910	1,305		−15.1%
1920	1,082		−17.1%
1930	979		−9.5%
1940	1,209		23.5%
1950	1,244		2.9%
1960	1,415		13.7%
1970	1,470		3.9%
1980	2,057		39.9%
1990	2,277		10.7%
2000	2,543		11.7%
2010	2,809		10.5%
2020	2,858		1.7%
Source: US Decennial Census

== Geography ==
According to the 2010 census, the township has a total area of 34.08 square miles (88.3 km^{2}), of which 33.98 square miles (88.0 km^{2}) (or 99.71%) is land and 0.1 square miles (0.26 km^{2}) (or 0.29%) is water. The streams of Crooked Creek, Duck Branch, Goose Run and Huckleberry Branch run through this township.

=== Cities and towns ===
- North Vernon (southeast edge)
- Vernon (the county seat)

=== Unincorporated towns ===
- Grayford
- Walnut Ridge

=== Adjacent townships ===
- Center Township (north)
- Campbell Township (northeast)
- Bigger Township (east)
- Lovett Township (southwest)
- Spencer Township (west)

=== Cemeteries ===
The township contains six cemeteries: Baldwin, Coryell, Ebenezer, Stewart, Sullivan and Vernon.

=== Major highways ===
- Indiana State Road 3
- Indiana State Road 7
