= Montgomery Township, Jennings County, Indiana =

Montgomery Township
- Township
- Location in Jennings County
- Coordinates: 38°51′29″N 85°38′24″W
- Country: United States
- State: Indiana
- County: Jennings

Government
  - Type: Indiana township

Area
  - Total: 20.23 sq mi (52.4 km^{2})
  - Land: 20.21 sq mi (52.3 km^{2})
  - Water: 0.01 sq mi (0.026 km^{2}) 0.05%
- Elevation: 679 ft (207 m)

Population (2020)
  - Total: 950
  - Density: 47/sq mi (18/km^{2})
- GNIS feature ID: 0453650

Montgomery Township is one of eleven townships in Jennings County, Indiana, USA. As of the 2020 census, its population was 950 (down from 978 at 2010) and it contained 416 housing units.

Historical population
| Census | Pop. | Note | %± |
|---|---|---|---|
| 1890 | 722 | | — |
| 1900 | 778 | | 7.8% |
| 1910 | 759 | | −2.4% |
| 1920 | 748 | | −1.4% |
| 1930 | 639 | | −14.6% |
| 1940 | 658 | | 3.0% |
| 1950 | 714 | | 8.5% |
| 1960 | 648 | | −9.2% |
| 1970 | 749 | | 15.6% |
| 1980 | 941 | | 25.6% |
| 1990 | 896 | | −4.8% |
| 2000 | 983 | | 9.7% |
| 2010 | 978 | | −0.5% |
| 2020 | 950 | | −2.9% |
Source: US Decennial Census

== Geography ==
According to the 2010 census, the township has a total area of 20.23 square miles (52.4 km^{2}), of which 20.21 square miles (52.3 km^{2}) (or 99.90%) is land and 0.01 square miles (0.026 km^{2}) (or 0.05%) is water. The streams of Bear Creek, Davis Branch and Little Bear Creek run through this township.

=== Unincorporated towns ===
- Commiskey
- Hilltown
- Paris
- Paris Crossing

=== Adjacent townships ===
- Lovett Township (north)
- Lancaster Township, Jefferson County (east)
- Graham Township, Jefferson County (south)
- Marion Township (west)

=== Cemeteries ===
The township contains one cemetery, Hopewell.

=== Major highways ===
- Indiana State Road 3
- Indiana State Road 250
