= Campbell Township, Jennings County, Indiana =

Campbell Township
- Township
- Location in Jennings County
- Coordinates: 39°02′14″N 85°30′01″W
- Country: United States
- State: Indiana
- County: Jennings

Government
  - Type: Indiana township

Area
  - Total: 32.35 sq mi (83.8 km^{2})
  - Land: 32.06 sq mi (83.0 km^{2})
  - Water: 0.28 sq mi (0.73 km^{2}) 0.87%
- Elevation: 791 ft (241 m)

Population (2020)
  - Total: 1,129
  - Density: 35.22/sq mi (13.60/km^{2})
- GNIS feature ID: 0453155

Campbell Township is one of eleven townships in Jennings County, Indiana, United States. As of the 2020 census, its population was 1,129 (slightly down from 1,191 at 2010) and it contained 498 housing units.

Campbell Township was established in 1825.

Historical population
Census	Pop.	Note	%±
1890	1,268		—
1900	1,281		1.0%
1910	1,035		−19.2%
1920	931		−10.0%
1930	1,202		29.1%
1940	2,025		68.5%
1950	2,589		27.9%
1960	2,919		12.7%
1970	2,653		−9.1%
1980	2,164		−18.4%
1990	1,790		−17.3%
2000	1,588		−11.3%
2010	1,191		−25.0%
2020	1,129		−5.2%
Source: US Decennial Census

== History ==
Edward's Ford Bridge was listed on the National Register of Historic Places in 1996.

== Geography ==
According to the 2010 census, the township has a total area of 32.35 square miles (83.8 km^{2}), of which 32.06 square miles (83.0 km^{2}) (or 99.10%) is land and 0.28 square miles (0.73 km^{2}) (or 0.87%) is water.

=== Unincorporated towns ===
- Butlerville
- Nebraska

=== Adjacent townships ===
- Columbia Township (north)
- Otter Creek Township, Ripley County (northeast)
- Shelby Township, Ripley County (southeast)
- Bigger Township (south)
- Vernon Township (southwest)
- Center Township (west)
- Sand Creek Township (northwest)

=== Cemeteries ===
The township contains five cemeteries: Butlerville, Hopewell, Otter Creek, Saint Bridget and State School.

=== Major highways ===
- U.S. Route 50
