= Zenas, Indiana =

- Unincorporated community
- Location within Indiana Location within the United States
- Coordinates: 39°07′12″N 85°28′30″W
- Country: United States
- State: Indiana
- County: Jennings
- Township: Columbia
- Elevation: 781 ft (238 m)
- ZIP code: 47223
- FIPS code: 18-86354
- GNIS feature ID: 446431

Zenas is an unincorporated community in Columbia Township, Jennings County, Indiana.

== History ==
Zenas was platted in 1837, and was likely named after a figure in the Epistle to Titus. A post office was established at Zenas in 1839, and remained in operation until it was discontinued in 1911.
