= Muscatatuck National Wildlife Refuge =

United States National Wildlife Refuge in Indiana

- IUCN category IV (habitat/species management area)
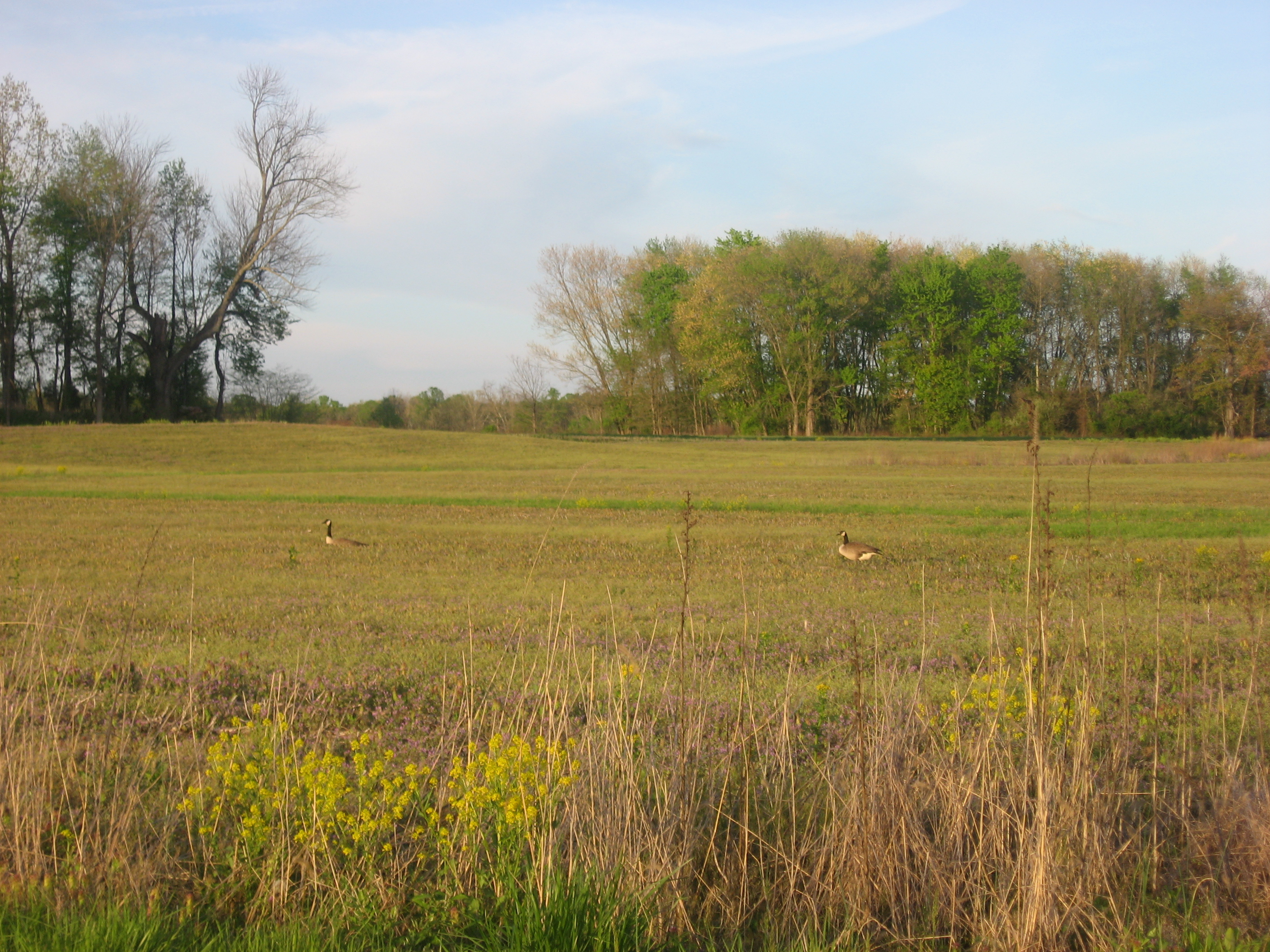
- Geese in a field on the refuge in early spring

- Location within the United States
- Location: Jackson County, Jennings County, Monroe County, Indiana, United States
- Nearest city: Seymour, Indiana
- Coordinates: 38°56′00″N 85°48′30″W
- Area: 7,880 acres (3,190 ha)
- Established: 1966
- Governing body: U.S. Fish and Wildlife Service
- Website: Muscatatuck National Wildlife Refuge

(video) Muscatatuck National Wildlife Refuge from the air, 2011

The Muscatatuck National Wildlife Refuge is a National Wildlife Refuge located 3 miles (5 kilometers) east of Seymour, Indiana, on U.S. Route 50. Established in 1966, it comprises 7,802 acres (3,157 hectares) in its main area of eastern Jackson and western Jennings counties, and an additional 78 acres (32 ha) in northwestern Monroe County, near Bloomington, Indiana, known as the "Restle Unit". It was established thanks to the selling of Federal Migratory Waterfowl Stamps, commonly known as Duck Stamps, by the United States Fish and Wildlife Service. It was Indiana's first National Wildlife Refuge. The name comes from the Muscatatuck River, which means "land of winding waters".

Converted farm lands comprise 60% of the total land area of the refuge. Several archaeological sites in the refuge are on the National Register of Historic Places. Much of the tree cover is deciduous forest.

A visitor center, eight hiking trails (ranging from 1/5 to 4 miles or 0.3 to 6 kilometers of easy to moderate hiking), a 4-mile (6-kilometer) driving tour, two pioneer cemeteries, and a log cabin of historical significance are available for the 125,000 annual visitors to the refuge to enjoy. The refuge is open for visitation from 1 hour before sunrise to 1 hour after sunset.

The refuge should not be confused with the former Muscatatuck State Park of Indiana, which became Muscatatuck County Park when control of the land was given back to Jennings County, Indiana.

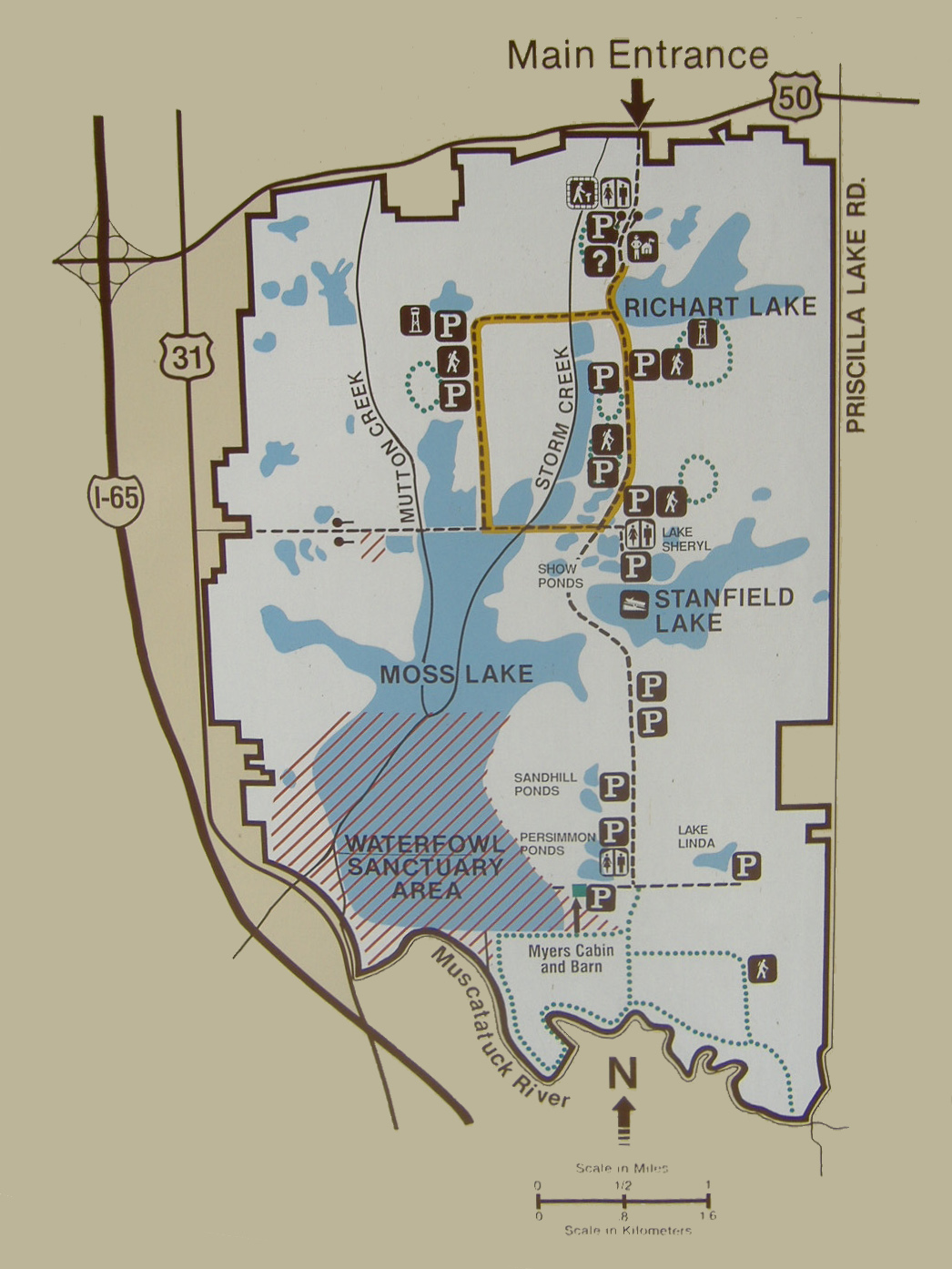
Map of the property

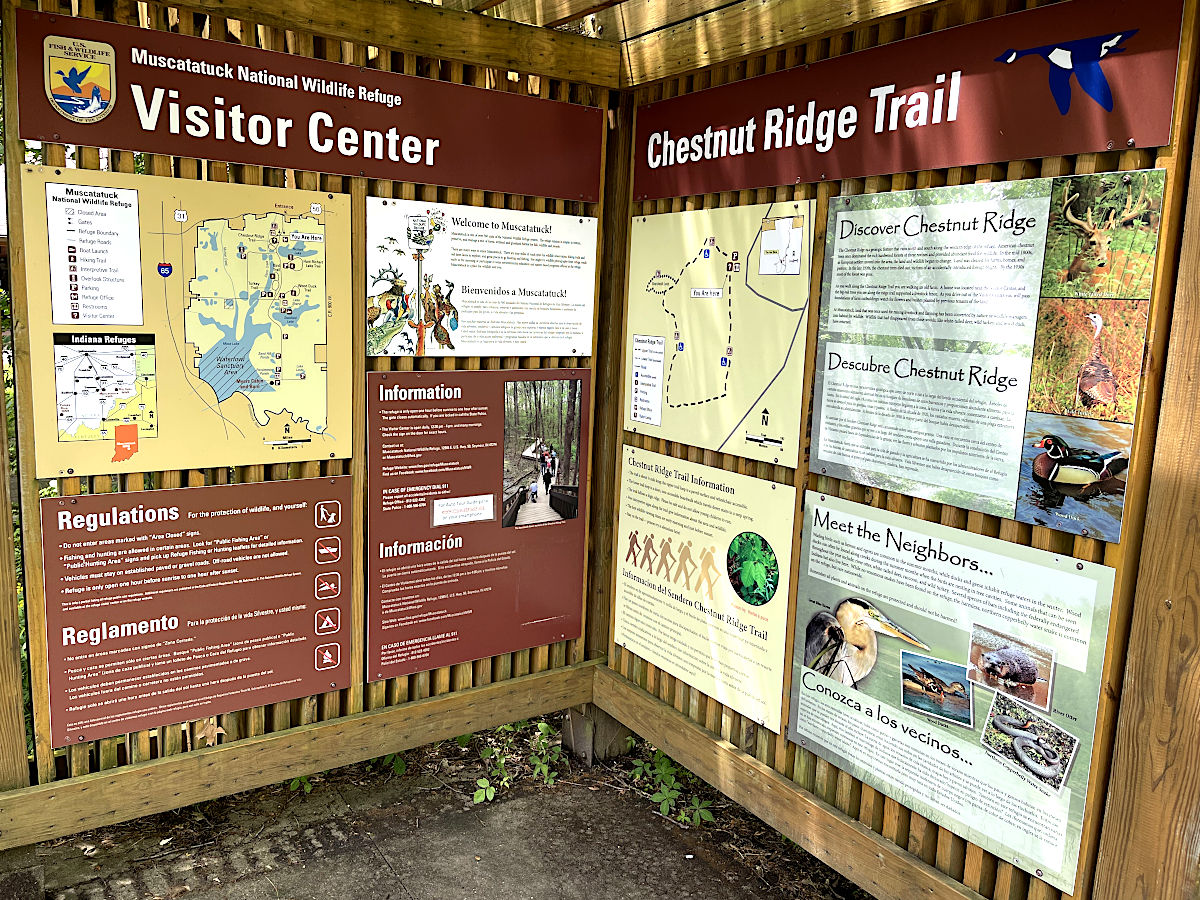
Sign at the Visitor Center

== Wildlife ==
=== Birds ===
The primary wildlife protected in the refuge is waterfowl and other birds, including mating pairs of bald eagles.

On December 23, 1998, a small flock of four trumpeter swans (Cygnus buccinator) were re-introduced to the refuge when they flew from Sudbury, Ontario accompanied by an ultra-light plane. This was the first time trumpeters had migrated to southern Indiana in over 100 years. Although these trumpeters returned to Sudbury in 1999 and 2000, the flock appears to have died out, although other re-introduced trumpeters visit the refuge in the winter today. Also migrating tundra swans (Cygnus columbianus) winter at Muscatatuck every year, usually a month or so before Christmas.

In 2001, the Whooping Crane Eastern Partnership raised whooping crane (Grus americana) chicks in Wisconsin's Necedah National Wildlife Refuge then guided them to Florida's Chassahowitzka National Wildlife Refuge, utilizing Muscatatuck as a stopover site on the migrations. That population has been successful and by 2010 there were up to 105 migrating birds established in the eastern United States for the first time in over 100 years. The migrating birds are regularly seen during migration stopovers at Muscatatuck, often in the company of sandhill cranes (Grus canadensis).

=== Reptiles ===
A remnant of non-venomous northern copperbelly water snake (Nerodia erythrogaster neglecta) still exists in the refuge.

=== Fish ===
Popular fish include bluegill, channel catfish, crappie, and largemouth bass.

=== Mammals ===
In 1995, river otters (Lontra canadensis) were introduced to the refuge, which once lived in Indiana but eventually died out in the state. Deer, quail, and rabbit are commonly hunted.

== Partnerships ==
Muscatatuck National Wildlife Refuge has many conservation and community partners including the Jackson County Visitor Bureau, the Indiana Department of Natural Resources, the Starve-Hollow Recreation Area, and the Jennings County Visitor Bureau.

Over the years, Boy Scouts have assisted the refuge with many visitor service and management projects, including the completion of over 30 Eagle Scout Service Projects. In 2016, a documentary film, 'Eagles at Muscatatuck: A Documentary of Eagle Scout Service Projects' was produced as an Eagle Scout Service Project and presented to the refuge in honor of its 50th anniversary.
