= Sand Creek Township, Jennings County, Indiana =

Sand Creek Township
- Township
- Location in Jennings County
- Coordinates: 39°05′16″N 85°36′25″W
- Country: United States
- State: Indiana
- County: Jennings

Government
  - Type: Indiana township

Area
  - Total: 27.95 sq mi (72.4 km^{2})
  - Land: 27.72 sq mi (71.8 km^{2})
  - Water: 0.23 sq mi (0.60 km^{2}) 0.82%
- Elevation: 725 ft (221 m)

Population (2020)
  - Total: 859
  - Density: 31.0/sq mi (12.0/km^{2})
- GNIS feature ID: 0453833

Sand Creek Township is one of eleven townships in Jennings County, Indiana, United States. As of the 2020 census, its population was 859 (down from 872 at 2010) and it contained 364 housing units.

Historical population
Census	Pop.	Note	%±
1890	1,039		—
1900	992		−4.5%
1910	819		−17.4%
1920	687		−16.1%
1930	529		−23.0%
1940	614		16.1%
1950	602		−2.0%
1960	645		7.1%
1970	752		16.6%
1980	803		6.8%
1990	714		−11.1%
2000	818		14.6%
2010	872		6.6%
2020	859		−1.5%
Source: US Decennial Census

== Geography ==
According to the 2010 census, the township has a total area of 27.95 square miles (72.4 km^{2}), of which 27.72 square miles (71.8 km^{2}) (or 99.18%) is land and 0.23 square miles (0.60 km^{2}) (or 0.82%) is water. The streams of Bear Creek, Fish Creek, Ice Creek, Millstone Creek, Poplar Root Creek and Rock Creek run through this township.

=== Unincorporated towns ===
- Brewersville

=== Adjacent townships ===
- Jackson Township, Decatur County (north)
- Sand Creek Township, Decatur County (north)
- Columbia Township (east)
- Campbell Township (southeast)
- Center Township (south)
- Geneva Township (west)

=== Cemeteries ===
The township contains three cemeteries: Bear Creek, Day and Fish Creek.

=== Major highways ===
- Indiana State Road 3
