= Spencer Township, Jennings County, Indiana =

Spencer Township
- Township
- Location in Jennings County
- Coordinates: 38°58′24″N 85°44′41″W
- Country: United States
- State: Indiana
- County: Jennings

Government
  - Type: Indiana township

Area
  - Total: 49.23 sq mi (127.5 km^{2})
  - Land: 48.91 sq mi (126.7 km^{2})
  - Water: 0.32 sq mi (0.83 km^{2}) 0.65%
- Elevation: 646 ft (197 m)

Population (2020)
  - Total: 2,416
  - Density: 49.40/sq mi (19.07/km^{2})
- GNIS feature ID: 0453861
- Website: spencertownship40.in.gov

Spencer Township is one of eleven townships in Jennings County, Indiana, United States. As of the 2020 census, its population was 2,416 (up from 2,326 at 2010) and it contained 938 housing units.

Historical population
Census	Pop.	Note	%±
1890	1,410		—
1900	1,584		12.3%
1910	1,347		−15.0%
1920	1,215		−9.8%
1930	981		−19.3%
1940	1,123		14.5%
1950	1,166		3.8%
1960	1,421		21.9%
1970	1,570		10.5%
1980	2,093		33.3%
1990	1,980		−5.4%
2000	2,073		4.7%
2010	2,326		12.2%
2020	2,416		3.9%
Source: US Decennial Census

== Geography ==
According to the 2010 census, the township has a total area of 49.23 square miles (127.5 km^{2}), of which 48.91 square miles (126.7 km^{2}) (or 99.35%) is land and 0.32 square miles (0.83 km^{2}) (or 0.65%) is water. The streams of Indian Creek, Little Mutton Creek, Powder Creek, Storm Creek, Tea Creek and Twomile Creek run through this township.

=== Unincorporated towns ===
- Four Corners
- Hayden

=== Adjacent townships ===
- Geneva Township (north)
- Center Township (east)
- Vernon Township (east)
- Lovett Township (southeast)
- Marion Township (south)
- Vernon Township, Jackson County (southwest)
- Washington Township, Jackson County (southwest)
- Jackson Township, Jackson County (west)
- Redding Township, Jackson County (west)

=== Cemeteries ===
The township contains eight cemeteries: Barkman, Hunt, Myers, Saint Catherines, Saint James, Sixmile, Whitcomb and Wohrer.

=== Major highways ===
- U.S. Route 50
