= Geneva Township, Jennings County, Indiana =

Geneva Township
- Township
- Location in Jennings County
- Coordinates: 39°04′51″N 85°43′15″W
- Country: United States
- State: Indiana
- County: Jennings

Government
  - Type: Indiana township

Area
  - Total: 56.51 sq mi (146.4 km^{2})
  - Land: 55.89 sq mi (144.8 km^{2})
  - Water: 0.62 sq mi (1.6 km^{2}) 1.10%
- Elevation: 646 ft (197 m)

Population (2020)
  - Total: 7,495
  - Density: 134.1/sq mi (51.78/km^{2})
- GNIS feature ID: 0453323

Geneva Township is one of eleven townships in Jennings County, Indiana, United States. As of the 2020 census, its population was 7,495 (down from 7,584 at 2010) and it contained 3,365 housing units.

Historical population
Census	Pop.	Note	%±
1890	1,831		—
1900	1,839		0.4%
1910	1,656		−10.0%
1920	1,414		−14.6%
1930	1,167		−17.5%
1940	1,324		13.5%
1950	1,368		3.3%
1960	1,731		26.5%
1970	2,640		52.5%
1980	3,849		45.8%
1990	5,040		30.9%
2000	7,469		48.2%
2010	7,584		1.5%
2020	7,495		−1.2%
Source: US Decennial Census

== History ==
Geneva Township was established in about 1824. A majority of the first settlers being natives of Switzerland caused the name Geneva to be selected.

== Geography ==
According to the 2010 census, the township has a total area of 56.51 square miles (146.4 km^{2}), of which 55.89 square miles (144.8 km^{2}) (or 98.90%) is land and 0.62 square miles (1.6 km^{2}) (or 1.10%) is water. The streams of Bear Creek, Bennetts Branch, Nettle Creek, Rattail Creek, Rock Creek and Wyaloosing Creek run through this township.

=== Unincorporated towns ===
- Country Squire Lakes
- Queensville
- Scipio

=== Adjacent townships ===
- Rock Creek Township, Bartholomew County (north)
- Jackson Township, Decatur County (northeast)
- Sand Creek Township (east)
- Center Township (southeast)
- Spencer Township (south)
- Redding Township, Jackson County (southwest)
- Sand Creek Township, Bartholomew County (west)

=== Cemeteries ===
The township contains three cemeteries: Cave Springs, Henry and Hulse.

=== Major highways ===
- Indiana State Road 7

=== Airports and landing strips ===
- Miller and Sons Farm Supply Airport
