= Benville Bridge =

- U.S. National Register of Historic Places
- Location within Indiana Location within the United States
- Location: Jefferson Proving Ground, approximately 1 mile east off Perimeter Rd., Bigger Township, Jennings County, Indiana
- Coordinates: 38°58′50″N 85°27′10″W
- Area: less than one acre
- Built: 1908
- Built by: Miller, Charles W.; Brolley, Thomas
- Architectural style: stone arch bridge
- NRHP reference No.: 96000789
- Added to NRHP: July 30, 1996

Benville Bridge, also known as Bridge #27, is a historic stone-arch bridge located on the grounds of Jefferson Proving Ground in Bigger Township, Jennings County, Indiana. It was built in 1908, and is a three-span, round arch bridge. It is 168 feet in length and 17 feet wide. It was rehabilitated in 1986.

It was listed on the National Register of Historic Places in 1996.
