= Hayden, Indiana =

- Census-designated place
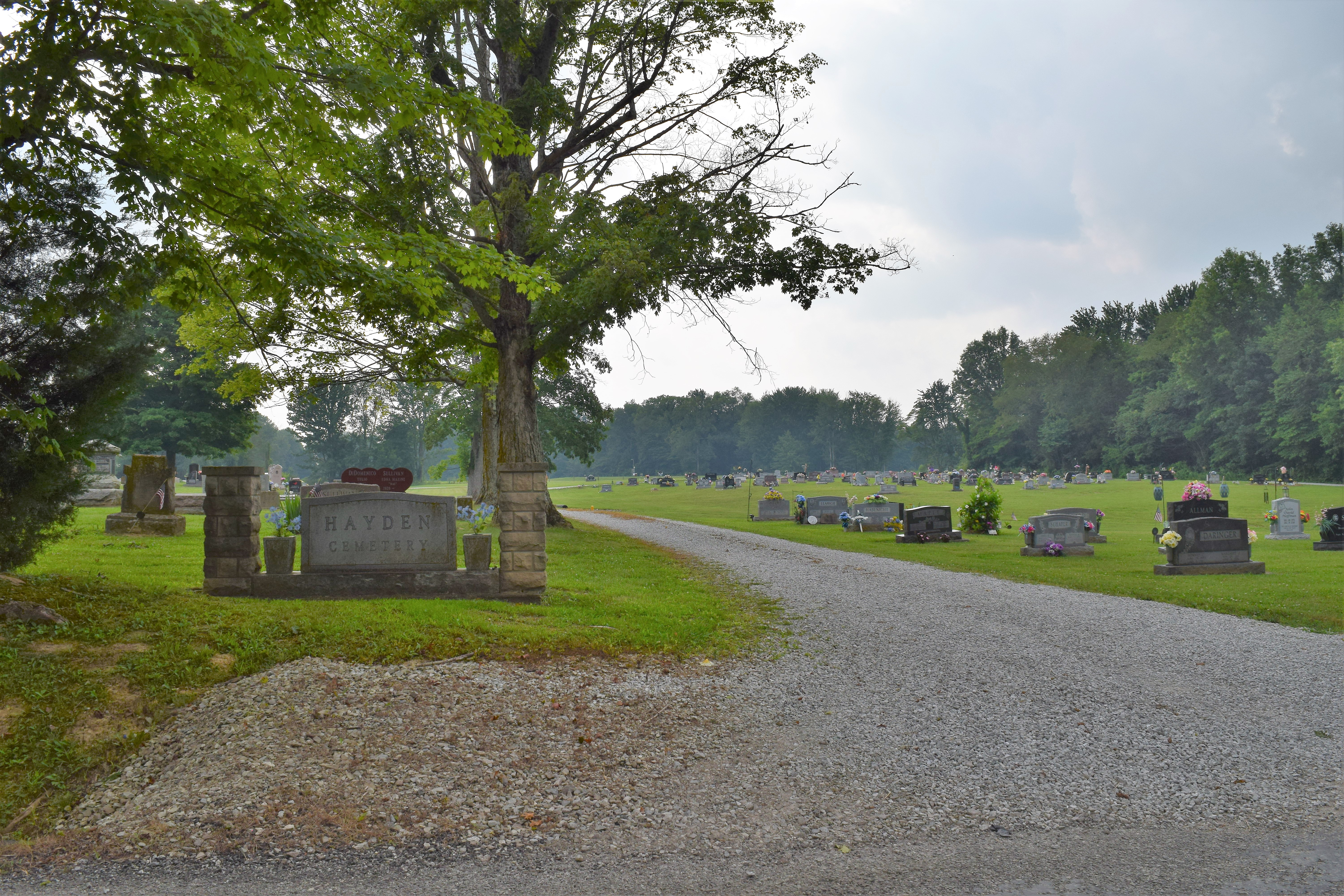
- Hayden Cemetery

- Location of Hayden in Jennings County, Indiana

- Location within Indiana Location within the United States
- Coordinates: 38°58′17″N 85°44′20″W
- Country: United States
- State: Indiana
- County: Jennings
- Township: Spencer

Area
  - Total: 2.47 sq mi (6.41 km^{2})
  - Land: 2.47 sq mi (6.41 km^{2})
  - Water: 0 sq mi (0.00 km^{2})
- Elevation: 604 ft (184 m)

Population (2020)
  - Total: 501
  - Density: 202.5/sq mi (78.18/km^{2})
- ZIP code: 47245
- GNIS feature ID: 2587019
- FIPS code: 18-32584

Hayden (also Hardenburg or Six Mile) is an unincorporated community and census-designated place (CDP) in central Spencer Township, Jennings County, Indiana, United States. As of the 2020 census it had a population of 501. It is the birthplace of Edgar Whitcomb, the 43rd Governor of Indiana.

== History ==
Hayden was platted in 1854, the year the Ohio and Mississippi Railroad (later the Baltimore and Ohio Southwestern) reached the site; J. P. Swarthout built the first house and served as the community's first railroad station agent. The settlement was first called Hardenburg and was renamed Hayden in 1889, reportedly because large quantities of hay were shipped from the community; the railroad depot in the center of town served as a community gathering place.

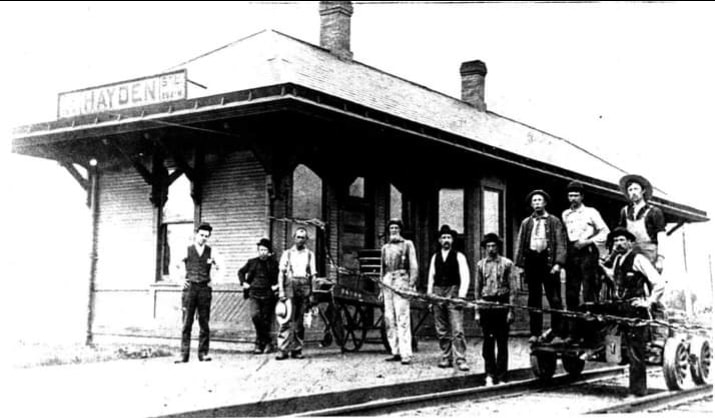
Hayden Depot, before 1900

A carpenter who worked on the town's Methodist church was later identified as a member of the Reno Gang and was among the gang members hanged by a Seymour vigilance committee in 1868.

Hayden is the birthplace of Edgar Whitcomb (1917–2016), the 43rd Governor of Indiana, a World War II veteran, and an author.

The Hayden Historical Museum was organized in 1990, after Whitcomb and his siblings donated a former chicken house and its lot, which volunteers converted into a museum of Hayden and Spencer Township history. The grounds later grew to include a community-center pavilion, built in 1999 with a Lilly Endowment grant, and a reconstructed early-20th-century blacksmith shop. In 2001 the museum acquired the John Doud Sinclair filling station—a 16-by-16-foot (4.9 m × 4.9 m) wood-frame building erected in 1926 and said to be the first gas station between North Vernon and Seymour—donated by its last owner, John Barlow, and relocated from its site at U.S. 50 and County Road 700W to make room for highway turn lanes. The museum's displays include re-created period rooms—a pre-1900 bedroom, a 1933 kitchen, a 1965 living room, and a mid-1950s classroom—depicting daily life in early Jennings and Jackson counties, and it hosts an annual living-history day.

The oldest building in downtown Hayden—a two-story store built in 1875 for James P. Swarthout and long known as the Dodd Store—was destroyed by fire on October 2, 2025.

== Geography ==
It lies along CR700W, west of the town of Vernon, the county seat of Jennings County. U.S. Route 50 passes through the CDP south of the village center; the highway leads northeast 7 miles (11 km) to North Vernon and west 8 miles (13 km) to Seymour.

The Hayden post office has the ZIP code of 47245.

=== Climate ===
The climate in this area is characterized by hot, humid summers and generally mild to cool winters. According to the Köppen Climate Classification system, Hayden has a humid subtropical climate, abbreviated "Cfa" on climate maps.

== Demographics ==
Historical population
Census	Pop.	Note	%±
2020	501		—
U.S. Decennial Census

As of the 2020 census, Hayden had a population of 501. Of those residents, 459 were white, three were Black, four were Native American or Alaskan Native, two were of some other race, and 33 were of two or more races.

== Education ==
Hayden Elementary School, part of the Jennings County School Corporation, serves students from kindergarten through sixth grade. The community was formerly served by a consolidated high school housed in a twelve-room brick building.

== Notable people ==
- Cliff Daringer, Federal League baseball player
- Rolla Daringer, Major League Baseball player
- Mike Simon, Major League Baseball catcher (born in Hayden, 1883)
- Edgar Whitcomb, former governor of Indiana and author
