= Lovett Township, Jennings County, Indiana =

Lovett Township
- Township
- Location in Jennings County
- Coordinates: 38°54′15″N 85°38′29″W
- Country: United States
- State: Indiana
- County: Jennings

Government
  - Type: Indiana township

Area
  - Total: 29.54 sq mi (76.5 km^{2})
  - Land: 29.45 sq mi (76.3 km^{2})
  - Water: 0.09 sq mi (0.23 km^{2}) 0.30%
- Elevation: 702 ft (214 m)

Population (2020)
  - Total: 1,034
  - Density: 35.11/sq mi (13.56/km^{2})
- GNIS feature ID: 0453583

Lovett Township is one of eleven townships in Jennings County, Indiana, United States. As of the 2020 census, its population was 1,034 (down from 1,160 at 2010) and it contained 435 housing units.

Historical population
Census	Pop.	Note	%±
1890	849		—
1900	804		−5.3%
1910	779		−3.1%
1920	699		−10.3%
1930	549		−21.5%
1940	565		2.9%
1950	630		11.5%
1960	675		7.1%
1970	733		8.6%
1980	809		10.4%
1990	768		−5.1%
2000	982		27.9%
2010	1,160		18.1%
2020	1,034		−10.9%
Source: US Decennial Census

== Geography ==
According to the 2010 census, the township has a total area of 29.54 square miles (76.5 km^{2}), of which 29.45 square miles (76.3 km^{2}) (or 99.70%) is land and 0.09 square miles (0.23 km^{2}) (or 0.30%) is water. The streams of Polly Branch and Turkey Run run through this township.

=== Unincorporated towns ===
- Lovett

=== Adjacent townships ===
- Vernon Township (northeast)
- Bigger Township (east)
- Lancaster Township, Jefferson County (east)
- Montgomery Township (south)
- Marion Township (southwest)
- Spencer Township (northwest)

=== Cemeteries ===
The township contains four cemeteries: Green, Marsh, Meek and Weston.

=== Major highways ===
- Indiana State Road 3
- Indiana State Road 7
