= Muscatatuck River =

River in the U.S. state of Indiana

Coordinates: 38°46′26″N 86°09′58″W

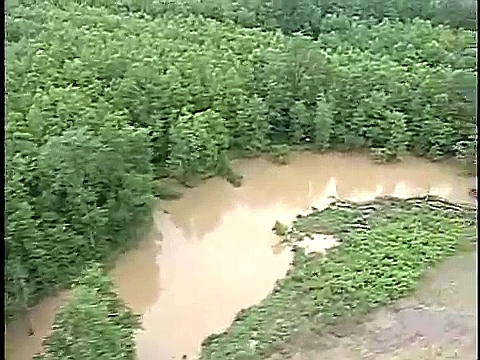
- Aerial view of a bend in the river in the Muscatatuck National Wildlife Refuge

Location
- Country: United States
- State: Indiana

Physical characteristics
- Length: Main Stem: 53.7 miles (86.4 km); Vernon Branch: 88.5 miles (142.4 km)
- Basin size: 1,000 mi^{2} (2,600 km^{2})
- Discharge
  - location: Mouth of Vernon Fork
  - average: 585 cubic feet (16.6 m^{3})

Basin features
- River system: Wabash River

The Muscatatuck River is a 53.7-mile-long (86.4 km) river in south central Indiana, United States. It is a major tributary of the East Fork of the White River and drains 1,000 square miles (2,600 km^{2}). In one area it serves as the southern boundary of the main unit of the Muscatatuck National Wildlife Refuge. It also goes through the Crosley Fish and Wildlife Area and by Muscatatuck County Park.

Below the mouth of the Vernon Fork, the Muscatatuck measures approximately 585 cubic feet (16.6 m^{3}) per second. This figure is arrived at by combining the approximate discharge of the Muscatatuck at Deputy, Indiana, with the approximate discharge of the Vernon Fork Muscatatuck River at Vernon, Indiana.

The path of the Muscatatuck was formed by valley beds created during an ice age. It is believed that the first people arrived and lived by the Muscatatuck around 8000 BC, maintaining permanent structures between 1000 BC and 1000 AD. The first documented Europeans arrived in 1818, although it is possible that squatters lived in the area before Indiana's 1816 statehood.

In the early 20th century, the name of the river was "Muscackituck". It is believed that the original white name was "Muscakituck", written in 1812 by a man named Tipton. Some believe the name comes from the Munsee words for "swamp" and "river".

The 88.5-mile-long (142.4 km) Vernon Fork of the Muscatatuck is a longer branch of the river than the main stem, or southern branch, of the river. The Vernon Fork provides the city of North Vernon with its drinking water, and flows for 59 miles (95 km) of its length in Jennings County. The town of Vernon is nearly surrounded by the Vernon Fork, with only a small neck of dry land that leads to North Vernon.

Before 1830, the Muscatatuck River was navigable, with local settlers being able to ship pork down the river to eventually reach New Orleans. However, around 1830, the river became no longer navigable, as dirt fill accumulated along the river bed. However, some groups "float" along stretches of the river. The Cavanaugh Bridge, which crosses the river southwest of Brownstown, Indiana,. was listed on the National Register of Historic Places in 2007.

Noted Hoosier artist T. C. Steele particularly loved using the Muscatatuck River in his paintings.

== See also ==
- List of rivers of Indiana
