= Muscatatuck County Park =

Recreational park in Indiana, United States

- Type: County
- Nearest town: Vernon, Indiana
- Coordinates: 38°59′26″N 85°37′09″W
- Area: 260.60 acres (105.46 ha)
- Owned by: Jennings County, Indiana

Muscatatuck County Park, formerly known as Vinegar Mills State Park and Muscatatuck State Park, is a recreational park located near the town of Vernon, Indiana, in Jennings County.

Formally opened on May 17, 1921, on land given by Jennings County to the state of Indiana, Vinegar Mills State Park was established as an 86-acre (35 ha) park. It was named for an old mill used to cut stone during the pioneer days along the Muscatatuck River. The name was soon changed to Muscatatuck State Park to reflect the historical Indian name given the river, believed to mean "winding waters".

Aside from a small inn built from a brick house known as the William Read Home that acted as a bed and breakfast, and wood-floored tents, the property was seldom improved upon. It remained a highly forested area popular with travelers between Madison, Indiana, and Indianapolis. While a state park, it was the first to require no financial assistance from the state government, even though it never charged admission despite the strong belief of the founder of the Indiana state park system, Richard Lieber, that it should. However, during the Great Depression, both the Civilian Conservation Corps (CCC) and the Works Progress Administration (WPA) made slight improvements to the property, mostly road work and a fire tower.

The park contained Vinegar Mill (originally known as Stone Mill), a water-powered mill operated by an overshot wheel built in the 1830s but now in ruins. The mill cut building stones used for sills, caps, and steps. Stone cut by the mill may be found, as of 1962, in the Jennings County Courthouse in Vernon. An unnamed source attributes the name "Vinegar Mill" to the mill's apparatus supposed resemblance to a cider press.

In 1962, the state park had an area of 260.60 acres (105.46 ha). Muscatatuck was redesignated as a state game farm in 1956, concentrating on raising quail and pheasant. In 1962, it had the first youth camp in Indiana meant for the general public, and not for convicted youth. In 1968, the land was returned to Jennings County, which operates it as a county park. Although its maintenance suffered for twenty years by a lack of funds, by the 1990s it saw an increase in funds, endowments, and community interest.

The park contains almost 10 miles (16 km) of trails spread among five routes. Mountain biking is permitted on most trails, with three levels of difficulty available.

Muscatatuck County Park is a separate entity from the nearby Muscatatuck National Wildlife Refuge.
