= Brewersville, Indiana =

- Unincorporated community
- Location within Indiana Location within the United States
- Coordinates: 39°05′04″N 85°36′42″W
- Country: United States
- State: Indiana
- County: Jennings
- Township: Sand Creek
- Elevation: 696 ft (212 m)
- ZIP code: 47265
- FIPS code: 18-07444
- GNIS feature ID: 431498

Brewersville is an unincorporated community in Sand Creek Township, Jennings County, Indiana.

== History ==
Brewersville was founded in 1837 by Jacob Brewer, and named for him. A post office was established at Brewersville in 1844, and remained in operation until it was discontinued in 1931.
