= Uniontown, Jackson County, Indiana =

- Unincorporated community
- Location within Indiana Location within the United States
- Coordinates: 38°50′45″N 85°49′33″W
- Country: United States
- State: Indiana
- County: Jackson
- Township: Vernon
- Elevation: 574 ft (175 m)
- ZIP code: 47229
- FIPS code: 18-77840
- GNIS feature ID: 445138

Uniontown is an unincorporated community in Vernon Township, Jackson County, Indiana.

Uniontown was platted in 1859.

== Geography ==
Uniontown is located on U.S. Route 31 and State Road 250. It also has an exit from Interstate 65.
