= Austin, Indiana =

- City
- City of Austin
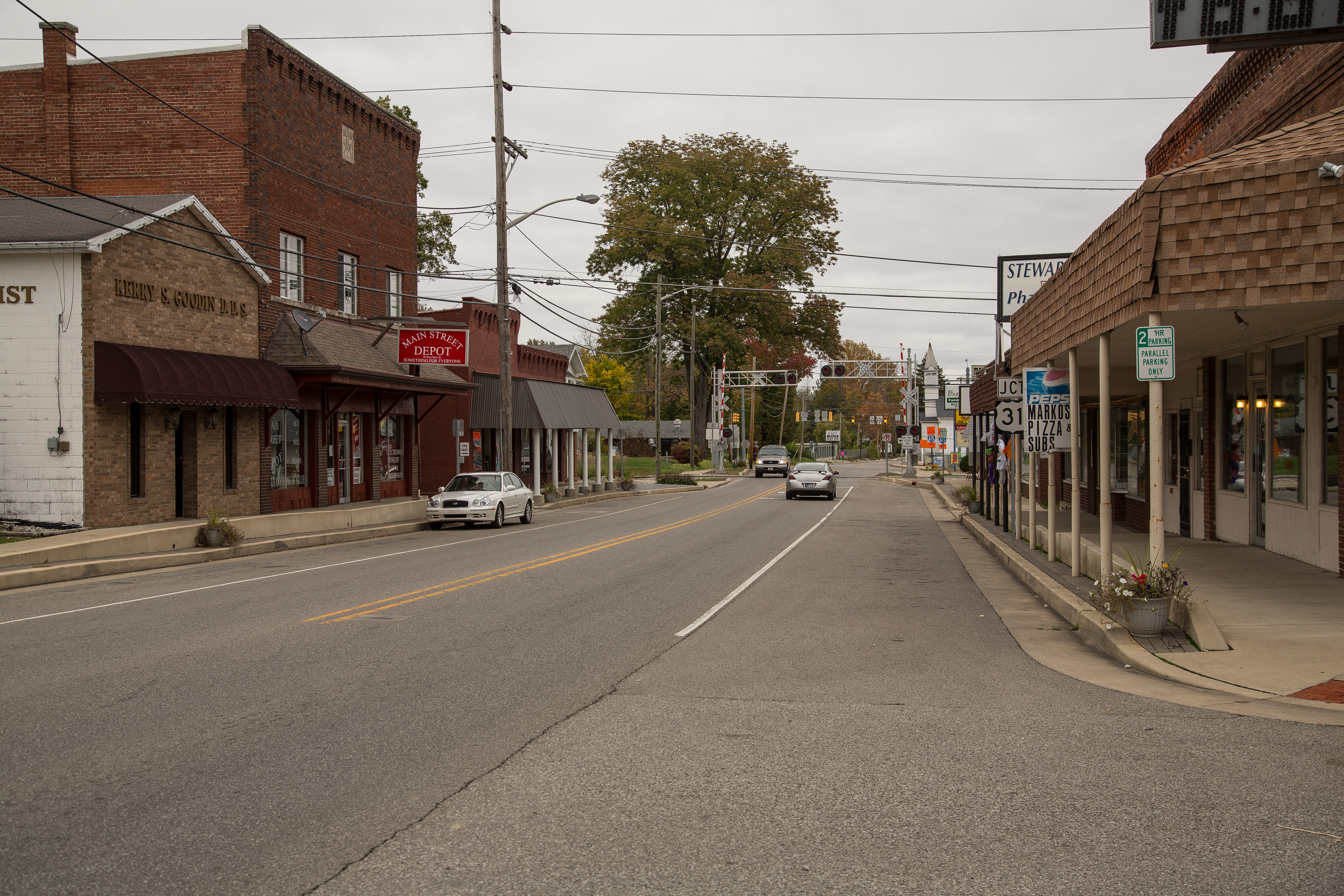

- Seal Logo

- Location of Austin in Scott County, Indiana.
- Coordinates: 38°44′50″N 85°48′30″W
- Country: United States
- State: Indiana
- County: Scott
- Township: Jennings
- Platted: 1853
- Incorporated (city): January 1, 2008

Government
  - Mayor: Roger Hawkins (D)
  - City Council: Joe Smith; Brandon White

Area
  - Total: 2.66 sq mi (6.90 km^{2})
  - Land: 2.66 sq mi (6.90 km^{2})
  - Water: 0 sq mi (0.00 km^{2})
- Elevation: 558 ft (170 m)

Population (2020)
  - Total: 4,064
  - Density: 1,525.7/sq mi (589.09/km^{2})
- Time zone: UTC−5 (EST)
  - Summer (DST): UTC−5 (EST)
- ZIP code: 47102
- Area code: 812
- FIPS code: 18-02800
- GNIS ID: 2397445
- Website: cityofaustin.in.gov

Austin is a city in Jennings Township, Scott County, in the U.S. state of Indiana. The population was 4,064 at the 2020 census, at which time it was a town; Austin became a city on January 1, 2008. The population was 4,064 at the 2020 census.

== History ==
Austin was platted in 1853, and named after Austin, Texas. A post office has been in operation at Austin since 1854.

=== HIV Crisis ===
The federal Centers for Disease Control and Prevention confirms that Austin “contains the largest drug-fueled H.I.V. outbreak to hit rural America in recent history.” Its 5 percent infection rate “is comparable to some African nations.” According to New York Times columnist Thomas Friedman, who visited with Austin's only doctor, Will Cooke, Austin "doesn’t just sit at the intersection between Indianapolis and Louisville but at the intersection of hopelessness and economic ruin.”

In 2015, press reports indicated the city was the center of an outbreak of HIV caused by the use of Opana as an injectable recreational drug. The outbreak required emergency action by state officials. When the outbreak was first detected there were 30 HIV cases in a town that had, up until this point, only had 3 cases over several decades. After 29 days, by the time Governor Mike Pence determined a course of action, the number of HIV cases had skyrocketed to 79. In response to the crisis Scott County established "one-stop shop," where people could also get drug treatment referrals, free HIV testing, syringe exchanges, and other services.

== Geography ==
According to the 2010 census, Austin has a total area of 2.58 square miles (6.68 km^{2}), all land.

=== Climate ===
The climate in this area is characterized by hot, humid summers and generally mild to cool winters. According to the Köppen Climate Classification system, Austin has a humid subtropical climate, abbreviated "Cfa" on climate maps.

== Demographics ==
Historical population
Census	Pop.	Note	%±
1870	321		—
1880	270		−15.9%
1950	2,906		—
1960	3,838		32.1%
1970	4,902		27.7%
1980	4,857		−0.9%
1990	4,310		−11.3%
2000	4,724		9.6%
2010	4,295		−9.1%
2020	4,064		−5.4%
U.S. Decennial Census

=== 2020 census ===
As of the 2020 census, Austin had a population of 4,064. The median age was 37.3 years. 24.1% of residents were under the age of 18 and 14.7% of residents were 65 years of age or older. For every 100 females there were 95.9 males, and for every 100 females age 18 and over there were 96.1 males age 18 and over.

0.0% of residents lived in urban areas, while 100.0% lived in rural areas.

There were 1,621 households in Austin, of which 31.3% had children under the age of 18 living in them. Of all households, 37.8% were married-couple households, 21.7% were households with a male householder and no spouse or partner present, and 30.0% were households with a female householder and no spouse or partner present. About 28.5% of all households were made up of individuals and 10.7% had someone living alone who was 65 years of age or older.

There were 1,820 housing units, of which 10.9% were vacant. The homeowner vacancy rate was 2.0% and the rental vacancy rate was 6.7%.

Racial composition as of the 2020 census
Race	Number	Percent
White	3,756	92.4%
Black or African American	29	0.7%
American Indian and Alaska Native	5	0.1%
Asian	12	0.3%
Native Hawaiian and Other Pacific Islander	2	0.0%
Some other race	48	1.2%
Two or more races	212	5.2%
Hispanic or Latino (of any race)	110	2.7%

=== 2010 census ===
As of the 2010 census, there were 4,295 people, 1,674 households, and 1,178 families residing in the city. The population density was 1,664.7 inhabitants per square mile (642.7/km^{2}). There were 1,908 housing units at an average density of 739.5 per square mile (285.5/km^{2}). The racial makeup of the city was 97.1% White, 0.3% African American, 0.3% Native American, 0.2% Asian, 0.7% from other races, and 1.2% from two or more races. Hispanic or Latino of any race were 2.1% of the population.

There were 1,674 households, of which 37.2% had children under the age of 18 living with them, 43.2% were married couples living together, 18.8% had a female householder with no husband present, 8.4% had a male householder with no wife present, and 29.6% were non-families. 25.4% of all households were made up of individuals, and 9.2% had someone living alone who was 65 years of age or older. The average household size was 2.56 and the average family size was 3.00.

The median age in the city was 36.7 years. 25.9% of residents were under the age of 18; 9.7% were between the ages of 18 and 24; 27% were from 25 to 44; 25.3% were from 45 to 64; and 12.3% were 65 years of age or older. The gender makeup of the city was 48.6% male and 51.4% female.

=== 2000 census ===
As of the 2000 census, there were 4,724 people, 1,793 households, and 1,308 families residing in the town. The population density was 1,946.4 inhabitants per square mile (751.5/km^{2}). There were 1,967 housing units at an average density of 810.5 per square mile (312.9/km^{2}). The racial makeup of the town was 98.20% White, 0.06% African American, 0.15% Native American, 0.19% Asian, 0.78% from other races, and 0.61% from two or more races. Hispanic or Latino of any race were 1.52% of the population.

There were 1,793 households, out of which 36.8% had children under the age of 18 living with them, 51.0% were married couples living together, 16.8% had a female householder with no husband present, and 27.0% were non-families. 22.6% of all households were made up of individuals, and 8.3% had someone living alone who was 65 years of age or older. The average household size was 2.63 and the average family size was 3.06.

In the town the population was spread out, with 29.1% under the age of 18, 10.5% from 18 to 24, 30.0% from 25 to 44, 20.6% from 45 to 64, and 9.8% who were 65 years of age or older. The median age was 32 years. For every 100 females, there were 97.4 males. For every 100 females age 18 and over, there were 95.4 males.

The median income for a household in the town was $28,495, and the median income for a family was $33,267. Males had a median income of $28,468 versus $21,580 for females. The per capita income for the town was $12,431. About 16.6% of families and 19.1% of the population were below the poverty line, including 29.0% of those under age 18 and 15.6% of those age 65 or over.

== Notable residents ==
- Albert E. Wiggam - Psychologist and eugenicist
