= Washington Township, Jackson County, Indiana =

Washington Township
- Township
- Location in Jackson County
- Coordinates: 38°52′11″N 85°54′06″W
- Country: United States
- State: Indiana
- County: Jackson

Government
  - Type: Indiana township

Area
  - Total: 35.87 sq mi (92.9 km^{2})
  - Land: 35.86 sq mi (92.9 km^{2})
  - Water: 0.01 sq mi (0.026 km^{2}) 0.03%
- Elevation: 564 ft (172 m)

Population (2020)
  - Total: 1,231
  - Density: 34.33/sq mi (13.25/km^{2})
- GNIS feature ID: 0454001

Washington Township is one of twelve townships in Jackson County, Indiana, United States. As of the 2020 census, its population was 1,231 and it contained 477 housing units.

Historical population
Census	Pop.	Note	%±
1890	899		—
1900	953		6.0%
1910	862		−9.5%
1920	799		−7.3%
1930	744		−6.9%
1940	738		−0.8%
1950	683		−7.5%
1960	771		12.9%
1970	923		19.7%
1980	908		−1.6%
1990	967		6.5%
2000	1,068		10.4%
2010	1,122		5.1%
2020	1,231		9.7%
Source: US Decennial Census

== Geography ==
According to the 2010 census, the township has a total area of 35.87 square miles (92.9 km^{2}), of which 35.86 square miles (92.9 km^{2}) (or 99.97%) is land and 0.01 square miles (0.026 km^{2}) (or 0.03%) is water. The stream of Horse Lick runs through this township.

=== Unincorporated towns ===
- Dudleytown

=== Extinct towns ===
- Chestnut Ridge

=== Adjacent townships ===
- Jackson Township (north)
- Spencer Township, Jennings County (northeast)
- Marion Township, Jennings County (east)
- Vernon Township (southeast)
- Grassy Fork Township (southwest)
- Brownstown Township (west)

=== Cemeteries ===
The township contains one cemetery, Chestnut Ridge.

=== Major highways ===
- Interstate 65
- Indiana State Road 11
- Indiana State Road 250
