= Grayford, Indiana =

- Unincorporated community and Census-designated place
- Location within Indiana Location within the United States
- Coordinates: 38°57′48″N 85°34′40″W
- Country: United States
- State: Indiana
- County: Jennings
- Township: Vernon
- Elevation: 745 ft (227 m)
- ZIP code: 47265
- FIPS code: 18-29070
- GNIS feature ID: 2830423

Grayford is an unincorporated community in Vernon Township, Jennings County, Indiana.

The first post office in Grayford was called Butler's Switch. It was established in 1875, and was renamed Grayford in 1889. The post office closed in 1922.

== Demographics ==
The United States Census Bureau delineated Grayford as a census designated place in the 2022 American Community Survey.
