= Nebraska, Indiana =

- Unincorporated community
- Location within Indiana Location within the United States
- Coordinates: 39°03′49″N 85°27′34″W
- Country: United States
- State: Indiana
- County: Jennings
- Township: Campbell
- Elevation: 853 ft (260 m)
- ZIP code: 47223
- FIPS code: 18-52128
- GNIS feature ID: 439964

Nebraska is an unincorporated community in Campbell Township, Jennings County, Indiana.

== History ==
Nebraska was platted in 1856, and was likely named for the Nebraska Territory, a hot political topic of the day. The Nebraska post office was discontinued in 2002.
