= Columbia Township, Jennings County, Indiana =

Columbia Township
- Township
- Location in Jennings County
- Coordinates: 39°07′03″N 85°29′34″W
- Country: United States
- State: Indiana
- County: Jennings

Government
  - Type: Indiana township

Area
  - Total: 39.49 sq mi (102.3 km^{2})
  - Land: 39.48 sq mi (102.3 km^{2})
  - Water: 0.02 sq mi (0.052 km^{2}) 0.05%
- Elevation: 810 ft (247 m)

Population (2020)
  - Total: 920
  - Density: 23/sq mi (9.0/km^{2})
- GNIS feature ID: 0453241

Columbia Township is one of eleven townships in Jennings County, Indiana, United States. As of the 2020 census, its population was 920 (up from 868 at 2010) and it contained 406 housing units.

Columbia Township was established in 1817.

Historical population
Census	Pop.	Note	%±
1890	1,244		—
1900	1,195		−3.9%
1910	1,000		−16.3%
1920	944		−5.6%
1930	746		−21.0%
1940	775		3.9%
1950	777		0.3%
1960	751		−3.3%
1970	737		−1.9%
1980	774		5.0%
1990	813		5.0%
2000	759		−6.6%
2010	868		14.4%
2020	920		6.0%
Source: US Decennial Census

== Geography ==
According to the 2010 census, the township has a total area of 39.49 square miles (102.3 km^{2}), of which 39.48 square miles (102.3 km^{2}) (or 99.97%) is land and 0.02 square miles (0.052 km^{2}) (or 0.05%) is water. The streams of Square Run and Wolf Creek run through this township.

=== Unincorporated towns ===
- Zenas

=== Adjacent townships ===
- Marion Township, Decatur County (north)
- Jackson Township, Ripley County (northeast)
- Otter Creek Township, Ripley County (east)
- Campbell Township (south)
- Sand Creek Township (west)
- Sand Creek Township, Decatur County (northwest)

=== Cemeteries ===
The township contains three cemeteries: Cornell, Old Zenas, and Zenas.
