= Dudleytown, Indiana =

- Unincorporated community
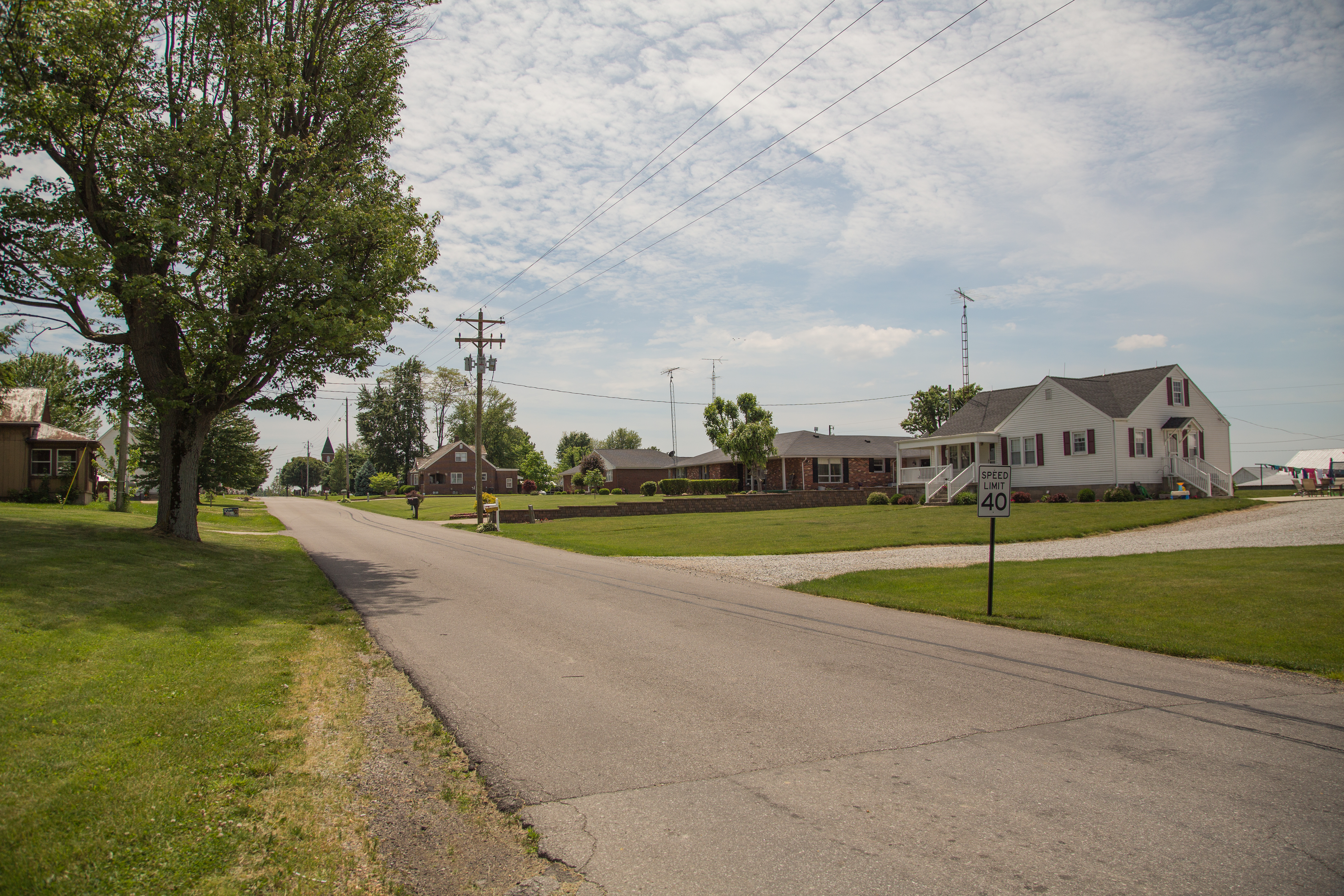

- Location within Indiana Location within the United States
- Coordinates: 38°50′59″N 85°53′59″W
- Country: United States
- State: Indiana
- County: Jackson
- Township: Washington
- Elevation: 604 ft (184 m)
- ZIP code: 47274
- FIPS code: 18-18856
- GNIS feature ID: 433752

Dudleytown is an unincorporated community in Washington Township, Jackson County, Indiana.

== History ==
Dudleytown was laid out in 1837 by James Dudley, and named for him. It was the third town platted in Jackson County. Dudleytown was settled as a center for trade in the Washington Township area. It was then located on a heavily traveled thoroughfare between Louisville and Indianapolis.
