= The Retreat (disambiguation) =

The Retreat is a mental-health facility in York, England.

The Retreat may also refer to:

== Film and television ==
- The Retreat (2020 film), an American horror film
- The Retreat (2021 film), a Canadian slasher film
- "The Retreat" (She-Hulk: Attorney at Law), a 2022 television episode

== Literature ==
- The Retreat (Rambaud novel), a 2000 novel by Patrick Rambaud
- The Retreat (Bergen novel), a 2008 novel by David Bergen
- The Retreat (Jones book), a 2009 book by Michael Jones

== Places and structures ==
- The Retreat, Ryde, a heritage-listed building in New South Wales, Australia
- The Retreat Building, an official residence of the President of India, in Shimla, Himachal Pradesh
- The Retreat at Twin Lakes, a gated community in Sanford, Florida, US
- Kelmscott House, originally The Retreat, a historic building in London, England

== See also ==
- Retreat (disambiguation)
