= Walnut Ridge, Indiana =

- Unincorporated community
- Location within Indiana Location within the United States
- Coordinates: 38°55′30″N 85°33′22″W
- Country: United States
- State: Indiana
- County: Jennings
- Township: Vernon
- Elevation: 768 ft (234 m)
- ZIP code: 47265
- FIPS code: 18-79946
- GNIS feature ID: 445437

Walnut Ridge is an unincorporated community in Vernon Township, Jennings County, Indiana.
