= Retreat, Indiana =

- Unincorporated community
- Location within Indiana Location within the United States
- Coordinates: 38°49′28″N 85°51′12″W
- Country: United States
- State: Indiana
- County: Jackson
- Township: Vernon
- Elevation: 532 ft (162 m)
- ZIP code: 47229
- FIPS code: 18-63864
- GNIS feature ID: 441917

Retreat is an unincorporated community in Vernon Township, Jackson County, Indiana.

== History ==
Retreat first grew around a sawmill which was built there in about 1850.
