= TREAT-NMD =

Global academic network

- Translational Research in Europe - Assessment and Treatment of Neuromuscular diseases
- Keywords: Neuromuscular diseases, clinical research
- Project type: Network of Excellence
- Funding agency: European Commission
- Reference: FP6-036825
- Objective: Improving trial-readiness worldwide, advancing patient diagnosis and care and accelerating pre-clinical research
- Project coordinator: Institute of Genetic Medicine, Newcastle University
- Participants: Universities, pharmaceutical companies, patient organisations
- Website: www.treat-nmd.org

TREAT-NMD (Translational Research in Europe, Assessment and Treatment for NeuroMuscular Disorders) is a global academic network that focuses on advancing research in neuromuscular disorders. It was established in 2007 with its coordination centre at the Newcastle University. As of 2018, the network comprises over a hundred research centres and patient organisations from 54 countries as well as independent academics and patient representatives. The network's aim is to provide infrastructure to accelerating research through supporting collaboration between its members. Its main goals include improving trial-readiness worldwide, advancing patient diagnosis and care and accelerating pre-clinical research.

Through patient registries, TREAT-NMD provides genotype–phenotype correlation between genetic mutations and neuromuscular disease burden.
