= Albert E. Wiggam =

American psychologist and eugenicist

Albert Edward Wiggam
- Albert E. Wiggam in 1940
- Born: October 8, 1871; Austin, Indiana, U.S.
- Died: April 26, 1957 (aged 85); California, U.S.
- Education: Hanover College 1903
- Occupation: Psychologist
- Notable work: The New Decalogue of Science; The Fruit of the Family Tree
- Spouse(s): Elizabeth M. Jayne (1902–); Helen Scott Holcombe (1944–1957)
- Parent(s): Harriet Small Jackson Wiggam; John Wiggam

Albert Edward Wiggam (October 8, 1871 – April 26, 1957) was an American psychologist and eugenicist. He was called "one of the most influential promoters of eugenic thought" and a "gifted showman," which made him a popular lecturer.

== Early life and education ==
Albert Wiggam was born in Austin, Indiana, on October 8, 1871. His parents were Harriet Small Jackson and John Wiggam. Wiggam earned two degrees at Hanover College: a Bachelor of Science in 1893 and a Master of Arts in 1903.

== Career ==
After college, Wiggam worked as a newspaper reporter, writing for the Minneapolis Journal, and as an assayer at a mine. In 1896, he moved to Denver, Colorado, where he operated a greenhouse. He became the first person to telegraph flowers. He sold the business within a year.

He received an honorary degree from Colgate University in 1929 and 1932. Wiggam wrote the syndicated psychology column "Let's Explore Your Mind". He served as president of the Association for the Study of Human Heredity. As of 1939, Wiggam and Elizabeth were living in New York while spending the summer at their second home in Vernon, Indiana.

=== Eugenics ===
Wiggam became a lecturer for the Chautauqua Institution in 1901. On April 9, 1902, he married Elizabeth M. Jayne. He also was a lecturer on biology and heredity at the University of Wisconsin. He left Chautauqua in 1919.

In 1925, Wiggam completed The New Decalogue of Science, a pro-eugenics book. The book, and subsequent works by Wiggam, were republished every few years and were popular sellers. In The New Decalogue, Wiggam called eugenics a "new social and political Bible." He quoted Bible passages that he thought reflected eugenic beliefs.

Wiggam's eugenics works and lectures focused on urban environments and individuality versus the rural nuclear families (the latter were more common in the eugenics canon). He considered individuality and personal improvement as an opportunity to improve one's social, moral and economic success.

Wiggam also supported "permanent race improvement" and believed that Americans of Nordic heritage were superior to others. He believed that economically successful people had "good" genes and that African Americans, criminals and immigrants did not have "good" genes. Wiggam did believe that African Americans were better than African people living in Africa. He believes that Black people could not perform "higher integrative processes of the nervous system."

He also believes that men were superior to women. He believed that the greatest achievement women, specifically women of Nordic heritage, could achieve was having "well born" children.

== Later life and death ==
He received an honorary degree from the University of Vermont in 1944. In 1944, he married Helen Scott Holcombe.

He died on April 26, 1957, in California.

== Works by Albert E. Wiggam ==
- The New Decalogue of Science. Indianapolis: The Bobbs-Merrill Company, 1923.
- The Fruit of the Family Tree. Indianapolis: The Bobbs-Merrill company, 1924.
- The Next Age of Man. Indianapolis: The Bobbs-Merrill company, 1927.
- Exploring Your Mind With the Psychologists. New York: Blue Ribbon books, 1928.
- The Marks of an Educated Man. Indianapolis: Bobbs-Merrill company, 1930.
- The Marks of a Clear Mind; Or, Sorry but You're Wrong About It. New York City: Blue Ribbon Books, 1933.
- New Techniques of Happiness. New York: W. Funk, 1948.
