= Paris Crossing, Indiana =

- Unincorporated community and Census-designated place
- Location within Indiana Location within the United States
- Coordinates: 38°49′46″N 85°38′53″W
- Country: United States
- State: Indiana
- County: Jennings
- Township: Montgomery
- Elevation: 617 ft (188 m)
- ZIP code: 47270
- GNIS feature ID: 2830424

Paris Crossing is an unincorporated community in southern Montgomery Township, Jennings County, Indiana, United States. It lies along State Road 250, south of the town of Vernon, the county seat of Jennings County. Although Paris Crossing is unincorporated, it has a post office, with the ZIP code of 47270.

== History ==
Paris Crossing was named from the location by the railroad outside of Paris, Indiana. The Paris Crossing post office was established in 1876.

== Demographics ==
The United States Census Bureau defined Paris Crossing as a census designated place in the 2022 American Community Survey.
