= Lovett, Indiana =

- Unincorporated community
- Location within Indiana Location within the United States
- Coordinates: 38°54′41″N 85°37′59″W
- Country: United States
- State: Indiana
- County: Jennings
- Township: Lovett
- Elevation: 705 ft (215 m)
- ZIP code: 47265
- FIPS code: 18-45090
- GNIS feature ID: 438350

Lovett is an unincorporated community in Lovett Township, Jennings County, Indiana.

== History ==
Lovett was platted in 1855. A post office was established at Lovett in 1870, and remained in operation until it was discontinued in 1934.
