= Treat (name) =

Notable people named Treat include:

== Given name ==
- Treat Huey (born 1985), American tennis player
- Treat Baldwin Johnson (1875–1947), American chemist
- Treat Williams (1951–2023), American actor

== Surname ==
- Charles H. Treat (1842–1910), American politician, son of Nathaniel Treat
- Cornelius Mortimer Treat (1817–1916), American politician
- Herb Treat (c. 1900–1947), American football player
- Howell B. Treat (1833–1912), American Civil War soldier awarded the Medal of Honor
- John Whittier Treat, Professor of East Asian Languages and Literature at Yale University
- Joseph B. Treat (1836–1919), American politician
- Lawrence Treat (1903–1998), American mystery writer
- Mary Treat (1830–1923), American naturalist
- Nathaniel Treat (1798–1894), American politician, father of Charles Treat
- Nathaniel B. Treat (1839–1930), American businessman and politician
- Payson J. Treat (1879–1973), American Japanologist
- Richard Treat (1584–1669), American early settler
- Robert Treat (1622–1710), American politician
- Roger Treat (1906–1969), American writer
- Samuel Treat (1815–1902), American judge from Missouri
- Samuel Hubbel Treat Jr. (1811–1887), American judge from Illinois
- Sharon Treat (born 1956), American politician and attorney
