= Cliff Daringer =

American baseball player (1885–1971)

- Infielder
- Born: April 10, 1885; Hayden, Indiana, US
- Died: December 26, 1971 (aged 86); Sacramento, California, US
- Batted: Left Threw: Right

MLB debut
- April 20, 1914, for the Kansas City Packers

Last MLB appearance
- September 29, 1914, for the Kansas City Packers

MLB statistics
- Batting average: .263
- Hits: 42
- Stolen bases: 9
- Stats at Baseball Reference

Teams
- Kansas City Packers (1914)

Clifford Clarence Daringer (April 10, 1885 – December 26, 1971) was an American Major League Baseball infielder who played for one season. He played in 64 games for the Kansas City Packers during their 1914 season. He was the older brother of Rolla Daringer.

Born on April 10, 1885, Daringer was one of ten children born to Lorenzo Dow Daringer (1844–1892) and Margaret Ann Carr (1847–1940). His father served in the 6th Indiana Infantry during the Civil War and was wounded three times during battle. He died due to complications from these injuries.

Daringer made his Major League debut on April 20, 1914, vs. the Indianapolis Hoosiers, getting two hits in two at-bats, as well as his first Major League RBI against George Kaiserling. After a sub-par season in which he received only 186 plate appearances, Daringer was released by the Packers.

Daringer was also in the starting lineup against the Chicago Whales in the first game in Weegham Park, now known as Wrigley Field. He went 0–3.

He married Alice Freeney in 1914 and moved to Sacramento, California in 1917, where he lived until his death on December 26, 1971.

Part of a notorious baseball family, his brother, Howard, was an outfielder for many years in the Illinois-Indiana-Iowa League, while another brother, Rolla, was a two-year Major League shortstop for the St. Louis Cardinals. He also had a fourth cousin, Paul Derringer, who won 223 games over a 15-year career with the Cardinals, Cincinnati Reds, and Chicago Cubs from 1931 to 1945.
