= Walnut Ridge High School =

Walnut Ridge High School may refer to:

- Walnut Ridge High School (Arkansas), located in Walnut Ridge, Arkansas.
- Walnut Ridge High School (Columbus, Ohio), located in Columbus, Ohio.
