= Butlerville, Indiana =

- Census-designated place
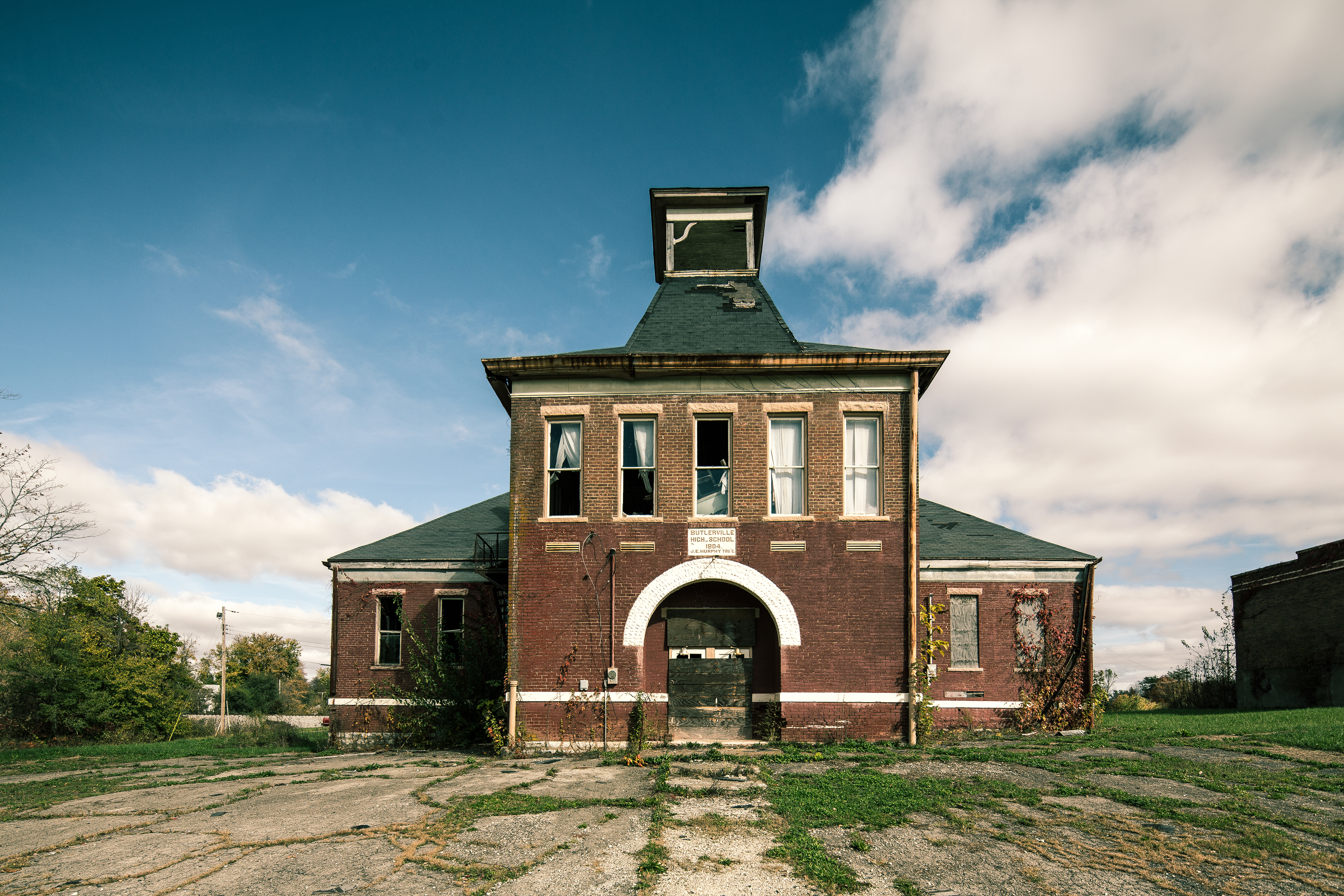
- The abandoned Butlerville High School

- Location of Butlerville in Jennings County, Indiana

- Location within Indiana Location within the United States
- Coordinates: 39°01′57″N 85°30′47″W
- Country: United States
- State: Indiana
- County: Jennings
- Township: Campbell

Area
  - Total: 0.37 sq mi (0.97 km^{2})
  - Land: 0.37 sq mi (0.97 km^{2})
  - Water: 0 sq mi (0.00 km^{2})
- Elevation: 807 ft (246 m)

Population (2020)
  - Total: 300
  - Density: 804.9/sq mi (310.76/km^{2})
- ZIP code: 47223
- GNIS feature ID: 2587013
- FIPS code: 18-09622

Butlerville is an unincorporated community and census-designated place (CDP) in central Campbell Township, Jennings County, Indiana, United States. As of the 2020 census, Butlerville had a population of 300.

== History ==
The Butlerville post office was established in 1851. An early settler being a former resident of Butlerville, Ohio, caused the name to be selected. Butlerville was legally platted in 1853.

Hannah Milhous Nixon, mother of President Richard Nixon, was born near Butlerville.

The community was home to Butlerville High School, home of the Bulldogs; which graduated classes from ~1910 thru 1950. Today, the community is serviced by Jennings County High School.

== Geography ==
Butlerville lies along U.S. Route 50, 7 miles (11 km) east-northeast of the town of Vernon, the county seat of Jennings County.

Although Butlerville is unincorporated, it has a post office, with the ZIP code of 47223.

The community is bordered to the west by Southeast Purdue Agricultural Center.

== Demographics ==
Historical population
Census	Pop.	Note	%±
2020	300		—
U.S. Decennial Census
