= Commiskey, Indiana =

- Unincorporated community and Census-designated place
- Location within Indiana Location within the United States
- Coordinates: 38°51′38″N 85°38′35″W
- Country: United States
- State: Indiana
- County: Jennings
- Township: Montgomery
- Elevation: 692 ft (211 m)
- ZIP code: 47227
- GNIS feature ID: 2830422

Commiskey is an unincorporated community in central Montgomery Township, Jennings County, Indiana, United States. It lies along local roads just west of State Road 3, south of the town of Vernon, the county seat of Jennings County. Although Commiskey is unincorporated, it has a post office, with the ZIP code of 47227.

== History ==
Commiskey was platted in 1870. A post office was opened in Commiskey in 1870, and remains in operation.

== Demographics ==
The United States Census Bureau delineated Commiskey as a census designated place in the 2022 American Community Survey.
