= Rolla Daringer =

American baseball player (1888–1974)

- Shortstop
- Born: November 15, 1888; Hayden, Indiana, U.S.
- Died: May 23, 1974 (aged 85); Seymour, Indiana, U.S.
- Batted: Left Threw: Right

MLB debut
- September 19, 1914, for the St. Louis Cardinals

Last MLB appearance
- April 23, 1915, for the St. Louis Cardinals

MLB statistics
- Games played: 12
- At bats: 27
- Hits: 4
- Stats at Baseball Reference

Teams
- St. Louis Cardinals (1914–1915)

Rolla Harrison Daringer (November 15, 1888 – May 23, 1974) was an American shortstop in Major League Baseball. He played for the St. Louis Cardinals. Younger brother of Cliff Daringer.

In 1909, Daringer's baseball career started with four seasons in Dubuqua, when St. Louis signed him towards the end of the 1914 season, where he played until the end of the 1915 season. He then played American League ball for the duration of his career (1916–1921), taking a break when he joined the Army for World War I in 1918.
