= Queensville, Indiana =

- Unincorporated community
- Location within Indiana Location within the United States
- Coordinates: 39°03′04″N 85°40′38″W
- Country: United States
- State: Indiana
- County: Jennings
- Township: Geneva
- Elevation: 676 ft (206 m)
- ZIP code: 47265
- FIPS code: 18-62550
- GNIS feature ID: 441693

Queensville is an unincorporated community in Geneva Township, Jennings County, Indiana.

== History ==
Queensville was originally called Lynnville, and under the latter name was laid out in 1848. In 1855 the village adopted the name Queensville.

A post office was established at Queensville in 1847, and remained in operation until it was discontinued in 1927.
