= Paris, Indiana =

Unincorporated community in Indiana, U.S.

Coordinates: 38°49′27″N 85°38′02″W

Paris is an unincorporated community in Jefferson and Jennings counties, Indiana, in the United States.

== History ==
A post office called Paris was established in 1820, and remained in operation until it was discontinued in 1841. The community was named for Paris, in France.
