= Jennings Township, Scott County, Indiana =

Jennings Township
- Township
- Coordinates: 38°45′54″N 85°46′53″W
- Country: United States
- State: Indiana
- County: Scott

Government
  - Type: Indiana township

Area
  - Total: 31.23 sq mi (80.9 km^{2})
  - Land: 31.17 sq mi (80.7 km^{2})
  - Water: 0.06 sq mi (0.16 km^{2})
- Elevation: 597 ft (182 m)

Population (2020)
  - Total: 6,437
- FIPS code: 18-38448
- GNIS feature ID: 453509

Jennings Township is one of five townships in Scott County, Indiana. In the 2020 US Census it had 6,437 people.

== Geography ==
According to the 2010 census, the township has a total area of 31.23 square miles (80.9 km^{2}), of which 31.17 square miles (80.7 km^{2}) (or 99.81%) is land and 0.06 square miles (0.16 km^{2}) (or 0.19%) is water.

== Demography ==
Historical population
Census	Pop.	Note	%±
2000	6,997		—
2010	6,633		−5.2%
2020	6,437		−3.0%

As of the 2010 census, its population was 6,633 and it contained 2,860 housing units.

=== Cities and towns ===
- Austin
