= List of Indiana state historical markers in Scott County =

Location of Scott County in Indiana

This is a list of the Indiana state historical markers in Scott County.

This is intended to be a complete list of the official state historical markers placed in Scott County, Indiana, United States by the Indiana Historical Bureau. The locations of the historical markers and their latitude and longitude coordinates are included below when available, along with their names, years of placement, and topics as recorded by the Historical Bureau. There are 16 historical markers located in Scott County.

== Historical markers ==
| Marker title | Image | Year placed | Location | Topics |
|---|---|---|---|---|
| Morgan's Raid July 8–13, 1863 | | 1963 | Along State Road 203 near the eastern edge of the school on the town square in Lexington; 38°39′10.2″N 85°37′32.6″W | Military |
| Site of William Hayden English Home | | 1992 | Along the western side of State Road 203 on the northern edge of Lexington at the entrance to the drive to Englishton Park; 38°39′33″N 85°37′42.4″W | Politics, Arts and Culture |
| Site of Western Eagle | | 1992 | Junction of Main and Mulberry Streets in Lexington; 38°39′5.8″N 85°37′35.2″W | Newspapers and Media |
| Scott County Courthouse | | 2001 | 1 E. McClain Avenue in Scottsburg; 38°41′8″N 85°46′11″W | Government Institutions, Buildings and Architecture |
| John Kimberlin Farm | | 2001 | 5765 S. Westport Road (0.2 miles northwest of State Road 362) near Nabb; 38°36′30″N 85°38′12″W | Early Settlement and Exploration, Military |
| Scott County's Carnegie Library | | 2002 | 108 S. Main Street in Scottsburg; 38°41′4.5″N 85°46′14″W | Carnegie Library, Buildings and Architecture |
| Scott County Home | | 2002 | 1050 S. Main Street in Scottsburg; 38°40′25″N 85°46′14″W | Government Institutions, Buildings and Architecture |
| Lexington First County Seat | | 2002 | Main Street (State Road 356) at the southern edge of the school in Lexington; 38°39′8.2″N 85°37′32″W | Government Institutions, Historic District, Neighborhoods, and Towns |
| Scottsburg Depot | | 2002 | 90 N. Main Street in Scottsburg; 38°41′12″N 85°46′17″W | Transportation, Business, Industry, and Labor |
| Northern Boundary of Clark's Grant | | 2002 | Northwestern corner of the junction of State Road 3 with Kinderhook Road (Section 296 of Clark's Grant), 3 miles northwest of Naab; 38°37′38″N 85°40′58″W | Early Settlement and Exploration, Historic District, Neighborhoods, and Towns, Government Institutions |
| Lake Iola Interurban Site | | 2002 | Eastern shore of Lake Iola at William H. Graham Park along N. Bond Street in Scottsburg; 38°41′44″N 85°46′26″W | Transportation, Business, Industry, and Labor |
| Morgan's Raid, July 1863 | | 2002 | Southern side of State Road 356 at its crossing of the Louisville and Indiana Railroad line, 0.2 miles east of the U.S. Route 31 junction, near Vienna; 38°38′55.6″N 85°46′15.4″W | Military |
| Marshfield Train Robbery | | 2002 | Junction of U.S. Route 31 and Terrell Road, south of the overspan railroad bridge and W. Morgan, and north of the city limits of Scottsburg; 38°42′41″N 85°47′6″W | Transportation |
| Town of Austin | | 2002 | Southwestern corner of the junction of U.S. Route 31 and W. Morgan Street in Austin; 38°44′46″N 85°48′25.4″W | Historic District, Neighborhoods, and Towns, Military, Transportation |
| Joseph Hooker Shea | | 2003 | 8060 E. Main Street (State Road 356) next to the fire station in Lexington; 38°39′9″N 85°37′29″W | Politics |
| Pigeon Roost | | 2004 | Entrance to Pigeon Roost State Historic Site along U.S. Route 31, 5 miles south of Scottsburg; 38°36′56″N 85°46′33″W | American Indian/Native American |

== See also ==
- List of Indiana state historical markers
- National Register of Historic Places listings in Scott County, Indiana
