= National Register of Historic Places listings in Scott County, Indiana =

Location of Scott County in Indiana

This is a list of the National Register of Historic Places listings in Scott County, Indiana.

This is intended to be a complete list of the properties and districts on the National Register of Historic Places in Scott County, Indiana, United States. Latitude and longitude coordinates are provided for many National Register properties and districts; these locations may be seen together in a map.

There are three properties and districts listed on the National Register in the county.

Properties and districts located in incorporated areas display the name of the municipality, while properties and districts in unincorporated areas display the name of their civil township. Properties and districts split between multiple jurisdictions display the names of all jurisdictions.

This National Park Service list is complete through NPS recent listings posted December 19, 2025.

== Current listings ==
	Name on the Register	Image	Date listed	Location	City or town	Description
1	Scott County Home	Scott County Home	May 26, 2000 (#00000530)	1050 S. Main St. 38°40′28″N 85°46′10″W	Scottsburg	
2	Scottsburg Courthouse Square Historic District	Scottsburg Courthouse Square Historic District	June 22, 2003 (#03000547)	Roughly bounded by 1st, Kerton, Railroad, and Wardell Sts. 38°41′07″N 85°46′12″W	Scottsburg	
3	Scottsburg Depot	Scottsburg Depot	August 29, 1991 (#91001162)	43 S. Railroad St. 38°41′07″N 85°46′17″W	Scottsburg	

== See also ==
- List of National Historic Landmarks in Indiana
- National Register of Historic Places listings in Indiana
- Listings in neighboring counties: Clark, Jackson, Jefferson, Jennings, Washington
- List of Indiana state historical markers in Scott County
