= Paul Weatherwax =

American film editor (1900–1960)

Paul John Weatherwax (July 8, 1900 – September 13, 1960) was an American film editor, and two-time winner of the Academy Award for Best Film Editing.

== Biography ==
Weatherwax was born in Sturgis, Michigan, began his editing career in silent films in 1928, and over his career edited about 85 films. His final credit, 1961's A Raisin in the Sun, was selected for preservation in the United States of America National Film Registry by the Library of Congress as being "culturally, historically, or aesthetically significant" in 2005.

He also assisted, although uncredited, on the direction of Star Spangled Rhythm in 1942 and Vendetta in 1950.

== Partial filmography ==
Weatherwax's films include:

Editor
Year	Film	Director	Notes	Other notes
1928	Flying Romeos	Mervyn LeRoy	First collaboration with Mervyn LeRoy	
1928	Happiness Ahead	William A. Seiter		
1928	Vamping Venus	Edward F. Cline	First collaboration with Edward F. Cline	
1928	Oh, Kay!	Mervyn LeRoy	Second collaboration with Mervyn LeRoy	
1928	The Wedding March	Erich von Stroheim		Uncredited
1929	Not Quite Decent	Irving Cummings		
1929	Strange Cargo	Arthur Gregor		
1929	The Girl from Havana	Benjamin Stoloff		
1929	Romance of the Rio Grande	Alfred Santell	First collaboration with Alfred Santell	
1930	Men Without Women	John Ford	First collaboration with John Ford	Uncredited
1930	The Arizona Kid	Alfred Santell	Second collaboration with Alfred Santell	
1930	Rough Romance	A. F. Erickson		
1930	The Sea Wolf	Alfred Santell	Third collaboration with Alfred Santell	
1930	Men on Call	John G. Blystone		
1931	Body and Soul	Alfred Santell	Fourth collaboration with Alfred Santell	
1931	Surrender	William K. Howard	First collaboration with William K. Howard	Uncredited
1932	While Paris Sleeps	Allan Dwan		
1932	Mystery Ranch	David Howard		Uncredited
1932	Hat Check Girl	Sidney Lanfield	First collaboration with Sidney Lanfield	
1932	Born to Fight	Walter Mayo		
1933	Broadway Bad	Sidney Lanfield	Second collaboration with Sidney Lanfield	
1933	The Warrior's Husband	Walter Lang		Uncredited
1933	The Power and the Glory	William K. Howard	Second collaboration with William K. Howard	
1934	Long Lost Father	Ernest B. Schoedsack		
1934	The Lost Patrol	John Ford	Second collaboration with John Ford	
1934	George White's Scandals	George White		
1934	The World Moves On	John Ford	Third collaboration with John Ford	Uncredited
1934	Judge Priest	John Ford	Fourth collaboration with John Ford	Uncredited
1934	Elinor Norton	Hamilton MacFadden		
1935	The Dictator	Victor Saville		
1935	It's a Great Life	Edward F. Cline	Second collaboration with Edward F. Cline	
1935	The Bride Comes Home	Wesley Ruggles	First collaboration with Wesley Ruggles	
1936	F-Man	Edward F. Cline	Third collaboration with Edward F. Cline	
1936	The Princess Comes Across	William K. Howard	Third collaboration with William K. Howard	
1936	My American Wife	Harold Young		
1937	Champagne Waltz	A. Edward Sutherland		
1937	Waikiki Wedding	Frank Tuttle		
1937	Exclusive	Alexander Hall		
1937	True Confession	Wesley Ruggles	Second collaboration with Wesley Ruggles	
1938	You and Me	Fritz Lang	First collaboration with Fritz Lang	
1938	The Arkansas Traveler	Alfred Santell	Fifth collaboration with Alfred Santell	
1939	Café Society	Edward H. Griffith		
1939	The Gracie Allen Murder Case	Alfred E. Green		
1939	Rulers of the Sea	Frank Lloyd	First collaboration with Frank Lloyd	
1940	Road to Singapore	Victor Schertzinger	First collaboration with Victor Schertzinger	
1940	The Howards of Virginia	Frank Lloyd	Second collaboration with Frank Lloyd	
1940	Remedy for Riches	Erle C. Kenton		
1941	The Reluctant Dragon	Alfred L. Werker		
1941	Kiss the Boys Goodbye	Victor Schertzinger	Second collaboration with Victor Schertzinger	
1941	Birth of the Blues	Victor Schertzinger	Third collaboration with Victor Schertzinger	
1942	The Fleet's In	Victor Schertzinger	Fourth collaboration with Victor Schertzinger	
1942	The Forest Rangers	George Marshall	First collaboration with George Marshall	
1942	Star Spangled Rhythm	George Marshall	Second collaboration with George Marshall	
1943	Let's Face It	Sidney Lanfield	Third collaboration with Sidney Lanfield	
1944	Our Hearts Were Young and Gay	Lewis Allen		
1947	Fun on a Weekend	Andrew L. Stone		
1948	The Naked City	Jules Dassin		
1948	The Saxon Charm	Claude Binyon		
1948	You Gotta Stay Happy	H. C. Potter		
1949	Mrs. Mike	Louis King		
1950	Vendetta	Mel Ferrer		
1950	At War with the Army	Hal Walker		
1951	The Prowler	Joseph Losey		
1951	Behave Yourself!	George Beck		
1952	Road Agent	Lesley Selander	First collaboration with Lesley Selander	
1952	Desert Passage	Lesley Selander	Second collaboration with Lesley Selander	
1952	Beware, My Lovely	Harry Horner		
1952	Back at the Front	George Sherman	First collaboration with George Sherman	
1952	The Raiders	Lesley Selander	Third collaboration with Lesley Selander	
1953	Girls in the Night	Jack Arnold	First collaboration with Jack Arnold	
1953	The Lone Hand	George Sherman	Second collaboration with George Sherman	
1953	It Came from Outer Space	Jack Arnold	Second collaboration with Jack Arnold	
1953	The Veils of Bagdad	George Sherman	Third collaboration with George Sherman	
1954	The Rocket Man	Oscar Rudolph		
1955	Revenge of the Creature	Jack Arnold	Third collaboration with Jack Arnold	
1955	Ain't Misbehavin'	Edward Buzzell		
1955	Lady Godiva of Coventry	Arthur Lubin		
1955	The Spoilers	Jesse Hibbs		
1955	The Square Jungle	Jerry Hopper	First collaboration with Jerry Hopper	
1956	Never Say Goodbye	Jerry Hopper	Second collaboration with Jerry Hopper	
1956	Around the World in 80 Days	Michael Anderson		Uncredited
1957	Man on the Prowl	Art Napoleon		
1959	The Big Fisherman	Frank Borzage		
1961	A Raisin in the Sun	Daniel Petrie		

Editorial department
Year	Film	Director	Role	Notes	Other notes
1944	The Woman in the Window	Fritz Lang	Editorial supervisor	Second collaboration with Fritz Lang	Uncredited
1945	Along Came Jones	Stuart Heisler	Supervising editor		
1946	The Stranger	Orson Welles	Editorial supervisor		Uncredited
1954	Three Young Texans	Henry Levin	Supervising editor		
1954	Siege at Red River	Rudolph Maté	Editorial supervisor		
1954	Gorilla at Large	Harmon Jones	Editorial supervisor		
1956	Around the World in 80 Days	Michael Anderson	Supervising editor		Uncredited

Director
Year	Film	Notes	Other notes
1950	Vendetta	1946 substitute while Heisler was ill	Uncredited

Documentaries

Editor
Year	Film	Director
1953	Yesterday and Today	Abner J. Greshler

Editorial department
Year	Film	Director	Role
1953	Yesterday and Today	Abner J. Greshler	Supervising editor

Producer
Year	Film	Director	Credit
1953	Yesterday and Today	Abner J. Greshler	Associate producer

TV series

Editor
Year	Title	Notes
1958	How to Marry a Millionaire	1 episode
1958	Perry Mason	2 episodes
1958	Lassie	12 episodes
1959	Rawhide	1 episode
1957−60	Captain David Grief	6 episodes
1959−60	Hotel de Paree	5 episodes

== Awards ==
Awards
Year	Film	Role
1949	The Naked City	Academy Award for Best Film Editing
1957	Around the World in 80 Days	Academy Award for Best Film Editing
