= Marshfield, Scott County, Indiana =

Marshfield
- Unincorporated community
- Location within Indiana Location within the United States
- Coordinates: 38°42′33″N 85°46′54″W
- Country: United States
- State: Indiana
- County: Scott
- Township: Vienna
- Elevation: 535 ft (163 m)
- Time zone: UTC-5 (Eastern (EST))
  - Summer (DST): UTC-4 (EDT)
- ZIP code: 47170
- Area codes: 812, 930
- GNIS feature ID: 452180

Marshfield is an extinct town in Vienna Township, Scott County, in the U.S. state of Indiana, about three miles northwest of Scottsburg. The GNIS classifies it as a populated place.

== History ==
Marshfield functioned as a water stop on the Jeffersonville, Madison and Indianapolis Railroad. It was the site of the third train robbery in American history in 1868 by the Reno Gang of adjacent Jackson County. An Indiana historical marker marks the location of the robbery.
