= Michael Kahn (film editor) =

American film editor (born 1930)

- Born: December 8, 1930 (age 95); New York City, New York, U.S.
- Occupation: Film editor
- Years active: 1964–present

Michael Kahn (born December 8, 1930) is an American film editor, known for his frequent collaboration with Steven Spielberg. He has edited all but two of Spielberg's films since 1977's Close Encounters of the Third Kind. Among other accolades, he has won three Academy Awards for Best Film Editing, two BAFTA Awards, and a Primetime Emmy Award.

== Early life ==
Kahn was born to a Jewish family in New York City. While his birth year has been reported as 1935, Kahn said in 2015, when asked if he was 80, that his age at that point was "closer to 85." Prior to his film editing career, he was a producer for a New York ad agency.

== Career ==
=== Early work ===
Kahn worked in the post-production department of Desilu during the 1960s, where he was apprentice to editor Dann Cahn. Kahn's first notable work was as the head editor for the popular sitcom Hogan's Heroes (1965-71), editing 131 of the 168 episodes, over six seasons. Early in his career, he edited George C. Scott's only two films as director - Rage (1972) and The Savage Is Loose (1974).

He also edited Hogan's Heroes star Ivan Dixon's directorial efforts Trouble Man (1972) and The Spook Who Sat by the Door (1976), several B movies directed by Robert Clouse, and the cult horror film The Devil's Rain.

=== With Steven Spielberg ===
His first collaboration with Steven Spielberg was for his 1977 film, Close Encounters of the Third Kind. He has edited all of Spielberg's subsequent films as of 2015 except for E.T. the Extra-Terrestrial (1982), which was edited by Carol Littleton and Disclosure Day (2026), which was edited by Sarah Broshar. Kahn has received eight Academy Award nominations for Best Film Editing, and has won three times—for Raiders of the Lost Ark (1981), Schindler's List (1993), and Saving Private Ryan (1998), which were all Spielberg-directed films.

Kahn has edited digitally since at least Twister (1996), though he continued to edit on film with Spielberg long after most editors had stopped doing so. In 2008, Kahn acknowledged that "people find it hard to believe that Steven and I still edit film on a Moviola and a KEM. [But] Steven feels film got us where we are today and he loves the smell of it and feel of it. We started that way and both really enjoy it." George Lucas remarked "Michael Kahn can cut faster on a Moviola than anybody can cut on an Avid." However, since The Adventures of Tintin (2011), Kahn has edited Spielberg's films on an Avid machine.

Since 2017, Kahn has co-edited his films with Sarah Broshar.

== Filmography ==
=== Film ===
Year	Title	Director	Notes
1969	The Activist	Art Napoleon	
1971	Touch Me	Anthony Spinelli	
1972	Wild in the Sky	William T. Naud	
1972	Trouble Man	Ivan Dixon	1st of 2 collaborations with Dixon
1972	Rage	George C. Scott	
1973	The Spook Who Sat by the Door	Ivan Dixon	
1974	Black Belt Jones	Robert Clouse	1st of 3 collaborations with Clouse
1974	Truck Turner	Jonathan Kaplan	
1974	Golden Needles	Robert Clouse	
1974	Buster and Billie	Daniel Petrie	
1974	The Savage Is Loose	George C. Scott	
1975	The Devil's Rain	Robert Fuest	
1975	The Ultimate Warrior	Robert Clouse	
1976	The Return of a Man Called Horse	Irvin Kershner	1st of 2 collaborations with Kershner
1976	Hot Potato	Oscar Williams	Supervising editor
1977	Close Encounters of the Third Kind	Steven Spielberg	1st of 33 collaborations with Spielberg
1978	Eyes of Laura Mars	Irvin Kershner	
1978	Ice Castles	Donald Wrye	
1979	1941	Steven Spielberg	
1980	Used Cars	Robert Zemeckis	
1981	Raiders of the Lost Ark	Steven Spielberg	
1982	Poltergeist	Tobe Hooper	
1983	Table for Five	Robert Lieberman	
1983	Twilight Zone: The Movie	Steven Spielberg	Segment: "Kick the Can"
1984	Indiana Jones and the Temple of Doom	Steven Spielberg	
1984	Falling in Love	Ulu Grosbard	
1985	The Goonies	Richard Donner	
1985	The Color Purple	Steven Spielberg	
1986	Wisdom	Emilio Estevez	
1987	Fatal Attraction	Adrian Lyne	
1987	Empire of the Sun	Steven Spielberg	
1988	Arthur 2: On the Rocks	Bud Yorkin	
1989	Indiana Jones and the Last Crusade	Steven Spielberg	
1989	Always	Steven Spielberg	
1990	Arachnophobia	Frank Marshall	1st of 2 collaborations with Marshall
1991	Toy Soldiers	Daniel Petrie Jr.	
1991	Hook	Steven Spielberg	
1993	Alive	Frank Marshall	
1993	Jurassic Park	Steven Spielberg	
1993	Schindler's List	Steven Spielberg	
1995	Casper	Brad Silberling	
1996	Twister	Jan de Bont	
1997	The Lost World: Jurassic Park	Steven Spielberg	
1997	Amistad	Steven Spielberg	
1998	Saving Private Ryan	Steven Spielberg	
1999	The Haunting	Jan de Bont	
2000	Reindeer Games	John Frankenheimer	
2001	A.I. Artificial Intelligence	Steven Spielberg	
2002	Minority Report	Steven Spielberg	
2002	Catch Me If You Can	Steven Spielberg	
2003	Lara Croft: Tomb Raider – The Cradle of Life	Jan de Bont	
2003	Peter Pan	P. J. Hogan	
2004	Lemony Snicket's A Series of Unfortunate Events	Brad Silberling	
2004	The Terminal	Steven Spielberg	
2005	War of the Worlds	Steven Spielberg	
2005	Munich	Steven Spielberg	
2006	10 Items or Less	Brad Silberling	
2008	The Spiderwick Chronicles	Mark Waters	
2008	Indiana Jones and the Kingdom of the Crystal Skull	Steven Spielberg	
2010	Prince of Persia: The Sands of Time	Mike Newell	with Mick Audsley and Martin Walsh
2011	The Adventures of Tintin	Steven Spielberg	
2011	War Horse	Steven Spielberg	
2011	Pirates of the Caribbean: On Stranger Tides	Rob Marshall	Additional editor
2012	Lincoln	Steven Spielberg	
2014	Seventh Son	Sergei Bodrov	
2015	Bridge of Spies	Steven Spielberg	
2016	The BFG	Steven Spielberg	
2017	The Post	Steven Spielberg	with Sarah Broshar
2018	Ready Player One	Steven Spielberg	with Sarah Broshar
2021	West Side Story	Steven Spielberg	with Sarah Broshar
2022	The Fabelmans	Steven Spielberg	with Sarah Broshar

=== Television ===
Year	Title	Director	Notes
1965-71	Hogan's Heroes	Various	131 episodes
1970	Night Slaves	Ted Post	TV movie
1971	The Doris Day Show	Norman Tokar; Jerry London	Episodes: "And Here's... Doris", "When in Rome, Don't"
1971	The Chicago Teddy Bears	Leslie H. Martinson	Episode: "The Alderman"
1976	Eleanor and Franklin	Daniel Petrie	Miniseries; 2 episodes
2013	The Bridge	Gwyneth Horder-Payton	Episode: "The Crazy Place"

== Awards and nominations ==
Kahn equaled the record for the most Oscar wins (three) in the Best Film Editing category, shared with Ralph Dawson, Daniel Mandell, and Thelma Schoonmaker. Furthermore, he had eight nominations in that category—a number surpassed only by Schoonmaker. All of Kahn's Oscars came from his work on Spielberg's films, which included Raiders of the Lost Ark (1981), Schindler's List (1993), and Saving Private Ryan (1998). He has received six nominations for the BAFTA Award for Best Editing, winning for Fatal Attraction (1987) and Schindler's List.

Kahn has been selected for membership in the American Cinema Editors (ACE). In 2011, he received the Career Achievement Award of the American Cinema Editors. At the ceremony, Steven Spielberg said of editing: "this is where filmmaking goes from a craft to an art." In November 2013, Spielberg created the Michael Kahn Endowed Chair in Editing at the University of Southern California's School of Cinematic Arts in honor of Kahn. The first to be appointed to the position was Norman Hollyn.

Year	Association	Category	Project	Result	Ref.
1977	Academy Awards	Best Film Editing	Close Encounters of the Third Kind	Nominated	
1977	BAFTA Awards	Best Editing	Close Encounters of the Third Kind	Nominated	
1981	Academy Awards	Best Film Editing	Raiders of the Lost Ark	Won	
1981	ACE Eddie	Best Edited Feature Film – Dramatic	Raiders of the Lost Ark	Won	
1981	BAFTA Awards	Best Editing	Raiders of the Lost Ark	Nominated	
1984	BAFTA Awards	Best Editing	Indiana Jones and the Temple of Doom	Nominated	
1987	Academy Awards	Best Film Editing	Fatal Attraction	Nominated	
1987	ACE Eddie	Best Edited Feature Film – Dramatic	Fatal Attraction	Nominated	
1987	BAFTA Awards	Best Editing	Fatal Attraction	Won	
1987	Academy Awards	Best Film Editing	Empire of the Sun	Nominated	
1993	Academy Awards	Best Film Editing	Schindler's List	Won	
1993	ACE Eddie	Best Edited Feature Film – Dramatic	Schindler's List	Won	
1993	BAFTA Awards	Best Editing	Schindler's List	Won	
1997	Satellite Award	Best Editing	Amistad	Nominated	
1998	Academy Awards	Best Film Editing	Saving Private Ryan	Won	
1998	ACE Eddie	Best Edited Feature Film – Dramatic	Saving Private Ryan	Won	
1998	BAFTA Awards	Best Editing	Saving Private Ryan	Nominated	
1998	Satellite Award	Best Editing	Saving Private Ryan	Won	
2005	Academy Awards	Best Film Editing	Munich	Nominated	
2005	ACE Eddie	Best Edited Feature Film – Dramatic	Munich	Nominated	
2005	Satellite Awards	Best Editing	War of the Worlds	Nominated	
2011	Annie Award	Best Editing in a Feature Production	The Adventures of Tintin	Nominated	
2011	Saturn Award	Best Editing	The Adventures of Tintin	Nominated	
2011	ACE Eddie	Best Edited Feature Film – Dramatic	War Horse	Nominated	
2011	Critics' Choice Movie Award	Best Editing	War Horse	Nominated	
2011	Satellite Award	Best Editing	War Horse	Nominated	
2012	Academy Awards	Best Film Editing	Lincoln	Nominated	
2012	Critics' Choice Movie Award	Best Editing	Lincoln	Nominated	
2015	BAFTA Awards	Best Editing	Bridge of Spies	Nominated	
2015	Satellite Award	Best Editing	Bridge of Spies	Nominated	
2016	Saturn Award	Best Editing	The BFG	Won	
2017	ACE Eddie Award	Best Edited Feature Film – Dramatic	The Post	Nominated	
2017	Critics' Choice Movie Award	Best Editing	The Post	Nominated	
2017	San Diego Film Critics Society	Best Editing	The Post	Nominated	
2017	San Francisco Film Critics Circle	Best Editing	The Post	Nominated	
2017	St. Louis Film Critics Association	Best Editing	The Post	Nominated	
2021	Critics' Choice Movie Award	best Editing	West Side Story	Won	
