= Geoffrey Freshwater =

English actor

Geoffrey Freshwater is an English actor. His television appearances include The Government Inspector and the recurring character of Sgt Eric Rivers in 5 episodes of Foyle's War. He was also a member of the Royal Shakespeare Company, appearing in their 2007-08 This England cycle of Shakespeare's history plays.

As a young actor, Geoffrey Freshwater was engaged in 1972 for a repertory season by Newpalm Productions at the Civic Theatre, Chelmsford, appearing in productions such as Oh, What a Lovely War!. In 1982 he appeared in Alan Plater's stage play On Your Way, Riley! with Brian Murphy and Maureen Lipman.
