= Hugh Futcher =

English actor (born 1937)

- Born: 29 October 1937 (age 88); Portsmouth, Hampshire, England
- Occupation: Actor
- Years active: 1958–present

Hugh Futcher (born 29 October 1937) is an English actor in theatre, television and film. He was a member of the stock company of the Carry On films, with notable parts in Carry On Spying, Carry On at Your Convenience, and Carry On Behind. Other films include Roman Polanski's Repulsion (as Colin's pubmate Reggie) and the Herman's Hermits musical Mrs. Brown, You've Got a Lovely Daughter.

In television, Futcher had a recurring role in the adventure series Orlando as "Hedgehog." He has also appeared on The Saint, Z-Cars, The Sweeney, Minder, and Casualty. In 1972, he appeared in the Doctor Who serial The Sea Devils, and Six Days of Justice, in the episode "A Private Nuisance", with Earl Cameron and Mollie Sugden. Fifteen years later he was considered for the role of the Seventh Doctor, but accepted other work that precluded taking the part.

He appeared with Brian Murphy and Maureen Lipman in the 1985 television drama On Your Way, Riley.

In 2011, he appeared in episode 5 of series 5 of MI High as George.

== Filmography ==
=== Film ===
Year	Title	Role	Notes
1963	Farewell Performance	Max	
1964	Carry On Spying	Bed-of-Nails Native	
1964	Rattle of a Simple Man	Ozzie	
1964	Crooks in Cloisters	Crook (uncredited)	
1965	Repulsion	Reggie	
1965	The Pleasure Girls	Pablo	
1966	The Sandwich Man	Gogi	
1967	Don't Lose Your Head	Guard	Uncredited
1967	The Magnificent Two	Soldier	Uncredited
1967	A Countess from Hong Kong	Barker	Uncredited
1967	Quatermass and the Pit	Sapper West	
1968	Mrs. Brown, You've Got a Lovely Daughter	Swothard	
1968	Diamonds for Breakfast	Museum visitor with bananas	Uncredited
1969	Before Winter Comes	Joe	
1969	Battle of Britain	RAF Ground Crew	Uncredited
1969	Carry On Again Doctor	Taxi Driver	Uncredited
1969	Anne of the Thousand Days	Crowd Heckler	Uncredited
1971	Journey to Murder	Wardrobe Dresser	(Do Me a Favor and Kill Me)
1971	Carry On at Your Convenience	Ernie	
1972	Bless This House	Car Owner	Uncredited
1972	Carry On Abroad	Jailer	
1973	Carry On Girls	Second Citizen	Uncredited
1975	Carry On Behind	Painter	
1987	Johann Strauss: The King Without a Crown	Steidl	
2000	102 Dalmatians	Brakeman	
2022	A Midsummer Night's Dream	Quince	
2023	Tuesday	Hans	
2025	Jingle Bell Heist	Old Man	

=== Television ===
Year	Title	Role	Notes
1960	Death of a Ghost	Mr. Green	2 episodes
1960	Armchair Theatre	Tony Fury	Episode: "The Leather Jungle"
1961	The Arthur Askey Show	Postman	2 episodes
1961	Tales of Mystery	Alf	Episode: "Accessory Before the Fact"
1961	Armchair Theatre	Duddy Kravitz	Episode: "The Apprenticeship of Duddy Kravitz"
1961	Emergency Ward 10	Ron Clark	Episode: "482"
1961	Probation Officer	Mr. Plummer	Episode: #3.3
1963	The Plane Makers	Brian Tickle	Episode: "The Short Run"
1963	Moonstrike	Jean	Episode: "The Factory"
1963	Sergeant Cork	Soloman	Episode: "The Case of the Gold Salesman"
1965	Dixon of Dock Green	Charlie Bell	Episode: "The Intruders"
1967	Z-Cars	Jimmy	2 episodes
1970	Special Branch	Cotterill	Episode: "Love from Doris"
1970	The Doctors	Dr. Taylor	2 episodes
1972	Doctor Who	Hickman	Episode: "The Sea Devils"
1972	Six Days of Justice	Leonard Witcher	Episode: "A Private Nuisance"
1972	Jason King	Jean	Episode: "That Isn't Me, It's Somebody Else"
1972	Queenie's Castle	Milkman	Episode: "The One That Got Away"
1975	The Sweeney	The Porter	Episode: "Stoppo Driver"
1984	Minder	Mo	Episode: "Sorry Pal, Wrong Number"
1993	The Bill	Mr. Steiner	Episode: "Credible Witness"
2011	M.I.High	George	Episode: "The Gran Master"
2017	The Crown	David Ben-Gurion	Episode: "Misadventure"
2021	Ted Lasso	Nigel	2 episodes
