= The Activist =

The Activist may refer to:

- The Activist (1969 film), an American drama film
- The Activist (2014 film), a French-American thriller film with Michael Spears
- The Activist, an online and print publication of the Young Democratic Socialists of America

== See also ==
- Activism
- The Activity
- Theodore Boone: The Activist
