= Man on the Prowl =

Man on the Prowl may refer to:

- "Man on the Prowl" (song), a song by Queen
- Man on the Prowl (film), a 1957 American crime film
