= Scottsburg Courthouse Square Historic District =

Historic district in Indiana, United States

- U.S. National Register of Historic Places
- U.S. Historic district
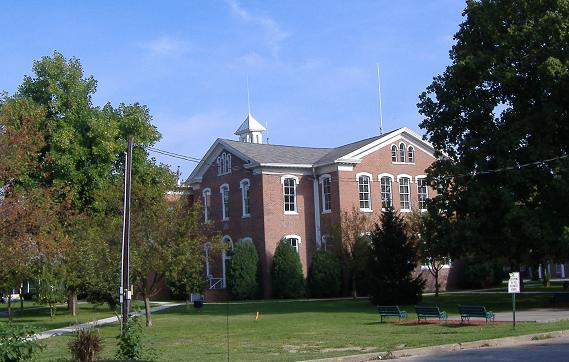
- Scottsburg Courthouse

- Location within Indiana Location within the United States
- Location: Roughly bounded by 1st, Kerton, Railroad, and Wardell Sts., Scottsburg, Indiana
- Coordinates: 38°41′07″N 85°46′12″W
- Area: 16.5 acres (6.7 ha)
- Architect: Baty, Andrew; et.al.
- Architectural style: Late Victorian, Late 19th And Early 20th Century American Movements
- NRHP reference No.: 03000547
- Added to NRHP: June 22, 2003

The Scottsburg Courthouse Square Historic District is a national historic district located at Scottsburg, Indiana. The district encompasses 48 contributing buildings and eight contributing objects in the central business district of Scottsburg centered on the Scott County Courthouse. It developed between about 1873 and 1952, and includes notable examples of Italianate, Romanesque Revival, Gothic Revival, and Stick Style / Eastlake movement style architecture. The courthouse was built in 1873–1874 after the decision was made to finally locate the county seat of Scott County into a central location within the county, which caused the founding of Scottsburg. Located in the district is the separately listed Scottsburg Depot. Other notable contributing resources include the Town Tavern (1924), A&P Grocery (1923), Corner Drugstore (c. 1880), Harmon Building (1907), City Hall (1899–1900), Napper's Hospital (1936), Scott Theatre (1946), Scott County Public (Carnegie) Library (1919), Scott County Bank (1906), Prosser's Hardware (1912), and a statue of William Hayden English (1908).

It was listed on the National Register of Historic Places in 2003.
