= Rage at Dawn =

1955 American western film

- Theatrical release poster
- Directed by: Tim Whelan
- Screenplay by: Horace McCoy
- Story by: Frank Gruber
- Produced by: Nat Holt
- Starring: Randolph Scott; Forrest Tucker; Mala Powers; J. Carrol Naish
- Cinematography: Ray Rennahan
- Edited by: Harry Marker
- Music by: Paul Sawtell
- Production company: Nat Holt Productions
- Distributed by: RKO Radio Pictures
- Release dates: March 26, 1955 (Los Angeles); June 2, 1955 (United States)
- Running time: 87 minutes
- Country: United States
- Language: English

Rage at Dawn is a 1955 American Technicolor Western film directed by Tim Whelan, and starring Randolph Scott, Forrest Tucker, Mala Powers, and J. Carrol Naish. It purports to tell the true story of the Reno Brothers, an outlaw gang which terrorized the American Midwest, particularly Southern Indiana, in the period immediately following the American Civil War.

A more successful version of the Reno brothers' story was released the following year as Love Me Tender, starring Elvis Presley as Clint Reno.

== Plot ==
Four of the Reno Brothers are corrupt robbers and killers while a fifth, Clint, is a respected Indiana farmer. A sister, Laura, who has inherited the family home, serves as a housekeeper and cook to the brothers. Some of them served in the Civil War, which has given them a hardened attitude toward violence. One brother is killed when they go after a bank in a nearby town, leading them to draw the conclusion that someone that they know is an informant, as the men of the town appeared to have been waiting for them. They soon learn that it was Murphy, a local bartender, whom they then murder by knocking him out, and tying him up in his barn, which they then set ablaze. The bartender was an agent employed by the Peterson Detective Agency sent to investigate and provide information about the Reno Brothers' crimes.

His replacement is James Barlow, a former secret agent for the Confederacy, who determines to join the gang by posing as a train robber, a ploy which is aided by his being allowed to pull off a staged train robbery (with the full cooperation of the train crew) in the area. He also begins courting Laura. Grudgingly accepted by the brothers, led by Frank Reno, he soon learns that they have corrupted local officials, including a judge, allowing them to operate in that part of the state with impunity. The brothers plan a train robbery with Barlow, but this proves to be a setup in which they are captured following a shootout and taken to an area jail outside the jurisdiction of the corrupted officials. Townspeople break into the jail and lynch the brothers before they can be brought to trial despite Barlow's attempt to intervene. Laura arrives immediately afterward and accepts his efforts as genuine.

== Cast ==
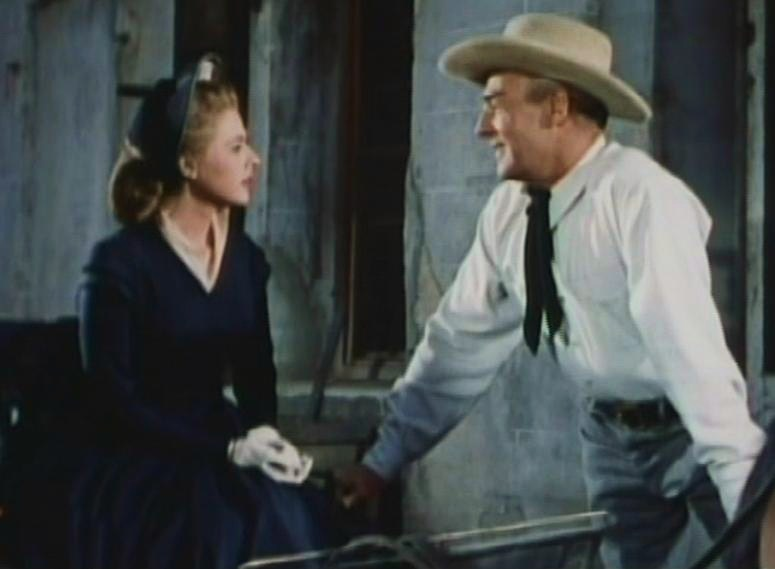
Mala Powers (left) and Randolph Scott (right) in Rage at Dawn

- Randolph Scott as James Barlow
- Forrest Tucker as Frank Reno
- Mala Powers as Laura Reno
- J. Carrol Naish as Simeon 'Sim' Reno
- Edgar Buchanan as Judge
- Myron Healey as John Reno
- Howard Petrie as Lattimore – Prosecuting Attorney
- Ray Teal as Sheriff of Seymour
- William Forrest as William Peterson
- Denver Pyle as Clint Reno
- Trevor Bardette as Fisher
- Kenneth Tobey as Monk Claxton

== Production ==
This film was shot on location in Columbia State Historic Park, California, which means that the buildings have a somewhat authentic period look and the topography somewhat resembles many parts of southern Indiana near Seymour, which are very hilly. Somewhat lessening the verisimilitude, as the gang makes its way into the town to rob the bank, there is the unmistakable sight of electric lines and utility poles, and — as the robbers ride through — more power lines, and a pole flying the California State Flag, are shown in passing. The railroad scenes were filmed on the Sierra Railroad in Tuolumne County, California.

== See also ==
- List of films in the public domain in the United States
