= Hangman Crossing, Indiana =

Hangman Crossing
- Unincorporated community
- Interactive map of Hangman Crossing
- Coordinates: 38.940228°N 85.926647°W
- Country: United States
- State: Indiana
- County: Jackson
- Township: Jackson
- Elevation: 568 ft (173 m)
- Time zone: UTC-5 (EST)
  - Summer (DST): UTC-4 (EDT)
- ZIP Code: 47274
- Area code: 812
- FIPS code: 18-31162
- GNIS feature ID: 435680

Hangman Crossing is an unincorporated community in Jackson Township, Jackson County, Indiana, United States. It was originally west Seymour, but is now within or adjoining the city's limits. It is located where Second Street Road turns south, crosses the Baltimore and Ohio Railroad tracks, and meets U.S. Route 50.

== History ==
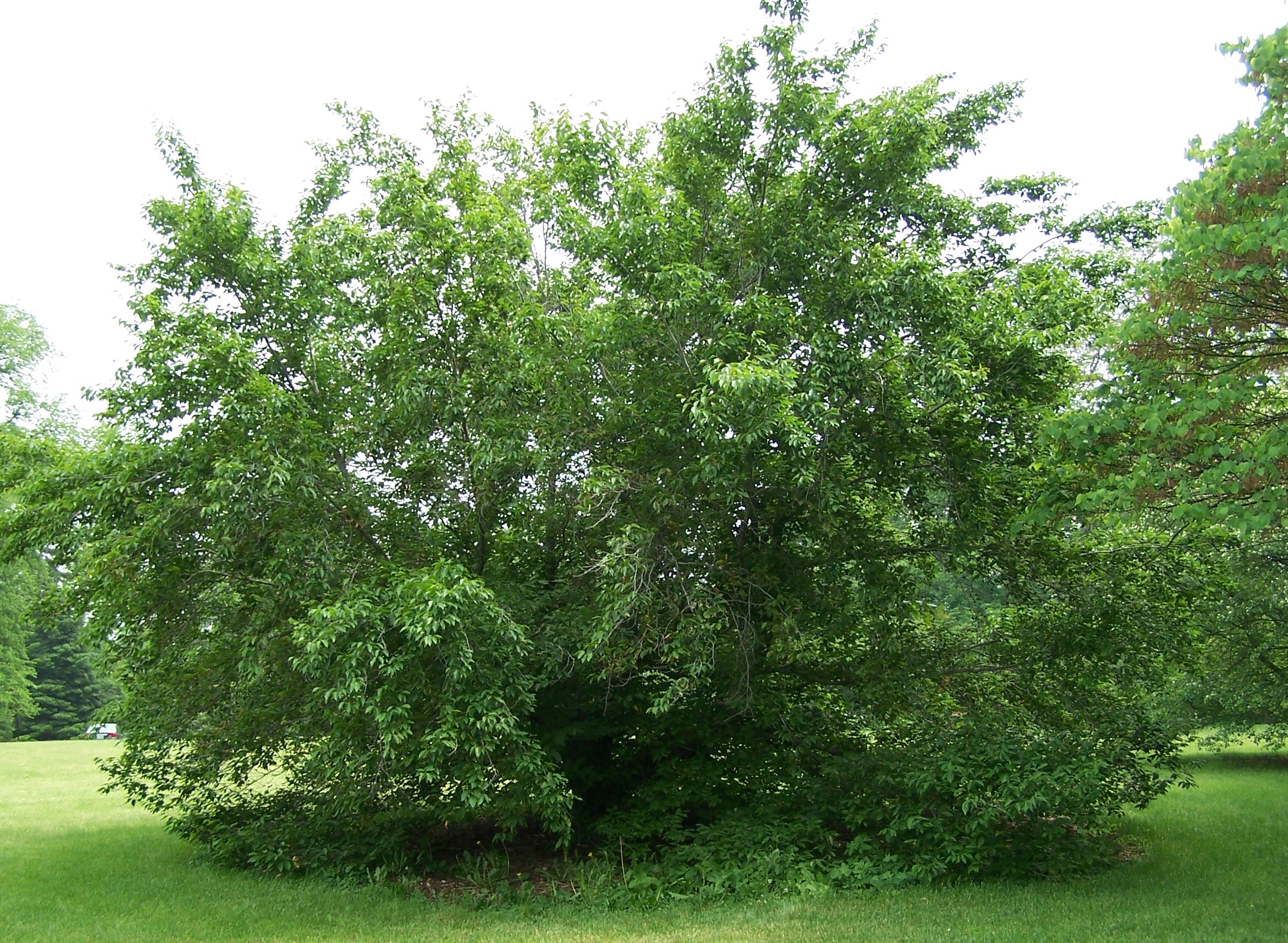
An American beech (Fagus grandifolia), the species of tree from which the Reno Gang members were hanged. The original tree is no longer standing.

The crossing takes its name from the lynching of six members from the Reno Gang. On July 20, 1868, three captured gang members—Roseberry, Clifton, and Elliott—were being taken by train to Brownstown for arraignment when a band of masked vigilantes stopped the train at the crossing, seized the prisoners, and hanged them from a large beech tree. Five nights later, a second group of three—Moore, Sparks, and Jerrell—were captured in Mattoon, Illinois. They taken from a wagon on the same road and hanged on the same tree.

Beech trees do not typically have branches strong enough to support a hanging, but this particular tree was large enough for the purpose. In the years that followed, souvenir hunters cut the ropes into pieces and stripped leaves and twigs, while the trunk was covered with carved initials. It is reputed that in 1875 Nellie Jonas, a sister of the lynched John Moore, had the tree girdled and then burned. A Seymour newspaper reported in 1882 that the tree had not put out leaves for years.

=== Location of the hanging tree ===
The hangings took place not at the crossing itself but some distance down the "Old Brownstown Road," which ran south from the crossing rather than following the line of the present U.S. Route 50. One early source described the first three victims as being walked "down a country road about 200 yards" from the railroad. In describing the second hanging, the same source noted that about 100 yards farther down the lane was a small bridge followed by a sharp turn in the road. Both of these features still existed when the site was studied in the late 20th century, making them useful landmarks in finding the location. Another early account placed the tree beside a worm-rail fence with just enough room for a wagon to pass between them. A contemporary newspaper from 1881 recorded that the bridge on the wagon road at Hangman's Crossing had been carried away by high water.

A later account attributed to Shields located the tree about a quarter-mile south of the crossing, on the farm of a German man named Borcherding. It stood on the near side of a tiny stream that ran under the Old Brownstown Road, and was near Borcherding's front door. A more recent description, by Boley, held that the tree had stood at a spot "now in the middle of U.S. 50," but this does not fit the earlier accounts and appears to overlook that the old road diverged south from the modern highway. On balance, the folklore study concluded that most evidence points to a location just south of the crossing, on the west side of the road, some distance from the crossing itself. By the time of that study, the tree was gone and its exact position had become "shrouded in mystery."

== Sources ==
- Schrink, Jeffrey; Schrink, Frances (1980). "Hangman's Crossing". In Dégh, Linda (ed.). Indiana Folklore: A Reader. Bloomington: Indiana University Press. pp. 93–100. ISBN 978-0253202390.
