= Flight of the Lost Balloon =

1961 film by Nathan H. Juran

- Original film poster
- Directed by: Nathan Juran
- Written by: Nathan Juran
- Produced by: Bernard Woolner; Jacques R. Marquette
- Starring: Mala Powers; Marshall Thompson
- Cinematography: Jacques Marquette
- Music by: Hal Borne
- Production company: W.M.J. Productions
- Distributed by: Woolner Brothers; American International Pictures
- Release date: December 28, 1961
- Running time: 91 min.
- Country: United States
- Language: English
- Budget: $75,000

Flight of the Lost Balloon is a 1961 film produced, written and directed by Nathan Juran and starring Mala Powers and Marshall Thompson.

The film was inspired by Jules Verne's 1863 novel Five Weeks in a Balloon and beat the major Irwin Allen film release of the book to the cinemas. (Note: Jules Verne's name was dropped from the title and was nowhere to be found in the credits, although the name of Verne's balloon, the Victoria, remained.)

== Plot ==
In 1878, British explorer, Sir Hubert Warrington (Douglas Kennedy) is held prisoner in an old fortress on the Nile. A despotic Hindu (James Lanphier) keeps him captive, as Sir Hubert discovered the hidden tomb where Cleopatra's treasure is buried.

Sir Hubert refuses to disclose the exact location of the jewels, resisting the Hindu's many painful tortures. The Hindu goes to England and tricks the Royal Geographical Society in London into organizing a rescue mission. Included in the expedition is Sir Hubert's fiancée, Ellen Burton (Mala Powers), whom the Hindu plans to torture until Sir Hubert agrees to talk.

A young explorer, Dr. Joseph Faraday (Marshall Thompson), convinces the Royal Geographical Society that the trip should be made by balloon. With Ellen and the Hindu, the group set out for Egypt. After several adventures, including their temporary capture by cannibals and an attack by huge condors, the trio arrive at the Nile fortress where Sir Hubert is held captive. Prior to landing a tear in the balloon makes the party jettison all their ballast and belongings, with Faraday jumping into the water to lighten the load.

Upon the pair's arrival, the Hindu has Ellen tortured on a stretching rack, but Sir Hubert still refuses to divulge his secret. Faraday, who has swum ashore and has eluded the Hindu's native helpers and his captive gorillas, rescues them, but Sir Hubert dies trying to load the balloon with chests of treasure. Faraday and Ellen make their escape but in order to keep the balloon aloft, they are forced to jettison the gold and jewels. Ellen, however, in love with Faraday, saves one diamond for a wedding ring.

== Cast ==
- Mala Powers as Ellen Burton
- Marshall Thompson as Doctor Joseph Faraday
- James Lanphier as The Hindu
- Douglas Kennedy as Sir Hubert Warrington
- Robert W. Gillette as Sir Adam Burton
- Felipe Birriel as Golan
- Leo Ledbetter as The Witch Doctor (and two other roles)

== Production ==
Nathan Juran agreed to make the film with the working title of Cleopatra and the Cyclops. because he had a percentage of the profits. It was produced by the Woolner brothers who had directed the director on Attack of the 50 Foot Woman.

"I wanted to become independent of the major studios," said Juran. "I was always looking for a small entrepreneur with whom I could grow as a partner in the company. I thought it might have worked out with the Woolners, but they were just the wrong people for me. They were real schlock guys. I owned one quarter of Lost Balloon but they stole all the money."

In May 1960, the Woolners signed Marshall Thompson and James Lanphier to star in the film. Lanphier was taking part under a three picture contract with the Woolners, the other films of which were to be Adventures of Captain Kidd and Thunder Over San Juan.

Flight of the Lost Balloon was shot over 10 days from May to June 1961 in Puerto Rico. Shooting was extremely difficult as there were no studio facilities.

== Reception ==
As a promotional gimmick people who bought tickets for Flight of the Lost Balloon were given a "motion sickness pill". Film reviewer John L. Scott, writing for the Los Angeles Times said, "I could hardly wait to escape".

== See also ==
- List of American films of 1961

== Bibliography ==
- Taves, Brian, Stephen Michaluk and Edward Baxter. The Jules Verne Encyclopedia. Lanham, Maryland: Scarecrow Press, 1996. ISBN 978-0-8108-2961-9.
- Weaver, Tom. "Jacque Marquette Interview" in Double Feature Creature Attack: A Monster Merger of Two More Volumes of Classic Interviews. Jefferson, North Carolina: McFarland, 2003. ISBN 978-0-78641-366-9.
