= Vivi Janiss =

American actress

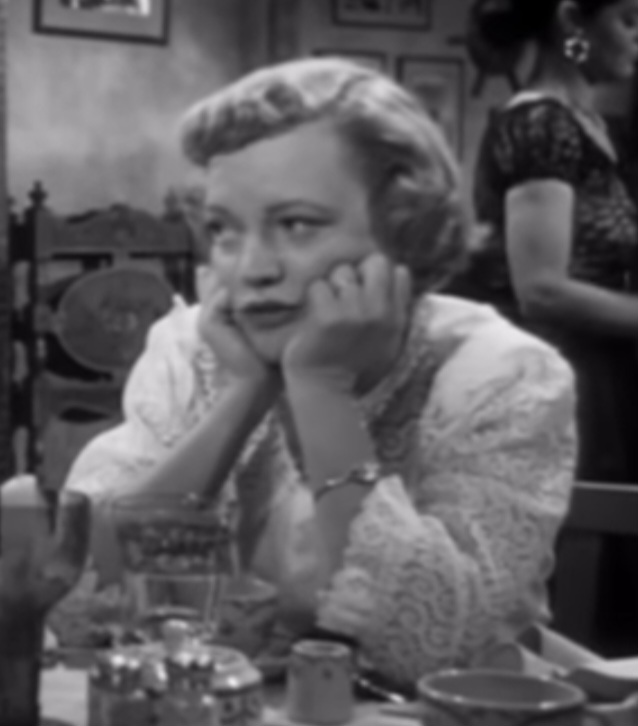
- Janiss in Kansas City Confidential (1952)
- Born: May 29, 1911; Omaha, Nebraska U.S.
- Died: September 7, 1988 (aged 77); Los Angeles, California U.S.
- Occupation: Actress
- Years active: 1949–1979
- Spouses: Bob Cummings (m. 1935; div. 1943); John Larch (m. 1955)

Vivi Janiss (born Vivian Audrey Jamison; May 29, 1911 – September 7, 1988) was an American actress, known for such films as The Phantom from 10,000 Leagues (1955), Man on the Prowl (1957), and First, You Cry (1978).

== Early years ==
Vivi Janiss's father was Earl Alexander Jamison, born August 3, 1889, in Nebraska, and died June 17, 1962, in California. He was married to Helen Matilda Jamison née Liljgren. (A published source gives his name as Earl Janis and hers as Helen Empton.) They were traveling theatricals in the Midwest and West in the 1920s and 1930s, eventually settling in California. Vivi was their only child. A native of Nebraska, she was the second wife of actor and comedian Bob Cummings, to whom she was wed from 1935 to 1943. The couple met while performing in 1934 in the Ziegfeld Follies on Broadway.

== Career ==
Janis was a protegee of Ben Bernie, and she sang with his orchestra at the College Inn in Chicago. The Chicago Tribune reported that she "rates high favor with the patrons" there. She went from that engagement to the Garrick Theater, replacing Blossom Seeley as the lead in Girl Crazy.

Janis had performed one week with Leon Balasco's Orchestra at the Palace Theatre when Mrs. Florenz Zigfeld signed her for the new Ziegfeld Follies in July 1933. She performed three songs in Ziegfeld Follies of 1934. In the 1934 Follies, Bob Cummings, performing under the stage name of Brice Hutchins, and Vivi (billed as Vivian Janis) on January 4, 1934 gave the first live performance of the Vernon Duke and E. Y. Harburg song “I Like The Likes of You.” She also performed on Broadway in Miracle in the Mountains (1947).

She was also the voice of Walt Disney's Daisy Duck and appeared on both the Gunsmoke radio and television series. Other radio credits included Escape, Suspense, Yours Truly, Johnny Dollar, and On Stage.

From 1952 to 1955, Janiss appeared in five episodes of Jack Webb's original TV version of the police series Dragnet (again also acting on the radio version). From 1953 to 1957, she was cast in four episodes of the Schlitz Playhouse of Stars anthology series. From 1954 to 1959, Janiss appeared as Myrtle Davis in 11 episodes of Robert Young's Father Knows Best situation comedy series, which aired on NBC and then CBS. From 1959 to 1962, she had supporting episodic roles in six episodes of the NBC Western series Wagon Train with Ward Bond and John McIntire. She appears in the Highway Patrol episode "Reckless Driving".

In 1955, she played the historical Mary Todd Lincoln in "How Chance Made Lincoln President" in the anthology series TV Reader's Digest. Richard Gaines was cast as Abraham Lincoln.

In 1957, Janiss joined Frank Ferguson as guest stars in the roles of Mabel and Frank Cliff in the episode "No Blaze of Glory" of Rod Cameron's syndicated series State Trooper, a story of a presumed arson case with a surprise ending set in Goldfield, Nevada. In 1959, Janiss was cast the role of Ella Westover in a second State Trooper episode, "Excitement at Milltown," along with Dayton Lummis and Suzanne Lloyd, a story about mysterious accidents at a remote lumber mill. On December 4, 1959, Janiss was cast in the CBS anthology series Westinghouse Desilu Playhouse, hosted by Desi Arnaz in the episode "The Hanging Judge" in which James Whitmore portrays a judge intent on bringing about vengeance of the killer of the judge's daughter. Others cast in the episode were John McIntire, as Janiss's husband, Jean Hagen, Buddy Ebsen, and Warren Berlinger.

In its first season on the air, Janiss was cast with Everett Sloane in Rod Serling's The Twilight Zone episode "The Fever", season 1, episode 17, which aired January 29, 1960. Then on October 7, 1960, cast as Edna Castle, she joined Luther Adler in the role of her husband, pawnbroker Arthur Castle, in "The Man in the Bottle" episode of The Twilight Zone. In the story line, a genie grants four wishes to the couple, which fail to allow them to escape their humble lifestyle, but allow them to appreciate it. Years later in 1977, Janiss played a minor role as a pawnshop proprietor in the episode "Second Chance" of James Garner's NBC detective series The Rockford Files.

Janiss appeared in many other series, too, three times on The F.B.I., starring Efrem Zimbalist Jr., and twice each on The Virginian and Ben Casey. She was cast once on Dick Powell's Zane Grey Theatre, Lawman, Trackdown, Cimarron City, Route 66, Have Gun – Will Travel, Follow the Sun, Gunsmoke, Outlaws, The Rockford Files, Laramie, 87th Precinct, Perry Mason, Mannix, and The Streets of San Francisco.

After she and Cummings divorced, Janiss wed actor John Larch, who was cast as the police chief in 1971 in the first of Clint Eastwood's Dirty Harry films. She was married to Larch until her death. The couple appeared together on four television series, including the series premiere, "No Fat Cops", on October 3, 1961, of ABC's The New Breed, starring Leslie Nielsen. In this episode, Larch and Janiss were cast as John and Mary Clark. Earlier, the two had co-starred on November 23, 1959, as Johnny and Elsie in the episode "End of an Era" of NBC's Western series, Tales of Wells Fargo, starring Dale Robertson, and on May 23, 1960, as Isaiah and Rebecca Macabee in the episode "The Proud Earth" of the half-hour NBC anthology series Goodyear Theatre. On November 9, 1960, Larch and Janiss appeared as Ben and Sarah Harness in the episode "The Cathy Eckhart Story" of Wagon Train, with Susan Oliver in the starring role. Later, on December 19, 1968, the couple appeared again together in the 10th episode "Yesterday Died and Tomorrow Won't Be Born" of Jack Lord's CBS crime drama Hawaii Five-O.

Janiss's last roles were in the 1978 CBS television film First, You Cry, a story about breast cancer starring Mary Tyler Moore, and in two 1979 CBS series appearances on Barnaby Jones with Buddy Ebsen (Janiss and Bob Cummings had appeared together with Ebsen 45 years earlier in the Ziegfeld Follies), and House Calls, starring Wayne Rogers.

== Filmography ==
Year	Title	Role	Notes
1952	Kansas City Confidential	Mrs. Rogers	Uncredited
1953	99 River Street	Edna - Taxi Dispatcher	Uncredited
1955	The Phantom from 10,000 Leagues	Ethel Hall, Dr. King's Secretary	
1956	Alfred Hitchcock Presents	Maude Martin	Season 1 Episode 16: "You Got to Have Luck"
1956	Alfred Hitchcock Presents	Sergeant Bradford	Season 1 Episode 36: "Mink"
1956	The Fastest Gun Alive	Mabel Brown	Uncredited
1957	Spring Reunion	Grace	
1957	Man on the Prowl	Mrs. Gerhardt	
1978	First, You Cry	Martha	TV movie
