= Felipe Birriel =

Puerto Rico's tallest man

Felipe Birriel "El Gigante de Carolina"
- Born: Felipe Birriel Fernández; August 16, 1916; Carolina, Puerto Rico
- Died: March 15, 1994 (aged 77); Carolina, Puerto Rico
- Known for: Puerto Rico's tallest man
- Height: 7 ft 11 in (241 cm)

Felipe Birriel Fernández, also known as "El Gigante de Carolina" (Carolina's Giant) (August 16, 1916 – March 15, 1994) is considered to have been the tallest Puerto Rican, with an unconfirmed height of 2.413 meters or nearly 7 feet 11 inches.

== Early years ==
Birriel was born in the Barrazas barrio of Carolina, Puerto Rico. He was the third of nine children born to Juan Pedro Birriel y Birriel (1878–1967), a farmer, and Dionisia Fernández Fernández (1890–1985). His highest level of education was up to the second grade in elementary school. As a child, Birriel was sent to the farm fields where he helped his parents plant vegetable seeds. He also worked picking fruits and coffee beans and as a waterboy, delivered water to the sugar cane workers.

In 1932, when Birriel was 16 years old, he started to grow at an alarming rate. One day, he felt sick with dizziness and weakness causing him to see a doctor. The doctor informed Birriel that his pituitary gland had developed a tumor. Even though the condition did not have a known cure, it was still treatable. The treatment required a radio therapy machine which could only be found in the United States. The machine was sent in 1932, but it was not until 1941—nine years later—that it finally arrived in Puerto Rico.

== Later years ==
Birriel lived with his brother and sister-in-law in the town of Carolina and became something of a folk hero and known as "El Gigante de Carolina" (The Giant of Carolina). He appeared in the film Flight of the Lost Balloon filmed in Puerto Rico in 1961. In 1974, during the celebration of the FIBA World Basketball Championships celebrated in San Juan, Puerto Rico, Birriel was the guest of honor and was invited to the basketball court, in front of all the spectators he dunked the ball without jumping, a standing ovation followed.

The Government of Puerto Rico and local businessmen helped him economically, since his daily personal needs could not be met with the money that he earned in personal appearances. The owners of local furniture stores also helped Birriel by making furniture especially for him. His health, however had worsened progressively and he died from a heart attack on March 15, 1994, at the age of 77, in Carolina, Puerto Rico. He was buried at Cementerio Municipal La Santa Cruz in Carolina, Puerto Rico.

Birriel was unique in reaching a relatively old age while being as tall as he was; most extremely tall people tend to experience serious disabling medical conditions such as the ones that eventually crippled, and then killed, Robert Wadlow (the tallest human during his lifetime) at an early age.

== Honors ==
The town of Carolina is also known as the "Land of Giants" in honor of Birriel. Carolina also unveiled a mural which states the following: "Carolina, Tierra de Gigantes" (Carolina, Land of Giants). The BSN basketball team of Carolina is called "Los Gigantes de Carolina" (The Carolina Giants) and the town has dedicated a museum to the memory of Birriel and has also named a street "El Paseo Felipe Birriel".

Wanda de Jesús Arvelo, an author from Carolina wrote a children's book about Birriel's life titled "Felipe Corazón de Gigantes".

== See also ==
- List of Puerto Ricans
