= Mala Powers =

American actress (1931–2007)

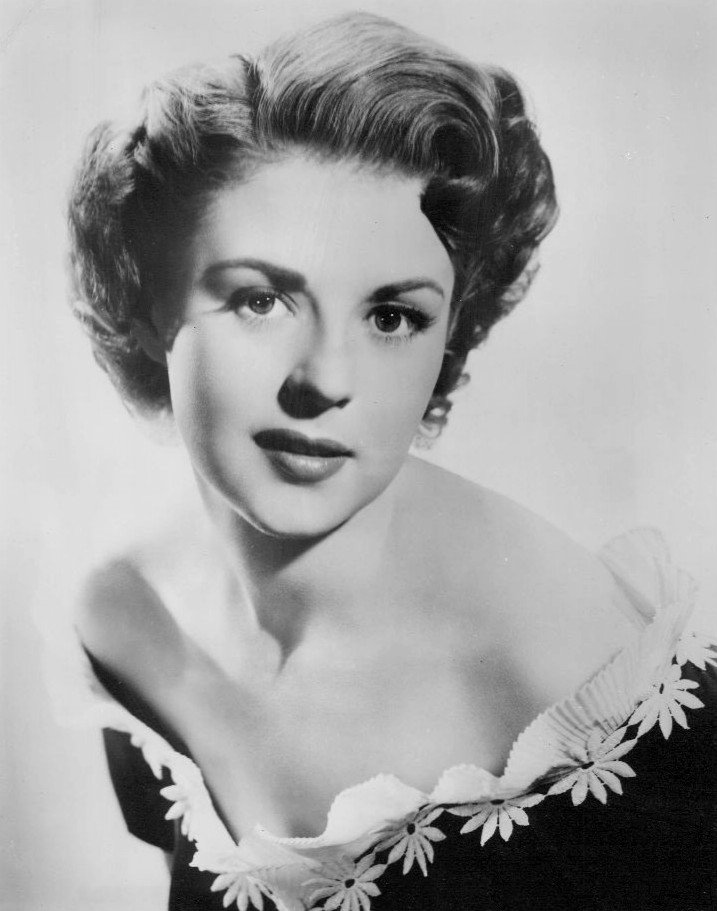
- Powers in 1955
- Born: Mary Ellen Powers; December 20, 1931; San Francisco, California, U.S.
- Died: June 11, 2007 (aged 75); Burbank, California, U.S.
- Occupation: Actress
- Years active: 1942–2005
- Spouses: Monte Vanton (m. 1954; div. 1962); M. Hughes Miller (m. 1970; died 1989)
- Children: 1

Mary Ellen "Mala" Powers (December 20, 1931 – June 11, 2007) was an American actress.

== Early life ==
Powers was born in San Francisco. Her father was a United Press Associations executive, while her mother was a minister. In 1940, her family moved to Los Angeles. That summer, Powers attended the Max Reinhardt Junior Workshop, where she played her first role in a play before a live audience. She continued with her drama lessons, and a year later, aged 10, she auditioned and won a part in the 1942 Little Tough Guys film Tough as They Come.

Powers later told a reporter, "I've worked in show business since I've been seven."

== Career ==
At the age of 16, Powers began working in radio drama, before becoming a film actress in 1950. Her first movie roles were in Outrage and Edge of Doom in 1950. The same year, Stanley Kramer signed Powers to star with José Ferrer in what may be her most-remembered role as Roxane in Cyrano de Bergerac. She was nominated for a Golden Globe Award for her part in this movie.

At age 19, while on a USO entertainment tour in Korea in 1951, she contracted a blood disease and nearly died. She was treated with chloromycetin, but a severe allergic reaction resulted in the loss of much of her bone marrow. Powers barely survived, and her recovery took nearly nine months.

She began working again in 1952, including the lead in Rose of Cimarron (1952) and co-starring roles in City Beneath the Sea (1953) and City That Never Sleeps (1953), but she still was taking medication.

Following her recovery, she appeared in Bengazi (1955) and B-movies such as Rage at Dawn (1955), The Storm Rider (1957), and Sierra Baron (1958), and science-fiction films, including The Unknown Terror (1957), The Colossus of New York (1958), Flight of the Lost Balloon (1961), and Doomsday Machine (1972). She had larger roles in Tammy and the Bachelor (1957) and Daddy's Gone A-Hunting (1969). In 1957, she was cast in Man on the Prowl.

She appeared in more than 100 TV episodes, including Appointment with Adventure, Crossroads, Mr. Adams and Eve, The Restless Gun, Wagon Train, Bourbon Street Beat, The Rebel, Maverick (in an episode called "Dutchman's Gold" with Roger Moore), The Everglades, Bonanza, The Man from U.N.C.L.E. (The Virtue Affair), Mission: Impossible, Bewitched, The Wild Wild West, The Silent Force, Cheyenne (episodes "Alibi for the Scalped Man" (1960) and "Trouble Street" (1961)), and the Wanted: Dead or Alive episode "Till Death Do Us Part", with Steve McQueen. In 1962, she portrayed Loretta Opel, a woman with leprosy, in the episode "A Woman's Place" on CBS's Rawhide.

On Perry Mason, Powers made five appearances in the 1950s and 1960s. She was cast as defendant Clair Allison in the 1959 episode "The Case of the Deadly Toy". She also played defendant June Sinclair in the 1960 episode "The Case of the Crying Cherub". Her most memorable role was as defendant Janet Brent, friend of Perry's secretary Della Street (Barbara Hale), in the 1962 episode "The Case of the Weary Watchdog". In 1964, she portrayed Helen Bradshaw in "The Case of the Frightened Fisherman", and in 1966, she played murder victim Elaine Bayler in "The Case of the Scarlet Scandal".

Powers played the recurring character Mona during the final season of Hazel (1965–66). In 1971, Powers was cast in 15 episodes of the television series The Man and the City. Powers narrated Follow the Star, a Christmas album from RCA Victor.

Powers was a successful children's author of Follow the Star, Follow the Year, and Dial a Story. She also revised and edited two books by Enid Blyton after the author's death.

== Artistry ==
Powers trained directly under Michael Chekhov for many years during her time in Hollywood in both group and private sessions. During this period, Powers and Chekhov grew very close, and after his death, she was named executrix of the Chekhov estate. She continued the development and proliferation of the Chekhov technique throughout the United States and the world. Powers was instrumental in publishing Chekhov's books On the Technique of Acting, To the Actor, and The Path of the Actor. She also published Chekhov's audio series "On Theatre and the Art of Acting", to which she added a 60-page study guide. She co-narrated with Gregory Peck a documentary on Chekhov titled From Russia to Hollywood, which was co-produced by her colleague Lisa Loving.

From 1993 to 2006, Mala Powers taught the Chekhov technique at the University of Southern Maine’s summer acting programme as part of the Michael Chekhov Theatre Institute, where she instructed both actors and acting teachers. Throughout this period, Powers co-founded the National Michael Chekhov Association with her colleagues Wil Kilroy and Lisa Dalton. Kilroy and Dalton continue to teach the curriculum originally developed by the trio in Maine.

Powers was the Michael Chekhov estate executrix. She was patron of the Michael Chekhov Studio in London.

== Personal life ==
In 1954, Mala Powers married Monte Vanton, with whom she had a son, Toren Vanton. The couple divorced in 1962. In 1970, Powers married M. Hughes Miller, a book publisher. They were together until his death in 1989.

== Death ==
Powers died from complications of leukemia on June 11, 2007, at Providence Saint Joseph Medical Center in Burbank, California. She was survived by her son. Shortly before her death, she had been on a lecture tour at universities.

She has a star on the Hollywood Walk of Fame at 6360 Hollywood Boulevard. She was cremated at the Hollywood Hills Forest Lawn Memorial Park and her ashes returned to family.

== Radio appearances ==
Year	Program	Episode/source
1952	Stars over Hollywood	Command Performance

== Partial filmography ==
- Tough as They Come (1942) as Esther Clark
- Edge of Doom (1950) as Julie
- Outrage (1950) as Ann Walton
- Cyrano de Bergerac (1950) as Roxane
- Rose of Cimarron (1952) as Rose of Cimarron
- City Beneath the Sea (1953) as Terry McBride
- City That Never Sleeps (1953) as Sally 'Angel Face' Connors
- Geraldine (1953) as Janey Edwards
- The Yellow Mountain (1954) as Nevada Wray
- Rage at Dawn (1955) as Laura Reno
- Bengazi (1955) as Aileen Donovan
- The Storm Rider (1957) as Tay Rorick
- Tammy and the Bachelor (1957) as Barbara Bissle
- The Unknown Terror (1957) as Gina Matthews
- Death in Small Doses (1957) as Val Owens
- Man on the Prowl (1957) as Marian Wood
- The Colossus of New York (1958) as Anne Spensser
- Sierra Baron (1958) as Sue Russell
- The Restless Gun (1958), episode "Take Me Home"
- The Restless Gun (1959), episode "The Lady and the Gun"
- Bonanza (1959), episode "The Philip Deidesheimer Story"
- Bronco (1960), episode "Montana Passage" as Ruth Miller
- Fear No More (1961) as Sharon Carlin
- Flight of the Lost Balloon (1961) as Ellen Burton
- The Wild, Wild West (1966), episode "The Night of the Big Blast" as Lily Fortune
- Rogue's Gallery (1968) as Maggie
- Daddy's Gone A-Hunting (1969) as Meg Stone
- Doomsday Machine aka Escape from Planet Earth (1972) as Major Georgianna Bronski
- Where the Wind Dies (1976)
- Six Tickets to Hell (1981)
- Hitters (2002) as Mama Theresa
