= Bengazi (film) =

1955 American drama film directed by John Brahm

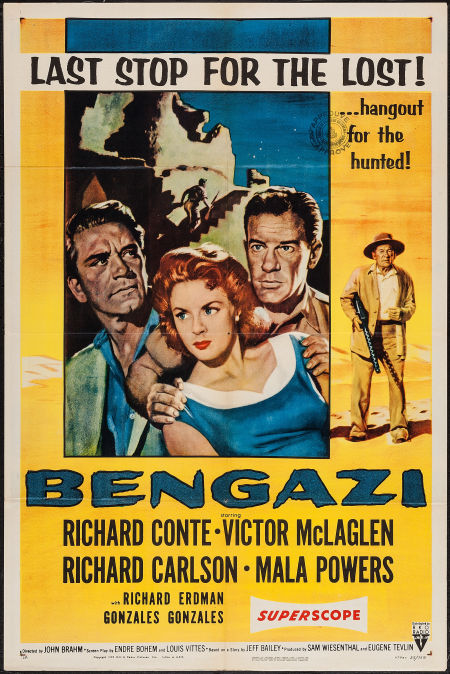
- Directed by: John Brahm
- Written by: Jeff Bailey; Endre Bohem; Louis Vittes
- Produced by: Eugene Tevlin; Sam Wiesenthal
- Starring: Richard Conte; Victor McLaglen; Richard Carlson; Mala Powers
- Cinematography: Joseph F. Biroc
- Edited by: Robert Golden
- Music by: Roy Webb
- Distributed by: RKO Radio Pictures
- Release date: September 14, 1955 (US)
- Running time: 79 minutes
- Country: United States
- Language: English

Bengazi is a 1955 American crime drama film directed by John Brahm and starring Richard Conte, Victor McLaglen, and Richard Carlson.

== Plot ==
Several adventurers hunt for treasure in the desert near the Libyan town of Benghazi.

== Cast ==
- Richard Conte as John Gillmore
- Victor McLaglen as Robert Emmett Donovan
- Richard Carlson as Insp. Levering
- Mala Powers as Aileen Donovan
- Richard Erdman as Selby
- Pedro Gonzalez Gonzalez as Kamal (as Gonzales Gonzales)
- Hillary Brooke as Nora Nielson
- Maurice Hill as Peters (as Maury Hill)
- Jay Novello as Basim
- Albert Carrier as MacMillan
- Eileen Rowe as Lily

== See also ==
- List of American films of 1955
- 2012 Benghazi attack
