= On Your Way, Riley =

1982 play by Alan Plater

Brian Murphy as Arthur Lucan in On Your Way, Riley

On Your Way, Riley is a 1982 play by Alan Plater and a 1985 Yorkshire Television drama of the same name about the private and theatrical partnership of husband and wife 'Old Mother Riley' music hall performers Arthur Lucan and Kitty McShane.

With songs by Alex Glasgow, the musical play On Your Way, Riley! premiered at the Theatre Royal Stratford East in April 1982. The original cast included Geoffrey Freshwater and Robert Daws, with Brian Murphy and Maureen Lipman as Lucan and McShane. The play was directed by Philip Hedley A 1983 tour of the play had John Halstead and Yvonne Edgell in the leading roles.

The play was adapted for television, without the songs, as On Your Way, Riley, and was broadcast on ITV on 2 January 1985, again with Brian Murphy and Maureen Lipman as Lucan and McShane. The play was based on the deteriorating marital relationship between the two main characters, with Lucan expressing his feelings about his wife's many infidelities. This was paralleled with their on-stage personas, where Old Mother Riley (Lucan) is concerned about the whereabouts of her daughter Kitty (McShane) in the evenings, and who she is seeing. The 70 minute TV drama was directed by John Glenister.

== TV Cast ==
- Brian Murphy - Arthur Lucan (Old Mother Riley)
- Maureen Lipman - Kitty McShane (Kitty Riley)
- Norman Bird - Frank
- Hugh Futcher - Ossie
- Peta Bernard - Dorothy
- Michael Kingsbury - Danny
- Vera Jones - Diane
- Tommy Fossett - Charlie
- Lesley Scoble - dancer (credited as Lisa Scoble)
- Teri Scoble - dancer
