= Sarah Broshar =

American film editor (born 1980)

Sarah Broshar is an American film editor.

== Biography ==
Broshar grew up in Michigan. She was educated at Northwestern University and the AFI Conservatory, graduating from the latter in 2005. She began her career as an editorial intern on Sky Captain and the World of Tomorrow (2004), before joining the Fox Broadcasting Company, where she edited commercials for their television shows.

In the mid-2000s, she started working with Michael Kahn, known for his longtime collaboration with Steven Spielberg. The first Spielberg film she worked on with Kahn was The Adventures of Tintin. She continued working with Spielberg over the following years, first as an assistant editor, then co-editing The Post (2017), Ready Player One (2018), West Side Story (2021) and The Fabelmans (2022). Her latest collaboration with Spielberg is 2026's Disclosure Day.

== Filmography ==
Features as editor

- How I Got Lost (2009)
- The Last Survivors (2014)
- The Post (2017), with Michael Kahn
- Ready Player One (2018), with Michael Kahn
- Higher Power (2018), with Saul Herckis and Matthew Charles Santoro
- Pet Sematary (2019)
- West Side Story (2021), with Michael Kahn
- The Fabelmans (2022), with Michael Kahn
- Waitress: The Musical (2023), with Marko Keser and David Tregoning
- Snow White (2025), with Mark Sanger
- Disclosure Day (2026)

As additional editor

- All the Days Before Tomorrow (2007)
- Bridge of Spies (2015)
- The BFG (2016)

As assistant editor

- The Spiderwick Chronicles (2008)
- Prince of Persia: The Sands of Time (2010)
- Pirates of the Caribbean: On Stranger Tides (2011, additional assistant editor)
- Wilde Salomé (2011)
- The Adventures of Tintin (2011)
- War Horse (2011, first assistant editor)
- A Thousand Words (2012)
- Lincoln (2012, first assistant editor)
