= Jeffersonville, Madison and Indianapolis Railroad =

Railroad in the United States (1866–1890)

Overview
- Headquarters: Indianapolis, Indiana, U.S.
- Locale: Indiana
- Dates of operation: 1866–1890
- Predecessor: Indianapolis and Madison Railroad; Jeffersonvile Railroad
- Successor: Pittsburgh, Cincinnati and St. Louis Railway

Technical
- Track gauge: 4 ft 8 1/2 in (1,435 mm) standard gauge

The Jeffersonville, Madison and Indianapolis Railroad (JM&I) was formed in 1866 as a merger between the Indianapolis and Madison Railroad and the Jeffersonville Railroad.

== Genealogy ==
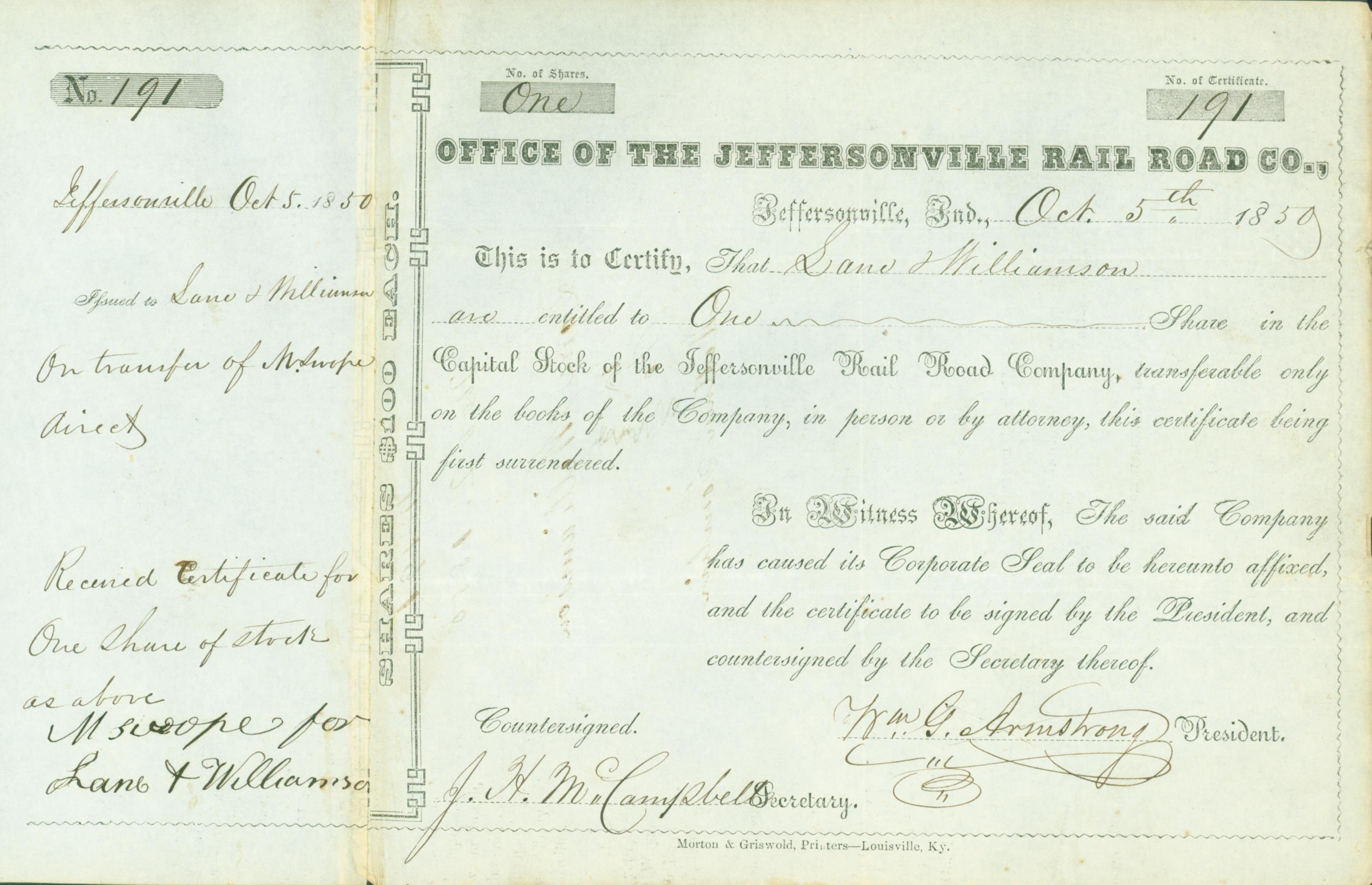
Transfer certificate of the Jeffersonville Rail Road Company, issued October 5, 1850

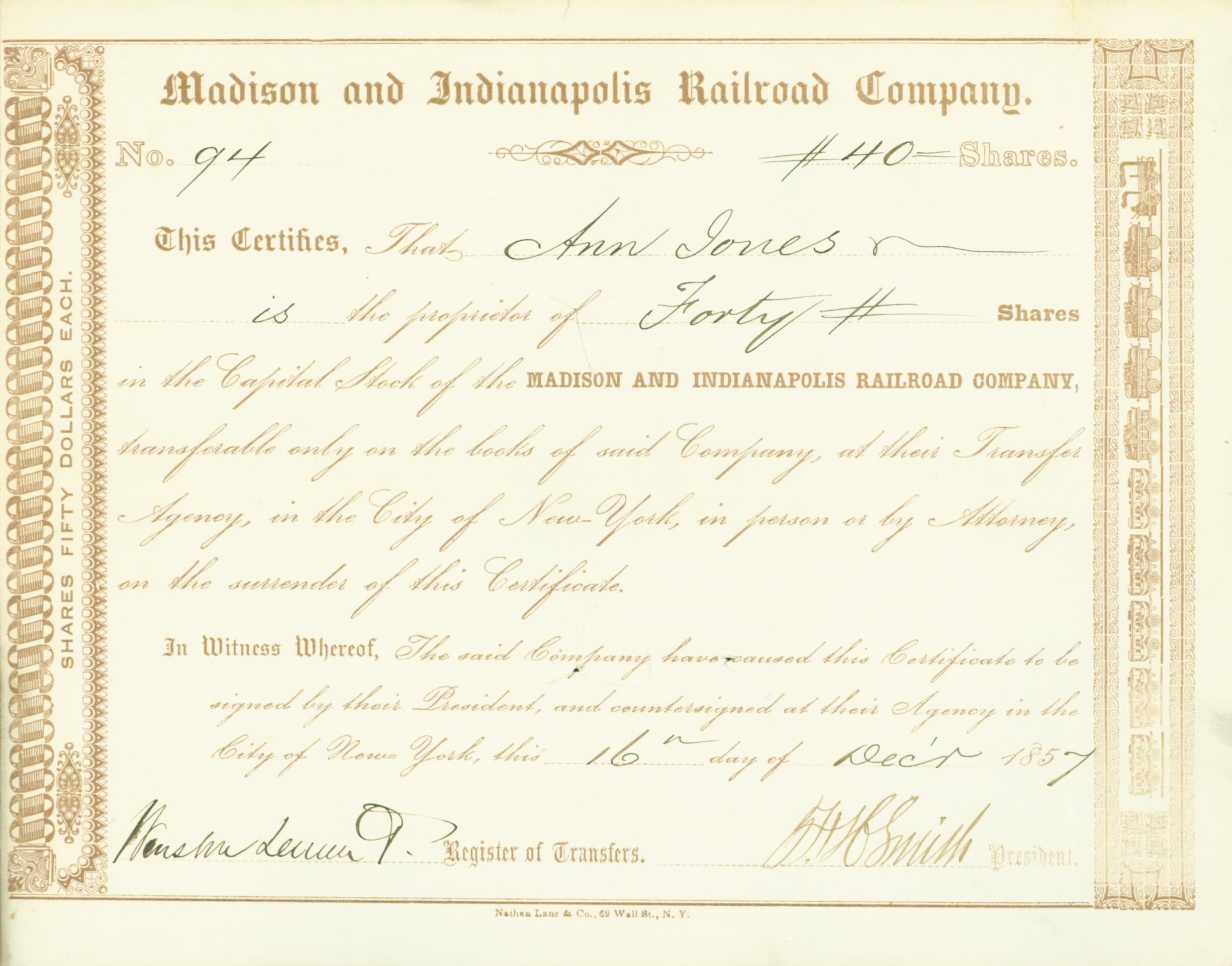
Share of the Madison and Indianapolis Railroad Company, issued December 16, 1857

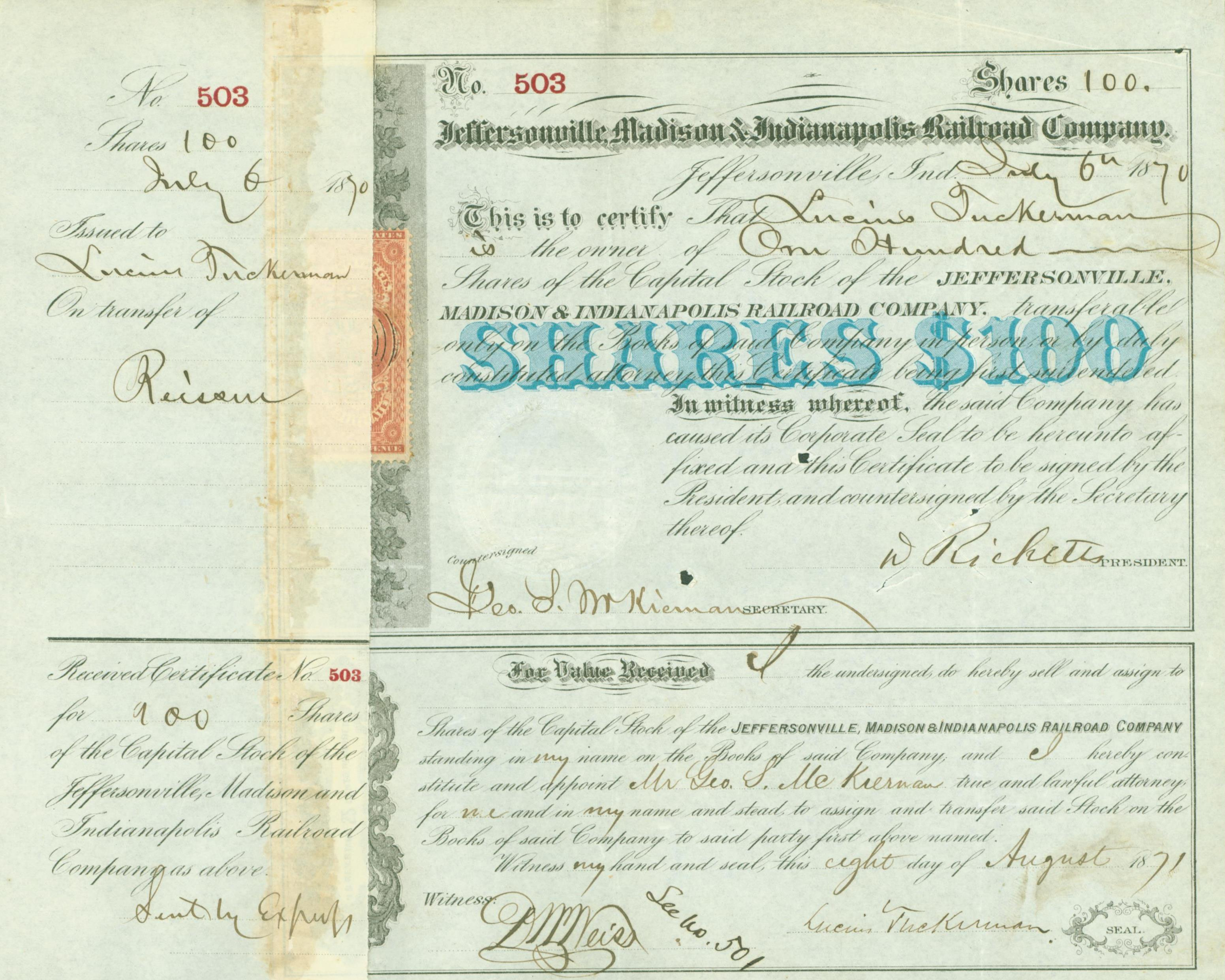
Share of the Jeffersonville, Madison & Indianapolis Railroad Company, issued August 8, 1871

The JM&I predecessors were as follows:

- Jeffersonville, Madison and Indianapolis Railroad
  - Indianapolis and Madison Railroad 1866
    - Madison and Indianapolis Railroad 1862
      - Madison, Indianapolis & Lafayette Railroad 1843
  - Jeffersonville Railroad 1866
    - Ohio and Indianapolis Railway 1849
    - Knightstown & Shelbyville Railroad 1852 (abandoned 1868)
    - Shelbyville Lateral Railroad 1851 (abandoned 1867)
  - Shelby and Rush Railroad 1882
    - Rushville and Shelbyville Railroad 1859
  - Columbus and Shelby Railroad 1881
  - Lake Erie and Louisville Railroad 1890
    - Lake Erie and Pacific Railroad 1865
    - Fremont, Lima & Union Railroad 1865
      - The Fremont and Indiana Railroad 1861

== History ==
The Ohio and Indianapolis Railroad was chartered February 3, 1832, to build a line from Indianapolis south to the Ohio River at Jeffersonville, Indiana. The company was not organized until March 17, 1848, and on February 3, 1849, it was renamed the Jeffersonville Railroad.

The first section, from Jeffersonville to just north of Memphis, Indiana, opened in 1850. The next year it leased the Knightstown and Shelbyville Railroad, starting to operate it in 1852. The line opened north to Columbus in August 1852, and on September 1, 1852, it began operating the Rushville and Shelbyville Railroad under lease.

On January 27, 1836, an act of the Indiana General Assembly established Indiana's first railroad to actually be built. Construction began on the state-owned Madison and Indianapolis Railroad on September 16, 1836. After building only 27.80 miles (44.74 km) from Madison to Queensville (just northwest of North Vernon in Jennings County) by 1841, the railroad was transferred to private ownership on June 20, 1842, as the Madison and Indianapolis Railroad Company. This entity completed the remainder of the line from Queensville to Indianapolis, a distance of 57.99 miles (93.33 km), by 1847. Although it was successful for more than a decade, it went into decline, was sold at foreclosure on March 27, 1862, and renamed the Indianapolis and Madison Railroad (I&M). The successor company abandoned the M&I's 10.09 miles (16.24 km) of trackage between Columbus and Edinburgh in 1864 and began running over the Jeffersonville Railroad's nearby tracks.

Organized on April 30, 1866, for the purpose of uniting the two lines, the Jeffersonville, Madison and Indianapolis Railroad Company (JM&I) absorbed the Indianapolis & Madison the next day, with the Jeffersonville Railroad being officially merged in on June 1 of that same year, upon the filing of the Articles of Consolidation.

On May 22, 1868, the Reno Gang held up the JM&I Railroad train at Marshfield, Scott County, Indiana, and escaped with $90,000 in cash described as being in "new notes." The money was never officially recovered and in today's value, represented more than $2 million.

The Scottsburg Depot opened in 1872. It was placed on the National Register of Historic Places in 1991.

== See also ==
- List of bridges documented by the Historic American Engineering Record in Indiana
