= L for Lester =

- Genre: Sitcom
- Created by: Dudley Long
- Directed by: John B Hobbs
- Starring: Brian Murphy; Amanda Barrie; Hilda Braid; Linda Robson
- Country of origin: United Kingdom
- No. of series: 1
- No. of episodes: 6

Production
- Running time: 30 minutes

Original release
- Network: BBC2
- Release: 8 October – 12 November 1982

L for Lester is a BBC sitcom first broadcast in 1982, starring Brian Murphy. The programme followed the misfortunes of a small town driving instructor. It was intended as a new vehicle for Murphy after his previous hit show, George and Mildred, was axed following the sudden death of Yootha Joyce in 1980.

== Premise ==
Lester Small is a driving instructor in a quiet West Country town with a reputation for taking on clients that cause havoc and mayhem whenever they are on the road. His most consistent pupil is the hapless Mrs Davies, who usually drives into a perilous situation in each episode where Lester's car is usually either badly damaged or destroyed in the process (e.g. through a level crossing onto railway tracks, into a river, onto a firing range, and with a leaking petrol tank (on two occasions; the first time after Mrs Davies crashes into a barn, the second when a passing cyclist discards a cigarette).

None of these antics ingratiate Lester to either the local police chief (with whom he has a long standing feud), or with his bank manager from whom he keeps having to borrow more money to repair or replace the damaged vehicles. All this puts a strain on his long suffering wife (Amanda Barrie) and secretary (Linda Robson). One of the few people who benefits from Lester's misadventures is the owner of a vehicle repair/garage/used car business with dodgy/shady connections.

== Reception ==
The series was a ratings failure and received mixed reviews from critics, and therefore was not renewed beyond its original run.
