= Man on the Prowl (film) =

1957 film by Art Napoleon

- Theatrical release poster
- Directed by: Art Napoleon
- Screenplay by: Art Napoleon; Jo Napoleon
- Produced by: Art Napoleon; Jo Napoleon
- Starring: Mala Powers; James Best; Ted de Corsia; Jerry Paris; Vivi Janiss
- Cinematography: Nicholas Musuraca
- Edited by: Paul Weatherwax
- Music by: Ernest Gold
- Production company: Jana Films
- Distributed by: United Artists
- Release date: December 1, 1957
- Running time: 86 minutes
- Country: United States
- Language: English

Man on the Prowl is a 1957 American film noir crime film directed by Art Napoleon and written by Art Napoleon and Jo Napoleon. The film stars Mala Powers, James Best, Ted de Corsia, Jerry Paris and Vivi Janiss. The film was released on December 1, 1957, by United Artists.

== Plot ==
Under psychiatric care for several years, unknown to his employers, Doug Gerhardt has a job with a car dealership. He borrows a luxury convertible without permission to impress a date, but when she resists his advances at a motel, Doug kills her.

On the way home, Doug nearly runs over Marian Wood and her son. Still obsessed with women, Doug steals a toy belonging to the boy as an excuse for looking up Marian later. He ingratiates himself with Marian at home by repairing her washing machine, then preys on her frustration with husband Woody's frequent absence.

Doug's mother comes to see Marian, warning her about Doug's mental state and mistakenly believing Marian is romantically involved with him. Marian threatens to notify the police, after which Doug murders his mother, assaults Woody and takes their sons captive. About to sexually assault Marian, he is wounded when she stabs him with a nail file, then killed by police as he tries to stop her children from escaping.

== Cast ==
- Mala Powers as Marian Wood
- James Best as Doug Gerhardt
- Ted de Corsia as Detective
- Jerry Paris as Woody
- Vivi Janiss as Mrs. Gerhardt
- Josh Freeman as Josh Wood
- Jeff Freeman as Jeff Wood
- Peggy Maley as Alma Doran
- Eugenia Paul as Dorothy Pierce
- Bob Yeakel as himself

== Home media ==
On August 12, 2015, Alpha Video announced that they had located the only surviving print of Man on the Prowl, and that it'd be released on DVD in the near future.
