= The Activist (1969 film) =

1969 film

- Theatrical release poster
- Directed by: Art Napoleon
- Written by: Art Napoleon; Jo Napoleon
- Produced by: Art Napoleon; Jo Napoleon
- Starring: Michael Smith; Lesley Taplin; Tom Maier; Brian Murphy
- Edited by: Michael Kahn; Gilbert D. Marchant
- Production company: Jana Films
- Distributed by: Universal (as Regional Film Distributors)
- Release date: December 10, 1969
- Running time: 87 minutes
- Country: United States
- Language: English

The Activist is a 1969 American drama film directed by Art Napoleon and written by Art Napoleon and Jo Napoleon. It depicts the conflicts of a college student who, after appearing on television news decrying the Vietnam War, is torn between engaging in further anti-war protests and settling for conventional happiness with his new girlfriend. The film stars Michael Smith, who had been an actual member of the Oakland Seven, an anti-war group involved in the planning of the 1967 Stop the Draft Week. Co-star Lesley Taplin also alternated between community activism and acting at the time of production.

Also starring in the film are Tom Maier and Brian Murphy. Also, the parents of filmmaker Michael Ritchie, Benbow Ritchie and Patricia Ritchie, briefly appear as a suburban couple upset by the lead character when he appears in their neighborhood.

The film received an X rating due to a graphic (for the time) love scene between Smith and Taplin. It was released on December 10, 1969, by Universal Pictures' shadow company Regional Film Distributors, a division created to handle films either receiving an X rating or deemed too esoteric for the studio to be associated with.

== Cast ==
- Michael Smith as Mike Corbett
- Lesley Taplin (billed as Lesley Gilbrun) as Lee James
- Tom Maier as Prof. Peter Williams
- Brian Murphy as Member of Steering Committee
