= Scott County Home =

Historic place in Indiana, United States

- U.S. National Register of Historic Places
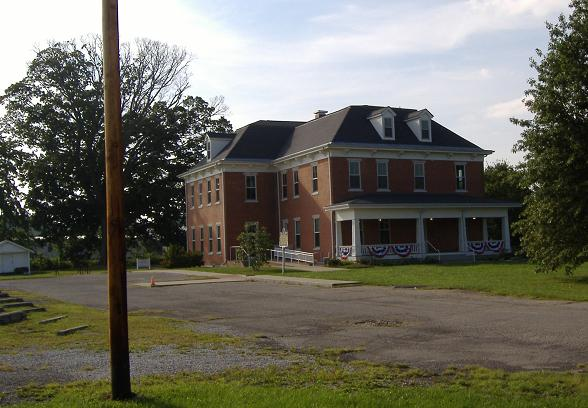

- Location within Indiana Location within the United States
- Coordinates: 38°40′25″N 85°46′14″W
- Area: 4.2 acres (1.7 ha)
- Built: 1892
- Architect: Wiley, Johan J.
- NRHP reference No.: 00000530
- Added to NRHP: May 26, 2000

The Scott County Home is a historic county home located one mile south of Scottsburg, Indiana. The original County Home was built in 1872 to replace the previous County Home located in Lexington, Indiana. Also known as the "Poor Farm", the County Home was originally a frame house, but was replaced with the current brick structure in 1892. The County Home was used to house the poor, indigent and physically and mentally handicapped. In 1973 the Home was no longer in use, though various agencies maintained offices there. Vacated by Scott County in 1997 when the Scott County Courthouse addition and renovation was completed, the property was given to Preservation Alliance, Inc. for the purpose of establishing a county museum. In 2001 it became the Scott County Heritage Center and Museum. Today the Museum hosts local exhibits related to Scott County history, such as the Pigeon Roost Massacre, General John Hunt Morgan's Raid, and the Marshfield train robbery by the Reno Brothers.

It was listed on the National Register of Historic Places in 2000.
