= Do Go On =

British radio programme

- Genre: Comedy radio
- Running time: 30 minutes
- Country of origin: United Kingdom
- Language(s): English
- Home station: BBC Radio 4
- Starring: Griff Rhys Jones; Graeme Garden; Geoffrey McGivern; Melanie Hudson
- Produced by: TalkBack Productions
- Original release: 1997

Do Go On is a spoof radio show which first aired in 1997 on BBC Radio 4. The show won the comedy 2nd prize at the Sony Radio Awards.

The show featured Griff Rhys Jones as Ainsley Elliott, Graeme Garden, Geoffrey McGivern and Melanie Hudson and was produced by TalkBack Productions.
