= Brian Murphy (actor) =

English actor (1932–2025)

- Born: Brian Trevor John Murphy; 25 September 1932; Ventnor, Isle of Wight, England
- Died: 2 February 2025 (aged 92); Kent, England
- Occupation: Actor
- Years active: 1956–2025
- Known for: George Roper in the television series Man About the House and George and Mildred; Alvin Smedley in the television series Last of the Summer Wine
- Spouses: Carol Gibson (m. 1957, divorced); Linda Regan (m. 1995)
- Children: 2

Brian Trevor John Murphy (25 September 1932 – 2 February 2025) was an English actor. He was best known as the henpecked husband George Roper in the popular sitcom Man About the House and its spin-off series George and Mildred. He also played Alvin Smedley in Last of the Summer Wine, and other notable roles included Stan the shopkeeper in the 1990s children's series Wizadora, and Maurice in the comedy drama series The Booze Cruise. He also had a prolific career on stage.

== Early life ==
Murphy was born in Ventnor on the Isle of Wight, on 25 September 1932. He was the son of grocer's assistant Gerald Murphy and his wife Mabel, both of whom later became restaurateurs. His two brothers Ken and Eric died during active service in the Second World War. He was called up to do his national service at RAF Northwood, where he met future The Good Life actor Richard Briers. Upon leaving the RAF the two aspiring actors both performed in productions by the Dramatic Society at the Borough Polytechnic Institute (now London South Bank University).

== Career ==
=== Early career ===
Murphy was a member of the Theatre Workshop and a jobbing actor in the 1960s and early 1970s, combining his theatre work with guest appearances in television shows such as The Avengers, Z-Cars, Callan and Dixon of Dock Green. He also starred in Littlewood's film Sparrows Can't Sing (1963) alongside his Theatre Workshop peers including Yootha Joyce, Barbara Windsor, Stephen Lewis, Bob Grant and Roy Kinnear. Other film roles at this time included San Ferry Ann (1965; also starring Windsor), The Activist (1969), The Devils (1971) and The Boy Friend (1971).

By the early 1970s, Murphy was considering giving up acting in order to become an insurance salesman, however he was cast in an episode of the sitcom Alcock and Gander (1972) which was written by Johnnie Mortimer and Brian Cooke. The pair were impressed by Murphy's performance and offered him a role in their then-forthcoming sitcom Man About the House which would make him a household name.

=== Man About the House and George and Mildred ===
Murphy first came to prominence in the ITV television sitcom Man About the House, playing George Roper, whose wife, Mildred, played by Yootha Joyce, was a domineering social climber – a sharp contrast to the character of George, a lazy landlord whose desire was for an easy and quiet life. The pairing was an instant hit. A contributing factor to the actors' immediate chemistry was that they had been friends for many years. Aside from their Theatre Workshop years, Murphy also featured opposite Joyce in Sparrows Can't Sing (1963).

When Man About The House ended in 1976, a spin-off was created for Murphy and Joyce, titled George and Mildred. This ran for five series until 1979. In 1978 he released the single "Jogging" (b/w "The Great Gnome Robbery"), recorded in the persona of George, on the Pye label. Murphy later said, "Out of the blue I was requested to record 'Jogging' in the manner of George, and naturally could not refuse. I had been told I had an excellent singing voice and in fact did some training, but sadly I lacked confidence and missed opportunities – one of my biggest regrets." Murphy reprised his role in feature films of both sitcoms. Owing to their success, Murphy and Joyce starred in the London Palladium's pantomime in 1976. From 1977 to 1978, they reprised their roles as George and Mildred in a stage version of the show, which toured the UK in various theatres, including a summer season at Bournemouth's Pier Theatre. In 1979, Murphy and Joyce toured Australia and New Zealand in the stage show.

Joyce and Murphy became concerned over typecasting, and they agreed with the producers that the then-forthcoming sixth series of George and Mildred would be its last. However, Joyce died in 1980, and the planned final series of George and Mildred was cancelled. Murphy was at Joyce's bedside when she died.

=== After George and Mildred ===
In 1981 another television sitcom, The Incredible Mr. Tanner, was created specifically for Murphy with him in the title role and featuring regular Man About The House and George and Mildred co-star Roy Kinnear. However, the show failed to gain popularity. He moved to the BBC in 1982 for the driving school TV sitcom L for Lester opposite Amanda Barrie, but this was also a ratings failure and was cancelled after just six episodes. In 1982, he appeared in the Eric Sykes comedy short film It's Your Move; Murphy had previously had a role in Sykes' film of The Plank in 1979. From 1984 to 1985, Murphy had a main role in the BBC sitcom Lame Ducks, in which he played a private investigator. In 1985, he reprised his acclaimed role of Arthur Lucan from the stage, in a television film On Your Way Riley, alongside Maureen Lipman. From October 1987 to July 1991, Murphy played Ernest Bond in BBC Radio 4's drama series Citizens.

From 1993 to 1997, Murphy played shopkeeper Stan in the children's television series Wizadora. Murphy was the subject of This Is Your Life in 1998.

=== Last of the Summer Wine and others ===
Murphy continued to appear regularly on television, most notably as "Alvin Smedley" in Last of the Summer Wine from 2003 to 2010, and also with roles in The Bill (as a drunken tramp dressed as an elf at Christmas); comedy series Pond Life, an animation series, as Len Pond, the father of protagonist Dolly Pond (Sarah Ann Kennedy), One Foot in the Grave starring Richard Wilson (playing a character called Mr Foskett); and Brookside;

In 2010, Murphy appeared in an episode of Hustle called "The Thieving Mistake". He later made appearances in comedy shows The Catherine Tate Show, This Is Jinsy and Benidorm. Murphy can also be seen in all three episodes of the ITV comedy The Booze Cruise, playing Maurice. He also appeared as Frank Dobson in The Cafe from 2011 and 2013, and also in the Channel 4 comedy Man Down as music teacher Frank Field-Williams in the 2013 Christmas special. Murphy also played Robert Collins in an episode of the audio series of Doctor Who by Big Finish Productions in an episode entitled "The Home Guard" in November 2019. In 2022 and 2023, he appeared in several Channel 5 documentaries discussing his work on Man About the House, George and Mildred and Last of the Summer Wine.

In 2023, Murphy wrote the introduction to the autobiography of his Oh, What a Lovely War! co-star Larry Dann. Murphy appeared for three episodes - along with his wife, Linda Regan - playing the role of Mayor, Lord Palmer, in podcast sitcom Barmy Dale. He continued to work until the end of his life, and was set to appear in a film with his wife that would have begun shooting in June 2025.

== Personal life and death ==
Murphy married Carol Gibson in 1957; they had two children, Trevor and Kevin, and fostered many others. In 1995 he married Hi-de-Hi! actress Linda Regan. They lived in Kent.

His grandson is Martin Murphy, a writer, director, and performer, whose recent writing credits include The Ghost of White Hart Lane (2024), along with Midas (2023) and Jonny Feathers the Rock & Roll Pigeon (2022) both at the Park Theatre.

Murphy died of cancer at his home in Kent, on 2 February 2025, at the age of 92.

== Acting credits ==
=== Film ===
Year	Title	Role	Notes
1963	Sparrows Can't Sing	Jack	
1964	Love and Maud Carver	Guardsman	
1965	San Ferry Ann	British Tourist at Garage	
1969	The Activist	Member of Steering Committee	
1971	The Devils	Adam	
1971	The Boy Friend	Peter	
1972	The Ragman's Daughter	Tony's Father	
1974	Man About the House	George Roper	
1976	I'm Not Feeling Myself Tonight	Caretaker	
1979	The Plank	Truck Driver	
1980	George and Mildred	George Roper	
1981	Black Jack	Archibald	
1982	It's Your Move	Chauffeur	
1997	Day Release		
2000	The Mumbo Jumbo	Mr. Tipple	
2003	The Booze Cruise	Maurice Stringer	
2005	Room 36	George Roberts	
2005	The Booze Cruise II: The Treasure Hunt	Maurice Stringer	
2006	The Booze Cruise III: The Scattering	Maurice Stringer	
2011	Grave Tales	Arthur	
2011	The Estate	Geoff	
2012	Blitz and Bananas	Clarence Spratt	
2012	Run For Your Wife	Allotment Man	Cameo

=== Television ===
Year	Title	Role	Notes
1960	Probation Officer	Max Fletcher	Episode: "#2.1"
1961	The Avengers	Haslam	Episode: "The Springers"
1961	The Interrogator	Corporal Doggart	TV film
1962	Z-Cars	Wallace Brackett	2 episodes
1963	ITV Television Playhouse	Man with Alsatian	Episode: "The Wedding Dress"
1963	The Plane Makers	Sorbo	Episode: "Costigan's Rocket"
1964	Six	Mr. Gowing	Episode: "The Diary of a Nobody: The Domestic Jottings of a City Clerk"
1965	Not So Much a Programme, More a Way of Life	Various	24 episodes
1965	A World of Comedy	Motorist	2 episodes
1965	Blackmail	Talbut	Episode: "Cobb"
1966	Hope and Keen		Episode: "S.S. Bounty"
1966	Drama 61-67	Nick	Episode: "Drama '66: A Hero of Modern Industry"
1966	Blackmail	Fletcher	Episode: "Vacant Possession"
1967	The White Rabbit	Perkins	Episode: "The Beginning"
1967	Baker's Half-Dozen	Various	5 episodes
1968	Love Story	Party guest	Episode: "S for Sugar, A for Apple, M for Missing"
1968	Goodbye Again	Various	Episode: #1.1
1968	Resurrection	Kriltsov	2 episodes
1969	Sez Les	Various	12 episodes
1970	The Misfit	The drunk	Episode: "On Protest"
1970	Never Mind the Quality, Feel the Width	Park Keeper	Episode: "Miracles to Measure"
1970	ITV Playhouse	Driver	Episode: "A Sound from the Sea"
1972	The Moonstone	Septimus Luker	3 episodes
1972	Callan	Reeves	Episode: "None of Your Business"
1972	Alcock and Gander	Pluthero	Episode: "Soho Is Too Small"
1972	Dixon of Dock Green	Percy Sinclair	Episode: "Ada"
1973	The Unpleasantness at the Bellona Club	Detective	Episode: "Mr. Oliver"
1973–1976	Man About the House	George Roper	All 39 episodes
1974	South Riding	Mr Hubbard	Episode: "In Sickness and in Health"
1976–1979	George and Mildred	George Roper	All 38 episodes
1981	The Incredible Mr Tanner	Ernest Tanner	All 6 episodes
1981	Theatre Box	Hubert Dibble	Episode: "Reasons to Be Cheerful"
1982	L for Lester	Lester Small	All 6 episodes
1984–1985	Lame Ducks	Ansell	11 episodes
1985	On Your Way, Riley	Arthur Lucan; Old Mother Riley	TV film
1986	Reasons to Be Cheerful	King	Episode: "Charlie Chuckles"
1986	Cinderella: The Shoe Must Go On	Amnesia	TV film
1987	All in Good Faith	Greg Sproat	Episode: "The Patience of Job"
1992	Boon	Buster	Episode: "Shot in the Dark"
1993–1997	Wizadora	Stan	Recurring series 1-4, Main series 5-7
1994	One Foot in the Grave	Mr. Foskett	Episode: "The Man Who Blew Away"
1995	Brookside	George Manners	5 episodes
1995	Next of Kin	Salesman	Episode: "Expansion"
1995	Paul Merton's Life of Comedy	Grandad's friend	2 episodes
1996	Delta Wave	Mr. Seffel	Episode: "Dodgy Jammers: Part 2"
1996	Mike and Angelo	Mervyn K. Mertz	Episode: "An Actor's Life for Me"
1996–2000	Pond Life	Len Pond	11 episodes
1997	The Famous Five	Mr. Wooh	Episode: "Five Are Together Again"
1997	Western Lights: Laugh Until You Die	Ricky Chapple	TV film
1997	Paul Merton in Galton and Simpson's...	Father	Episode: "Visiting Day"
1997	Paul Merton in Galton and Simpson's...	Uncle Arthur	Episode: "Being of Sound Mind"
1998	Jonathan Creek	Ken Speed	Episode: "Mother Redcap"
1999	Mrs Merton and Malcolm	Mr Capstick	All 6 episodes
1999	Hilltop Hospital	Dr. Atticus	Voice
1999	Casualty	Walter Burnley	Episode: "To Have and to Hold"
1999	The Bill	Danny the Elf	Episode: "When the Snow Lay Round About"
2000	Sunburn	Sid Dawson	Episode: #2.2
2001	Comedy Lab		Voice; Episode: "Knife & Wife"
2003–2010	Last of the Summer Wine	Alvin Smedley	73 episodes
2004	Monkey Trousers	Various	TV film
2005–2006	The Catherine Tate Show	Neville	5 episodes
2010	The Slammer	Alan	Episode: #1.12
2010	Hustle	Larry	Episode: "The Thieving Mistake"
2010	Paul O'Grady Live	Alvin	Episode: #1.6
2010	Benidorm	Clive Mitchell	Episode: "Christmas Special"
2011	White Van Man	Albert	Episode: "Beginnings and Ends"
2011	This Is Jinsy	Melty Harris	Episode: "Kelpman"
2011–2013	The Cafe	Jack Dobson	9 episodes
2013	Plebs	Victor	Episode: "Bananae"
2013	Man Down	Mr Frank Field-Williams	Episode: "Christmas Special"
2014	It's an Unknown World	George Timemile	Unknown episodes
2014	Holby City	Charlie Evans	Episode: "The Art of Losing"
2016	Casualty	Frank Haines	Episode: "Hopelessly Addicted"
2018	Claude	Mr. Lovelybuns	Voice; Episode: "Gone Sock"
2019	Holby City	Buster Kitchener	Episode: "The Wrong Horse"
2020–2021	Mighty 6	Old Man L.	Voice; 2 episodes
2025	Mr. Bigstuff	Sweet Old Man	Episode: #2.2 (final role, broadcast posthumously)

=== Theatre ===
(incomplete)

Year	Title	Role	Venue
1956	Captain Brassbound's Conversion	Drinkwater	Theatre Royal Stratford East
1957	Macbeth	Fleance	Theatre Royal Stratford East
1958	Room in the Paradise	Villeneuve	Belgrade Theatre, Coventry
1958	A Christmas Carol	Mr. Fezziwig; Old Joe; Topper	Theatre Royal Stratford East
1959	Fings Ain't Wot They Used T'Be	Teddy Morris	Theatre Royal Stratford East
1959	The Hostage	Mr. Mulleady	Theatre Royal Stratford East
1960	Ned Kelly		Theatre Royal Stratford East
1960	Every Man in His Humour	Captain Bobadill	Theatre Royal Stratford East then Théâtre Sarah-Bernhardt, Paris
1960	Sparrers Can’t Sing	Jack Budge	Theatre Royal Stratford East then Maxim Gorki Theater, East Berlin
1961	Progress to the Park	Mr Laughlin	Theatre Royal Stratford East
1961	They Might Be Giants	Wilbur Peabody	Theatre Royal Stratford East
1962	What a Crazy World	Dad	Theatre Royal Stratford East
1963	The Merry Rooster's Panto		Theatre Royal Stratford East
1963–1964	Oh, What a Lovely War!	Pierrot	Theatre Royal Stratford East then Wyndham's Theatre, London
1964	Henry IV	Bardolph	Church of Scotland Assembly Hall, Edinburgh
1964–1965	Oh, What a Lovely War!	Pierrot	Broadhurst Theatre, New York City
1966	The King’s Mare	Cranmer	UK Tour
1967	Just Good Friends		Adeline Genee Theatre, West Sussex
1967	Intrigues and Amours		Theatre Royal Stratford East
1968	A Lily in Little India	George Bland	Newcastle Playhouse
1968	Summer	Lord Garlic	Fortune Theatre, London
1972	Finest Family in the Land	Milton Harris	Theatre Royal Stratford East
1973	Sweeney Todd: The Demon Barber of Fleet Street	Sweeney Todd	Theatre Royal Stratford East
1976	Whoops-a-Daisy	James Wormald	Theatre Royal, Norwich
1976 and 1977	Cinderella	Georgina Hardup	London Palladium
1977–1978	George and Mildred	George Roper	UK Tour
1979	George and Mildred	George Roper	Australia and New Zealand Tour
1980	Shut Your Eyes and Think of England	Arthur Pullen	UK Tour
1981	Thark	Ronald Gamble	UK Tour
1981	The Soldier’s Fortune	Sir Davy Dunce	UK Tour
1981–1982	Dick Whittington	Idle Jack	Wimbledon Theatre, London
1982	Sweeney Todd: The Demon Barber of Fleet Street	Sweeney Todd	Forum Theatre, Billingham
1982–1983	On Your Way, Riley	Arthur Lucan; Old Mother Riley	Theatre Royal Stratford East; Queen's Theatre, London
1983	Birthday Suite	Tony	UK Tour
1983	Run for Your Wife	Stanley Gardner	Shaftesbury Theatre, London
1983	The Merchant of Venice	Shylock	Richmond Theatre
1983–1984	Dick Whittington		Theatre Royal, Brighton
1984	Peter Pan	Storyteller	Barbican Theatre, London
1985–1986	Dick Whittington		Chichester Festival Theatre
1986	When We Are Married	Herbert Soppitt	Whitehall Theatre, London
1987	Mixed Feelings		Cambridge Arts Theatre
1988	The Government Inspector	Ossip	UK Tour
1989	Roll on Friday	Jim	Watford Palace Theatre
1990	Spider's Web	Inspector Lord	UK Tour
1990–1991	Out of Order	The Waiter	Shaftesbury Theatre, London
1991	Wife Begins at Forty	George Harper	Devonshire Park Theatre, Eastbourne
1991–1993	The Invisible Man	Thomas Marvel	Theatre Royal Stratford East then UK Tours
1994	The Unexpected Guest	Inspector Thomas	Theatre Royal, Windsor
1995–1996	Mother Goose	Old Mother Riley	Horsham Arts Centre
1996	Cash on Delivery	Uncle George	Whitehall Theatre, London
1997–1998	The Government Inspector		Almeida Theatre, London
1999	The Ladykillers	The Major	UK Tour
2001	The Sunshine Boys	Al Lewis	UK Tour
2001	You’re Only Young Twice	Gordon "Brooksie" Brooks	UK Tour
2002	One for the Pot	Jugg	Theatre Royal, Windsor
2012	Goodwood Murder Mystery		Goodwood House

=== Radio ===
Year	Title	Role	Notes
1980	The Monday Play	Lion	Episode: "The Scatterbrained Scarecrow"
1986	Thirty-Minute Theatre	Mr. Smith	Episode: "Parent's Evening"
1987–1991	Citizens	Ernest Bond	Series regular
1995	Bomber	Unteroffizier Willi Reinecke	Drama based on the Len Deighton novel
1995	The Sunday Play	Police Sergeant	Episode: "The Death of Alexander Scriabin"
1996	Saturday Playhouse	George	Episode: "The Charge of the Boys' Brigade"
1999	The Ghost of Number Ten		Episode: "Survival of the Least Fittest"
1999	Saturday Playhouse	Dennis	Episode: "Lack of Moral Fibre"
2000	Do Go On	Ray	Episode: "Privacy"
2000	Afternoon Play	Bert	Episode: "Hold that Dream"
2000	Through the Looking Glass	White King	2 episodes
2008	The Brightonomicon	Quentin Vambury-Greystoke	Episode: "The Fantastic Adventure Of The Foredown Man"
2008	The Brightonomicon	Inspector Hector	Episode: "The Baffling Business Of The Bevendean Bat"
2019	Doctor Who: The Monthly Adventures	Robert Collins	Episode: "The Home Guard"
2023	Barmy Dale	Lord Palmer	2 episodes
