= Reno Gang =

Group of criminals during the American Civil War

- Founded: 1864
- Founded by: Frank Reno and John Reno
- Founding location: Seymour, Jackson County, Indiana, U.S.
- Years active: 1864-1868
- Territory: southern Indiana, Missouri, Iowa
- Ethnicity: European-American
- Membership (est.): 10-11
- Criminal activities: Bounty-jumping; murder; counterfeiting; robbery; train robbery

The Reno Gang, also known as the Reno Brothers Gang and The Jackson Thieves, were a group of criminals who operated in the Midwestern United States during and just after the American Civil War. Though short-lived, the gang carried out the first three peacetime train robberies in U.S. history. Most of the stolen money was never recovered.

The gang was broken up by the lynchings of ten of its members by vigilante mobs in 1868. The murders led to an international diplomatic incident with Canada and Great Britain, international newspaper coverage, and a general public uproar, though no one was ever identified or prosecuted for the lynchings.

The Reno Brothers have been portrayed in at least three films, including Elvis Presley's film debut in Love Me Tender (1956), in which he starred as Clint Reno, and Rage at Dawn (1955), featuring Randolph Scott.

== Family and early life ==
J. Wilkison (also known as Wilkinson or Wilkerson) Reno moved to Indiana in 1813 from the Salt River region of Kentucky, one of the Civil War border states. He married Julia Ann Freyhafer in 1835. Future gang members Franklin (Frank), John, Simeon (Sim), and William (Bill) Reno were born to the couple in Rockford, Jackson County, Indiana. There was also another son, Clinton ("Honest" Clint), and a daughter, Laura. In their early years, the siblings were raised in a strict Methodist farming household and were required to read the Bible all day on Sunday, according to John Reno's 1879 autobiography. Neither Clint nor Laura were involved in the gang's crime spree.

The rest of the brothers got into trouble early. John claimed that he and Frank bilked travellers in crooked card games. The Renos were also suspected when a series of mysterious fires broke out around Rockford over a period of seven years beginning in 1851. The community also suspected the brothers in the theft of a horse. The crimes caused considerable tension in the town, so Wilkison and four of his sons fled, living near St. Louis, Missouri, for some time, before returning to their farm in 1860. The American Civil War broke out shortly after, and the brothers enlisted in hopes of escaping the angry citizens of the town.

== Civil War ==
During the war, Frank, John, and possibly Simeon became bounty jumpers. They were paid to enlist in the Union Army, then failed to appear for duty. They continued to enlist under different names and in different locales, taking additional money. Federal records show that Frank, John, and Simeon all deserted. Many residents of southern Indiana were sympathetic to the Confederate States of America or were Northern Democrats wanting peace (known as "Copperheads"). It is not known if the Reno brothers were Copperheads or simply taking advantage of the situation. William briefly went AWOL but did return to serve out his enlistment. He was the only one who received an honorable discharge from the army. (There is a possibility that he was not a member of the gang.)

In 1864, Frank and John returned to Rockford, and a gang began to form under their leadership; Simeon and William joined them. Late that year, Frank and two other gang members, Grant Wilson and a man named Dixon, robbed the post office and Gilbert's Store in nearby Jonesville, Indiana. They were arrested but were released on bond. Wilson agreed to testify against his fellow robbers but was murdered before he could do so, and Frank was acquitted.

== Post-war crimes ==
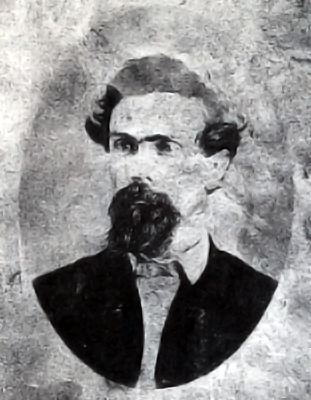
Frank Reno (1837–1868)

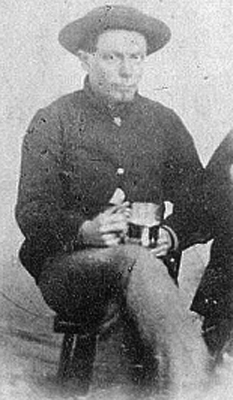
John Reno (1839–1895)

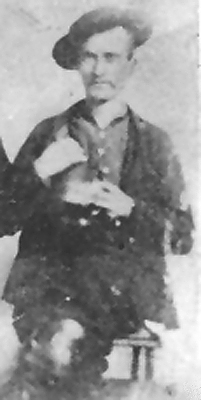
Frank Sparks

The Reno Gang was the first "Brotherhood of Outlaws" in the United States. They terrorized the Midwest for several years and inspired a host of other similar gangs who copied their crimes, leading to several decades of high-profile train robberies. Their gang attracted several new members after the end of the war. They started by robbing and murdering travellers in Jackson County and began to branch out to other counties, where they raided merchants and communities.

They planned to rob their first train near Seymour, Indiana, an important rail hub at that time. On the evening of October 6, 1866, John Reno, Sim Reno, and Frank Sparkes boarded an Ohio and Mississippi Railway train as it started to leave the Seymour depot. They broke into the express car, restrained the guard, and broke open a safe containing approximately $16,000. From the moving train, the three men pushed a larger safe over the side, where the rest of the gang was waiting. Unable to open the second safe, the gang fled as a large posse approached.

Later, passenger George Kinney stepped forward to identify two of the robbers. The three men were arrested, but were released on bail. When Kinney was shot and killed, the other passengers refused to testify and all charges had to be dropped. However, the robbery would ultimately lead to the gang's downfall. The contents of the safe were insured by the Adams Express Company, which hired the Pinkerton Detective Agency to track down and capture the gang.

On November 17, 1867, the Daviess County Courthouse in Gallatin, Missouri, was robbed. John Reno was identified, arrested by Pinkerton agents, and sentenced to 25 years in the Missouri State Penitentiary in 1868. He was released in February 1878. He returned to Seymour in 1886, but was again sent to prison for three years, this time for counterfeiting.

However, this did not deter the gang. Three robberies in Iowa followed in quick succession, in February and March 1868. Frank Reno and fellow gang members Albert Perkins and Miles Ogle were caught by Pinkertons led by Allan Pinkerton's son William, but broke out of jail on April 1. A second train robbery occurred in December 1867, when two members of the gang robbed another train leaving the Seymour depot. The robbers netted $8,000, which was turned over to the brothers. A third train, owned by the Ohio & Mississippi, was stopped by six members of the gang on July 10, though the Reno brothers were not involved. Waiting in ambush, however, were ten Pinkerton agents. A shootout ensued, and after several of the gang were wounded, the would-be robbers fled.

In March 1868, the residents of Seymour formed a vigilante group with the aim of killing the gang. In response, the gang fled west to Iowa where they robbed the Harrison County treasury of $14,000. The next day, they robbed the Mills County treasury of $12,000. The Pinkerton detectives quickly located the men and arrested them at Council Bluffs, Iowa. On April 1, the gang escaped from their Iowa jail and returned to Indiana.

The Reno Gang then robbed its fourth train on May 22. Twelve men boarded a Jeffersonville, Madison and Indianapolis Railroad train as it stopped at the train depot in Marshfield, Indiana, a now-defunct community in Scott County, Indiana. As the train pulled away, the gang overpowered the engineer and uncoupled the passenger cars, allowing the engine to speed away. After breaking into the express car and throwing express messenger Thomas Harkins off the train (causing fatal injuries), the gang broke open the safe, netting an estimated $96,000. This robbery gained national attention and was reported on in many major papers. The Pinkertons pursued, but the gang dispersed throughout the Midwest.

The gang attempted to rob another train on July 9. Pinkerton detectives had learned of the plan and ten agents were waiting aboard the train. When the gang broke in, the agents opened fire, wounding two of the gang. Everyone was able to escape except Volney Elliot, who identified the other members of the gang in exchange for leniency. Using this information, the detectives arrested two more members of the gang, Charlie Roseberry and Theodore Clifton, the next day in Rockport.

== Lynchings ==
All three men were taken by train to jail. However, on July 10, 1868, three miles outside Seymour, Indiana, the prisoners were taken off the train and hanged by the neck from a nearby tree by a group of masked men calling itself the Jackson County Vigilance Committee. Three other gang members, Henry Jerrell, Frank Sparks, and John Moore, were captured shortly after in Illinois and returned to Seymour. They were also hanged by vigilantes, from the same tree, at the site which became known as Hangman Crossing, Indiana.

On July 27, 1868, the Pinkertons captured William and Simeon Reno in Indianapolis. The men were jailed at the Scott County Jail in Lexington. They were tried and convicted of robbing the Marshfield train, but because of the threat of vigilantes, they were moved to the more secure Floyd County Jail. The day after their removal from Lexington, the vigilantes broke into the vacated jail, hoping to catch and lynch the men.

Frank Reno, the gang's leader, and Charlie Anderson were tracked down to the Canadian border town of Windsor, Ontario. With the help of United States Secretary of State William H. Seward, the men were extradited in October under the provisions of the 1842 Webster-Ashburton Treaty. Both men were sent to New Albany, Indiana to join the other prisoners.

On the night of December 11, about 65 hooded men travelled by train to New Albany. The men marched four abreast from the station to the Floyd County Jail where, just after midnight, they forced their way into the jail and the sheriff's home. After they beat the sheriff, Thomas Fullenlove, and shot him in the arm for refusing to turn over the keys, his wife surrendered them to the mob. Frank Reno was the first to be dragged from his cell to be lynched. He was followed by brothers William and Simeon. Another gang member, Charlie Anderson, was the fourth and last to be lynched, at around 4:30 AM on December 12. It was rumored that the vigilantes were part of the group known as the Scarlet Mask Society or Jackson County Vigilance Committee. No one was ever charged, named or officially investigated in any of the lynchings. Many local newspapers, such as the New Albany Weekly Ledger, stated that "Judge Lynch" had spoken. Reno Avenue in New Albany is likely named for the gang.

Frank Reno and Charlie Anderson were technically in federal custody when they were lynched. This is believed to be the only time in U.S. history that a federal prisoner had ever been lynched by a mob before a trial. Secretary of State William H. Seward wrote a formal letter of apology as a result. A new bill was later introduced into the U.S. Congress that clarified the responsibility for the safety of extradited prisoners.

The three Reno brothers are buried in the Seymour city cemetery. Treasure hunters have long searched for any trace of their rumoured hoard of loot, but nothing has been found.

Name	Age	Date of death	Location
Clifton, Theodore Freylinghuysen	24	July 20, 1868	Hangman Crossing, Indiana
Elliott, Thomas Volney (Val)	22	July 20, 1868	Hangman Crossing, Indiana
Roseberry, Charles W.	25	July 20, 1868	Hangman Crossing, Indiana
Jerrell, Henry	23	July 25, 1868	Hangman Crossing, Indiana
Moore, John J.	21	July 25, 1868	Hangman Crossing, Indiana
Sparks, Frank	27	July 25, 1868	Hangman Crossing, Indiana
Anderson, Charles	24	December 12, 1868	New Albany, Indiana
Reno, Frank	31	December 12, 1868	New Albany, Indiana
Reno, Simeon	25	December 12, 1868	New Albany, Indiana
Reno, William Harrison	20	December 12, 1868	New Albany, Indiana

== In popular culture ==
- Rage at Dawn is a 1955 Hollywood film based on the Reno brothers' story. It stars Randolph Scott as undercover detective James Barlow. Forrest Tucker, born in Plainfield, Indiana, played Frank Reno.
- Elvis Presley's first film was Love Me Tender (1956), where he starred (in his only historical film) as "Honest" Clint Reno.
- The Legend of the Reno Brothers, a 2013 documentary film directed by Anthony Susnick and starring Morgan Raque, was released to DVD on December 12, 2013.
- Season 14, Episode 4 (2024) of Expedition Unknown, "America's First Train Robbers" looks into the history and lost loot of the gang.
- The song "Ballad of a Well-Known Gun" on Elton John's 1970 album Tumbleweed Connection makes reference to the Pinkertons and Reno ("Now I know how Reno felt when he ran from the law.").
