= Art Napoleon (film director) =

American screenwriter and film director

Art Napoleon (1920–2003) was a film director and writer from New York City.

== Select credits ==
- The Sharkfighters (1956) – story
- Man on the Prowl (1957) – writer, director, producer
- Whirlybirds (1957–60) (TV series) – creator
- Too Much, Too Soon (1958) – writer, director
- The Last Frontier (1959) – writer, director of pilot for TV series for Fox
- Ride the Wild Surf (1964) – writer
- The Activist (1969) – writer, producer, director
