= Scottsburg, Indiana =

- City
- City of Scottsburg
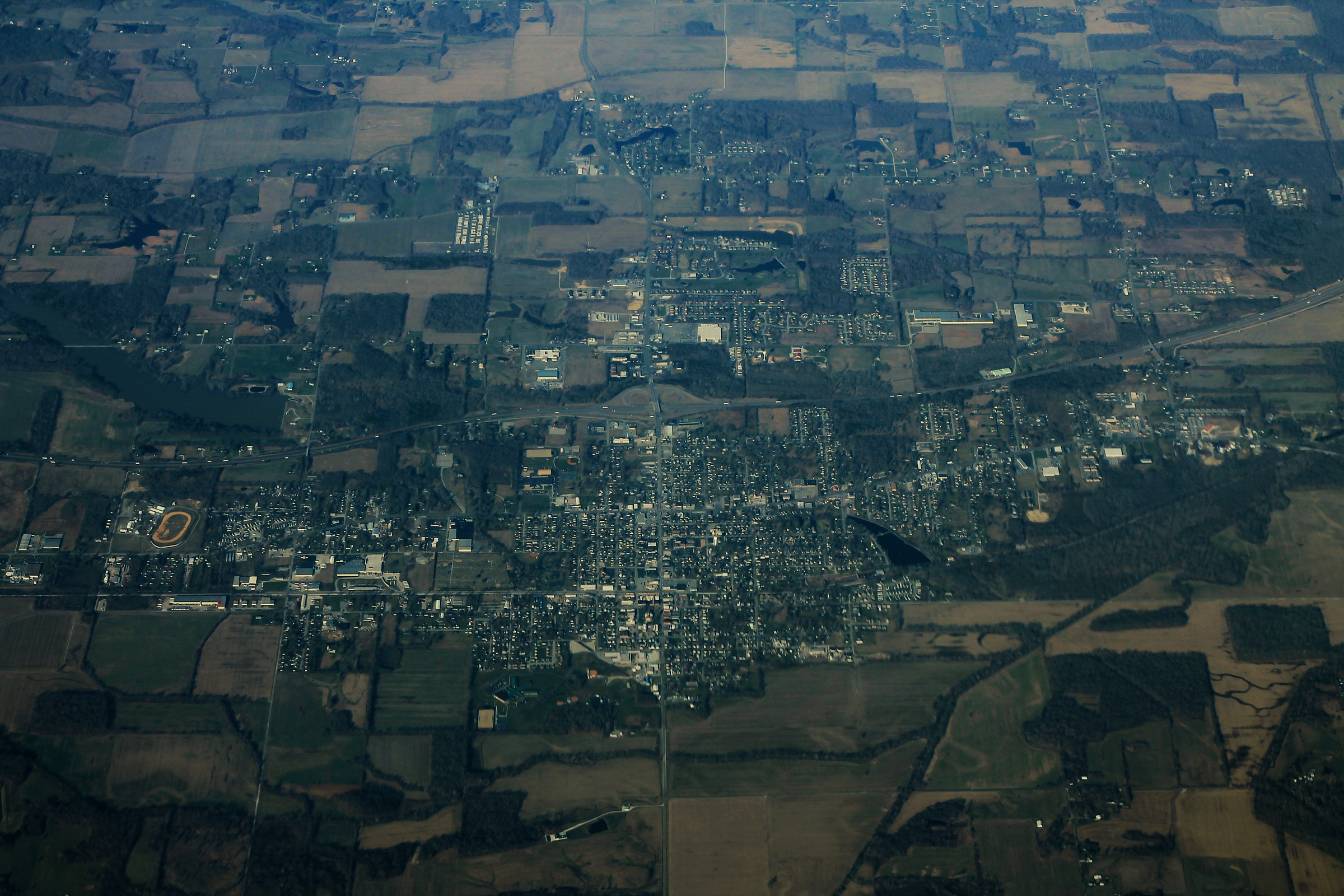
- Aerial view of Scottsburg

- Flag Logo

- Location of Scottsburg in Scott County, Indiana.
- Coordinates: 38°41′07″N 85°46′59″W
- Country: United States
- State: Indiana
- County: Scott
- Township: Vienna

Government
  - Mayor: Terry Amick (D)

Area
  - Total: 5.56 sq mi (14.41 km^{2})
  - Land: 5.54 sq mi (14.35 km^{2})
  - Water: 0.023 sq mi (0.06 km^{2}) 0.39%
- Elevation: 577 ft (176 m)

Population (2020)
  - Total: 7,345
  - Density: 1,325.9/sq mi (511.93/km^{2})
- Time zone: UTC-5 (EST)
  - Summer (DST): UTC-4 (EDT)
- ZIP code: 47170
- Area code: 812
- FIPS code: 18-68526
- GNIS feature ID: 2396560
- Website: www.cityofscottsburg.com

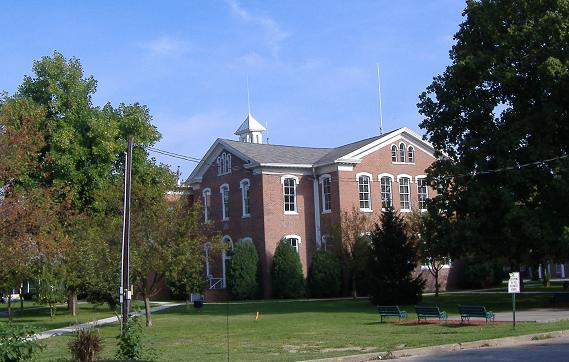
Courthouse Square

Scottsburg is a city within Vienna Township and the county seat of Scott County, in the U.S. state of Indiana, about 30 miles (48 km) north of Louisville, Kentucky. The population of Scottsburg was 7,345 at the 2020 census.

== History ==
Scottsburg was platted in 1871. The city was named for Horace Scott, a railroad official. A post office has been in operation at Scottsburg since 1873.

The Scott County Home, Scottsburg Courthouse Square Historic District, and Scottsburg Depot are listed on the National Register of Historic Places.

== Geography ==
According to the 2010 census, Scottsburg has a total area of 5.069 square miles (13.13 km^{2}), of which 5.05 square miles (13.08 km^{2}) (or 99.63%) is land and 0.019 square miles (0.05 km^{2}) (or 0.37%) is water.

=== Climate ===
The climate in this area is characterized by hot, humid summers and cold Midwest winters. According to the Köppen Climate Classification system, Scottsburg has a humid subtropical climate, abbreviated "Cfa" on climate maps.

Climate data for Scottsburg
Month	Jan	Feb	Mar	Apr	May	Jun	Jul	Aug	Sep	Oct	Nov	Dec	Year
Mean daily maximum °C (°F)	4 (39)	6 (43)	12 (54)	19 (66)	24 (75)	29 (84)	31 (88)	30 (86)	27 (81)	21 (70)	12 (54)	6 (43)	18 (64)
Daily mean °C (°F)	0 (32)	1 (34)	6 (43)	12 (54)	17 (63)	22 (72)	24 (75)	23 (73)	20 (68)	13 (55)	6 (43)	1 (34)	12 (54)
Mean daily minimum °C (°F)	−5 (23)	−4 (25)	0 (32)	5 (41)	11 (52)	16 (61)	18 (64)	17 (63)	13 (55)	6 (43)	0 (32)	−3 (27)	6 (43)
Average precipitation mm (inches)	90 (3.5)	72 (2.8)	111 (4.4)	104 (4.1)	107 (4.2)	106 (4.2)	102 (4.0)	95 (3.7)	75 (3.0)	72 (2.8)	83 (3.3)	83 (3.3)	1,098 (43.2)

== Demographics ==
Historical population
Census	Pop.	Note	%±
1880	454		—
1890	618		36.1%
1900	1,274		106.1%
1910	1,669		31.0%
1920	1,609		−3.6%
1930	1,702		5.8%
1940	2,189		28.6%
1950	2,953		34.9%
1960	3,810		29.0%
1970	4,791		25.7%
1980	5,068		5.8%
1990	5,334		5.2%
2000	6,040		13.2%
2010	6,747		11.7%
2020	7,345		8.9%
U.S. Decennial Census

In 2003 Scott County was removed from the Louisville-Jefferson County, KY-IN Metropolitan Statistical Area and became the Scottsburg, IN Micropolitan Statistical Area. It is part of the Louisville/Jefferson County–Elizabethtown–Bardstown, KY-IN Combined Statistical Area.

=== 2020 census ===
As of the 2020 census, Scottsburg had a population of 7,345. The median age was 38.0 years. 21.9% of residents were under the age of 18 and 18.5% of residents were 65 years of age or older. For every 100 females there were 88.2 males, and for every 100 females age 18 and over there were 86.1 males age 18 and over.

99.7% of residents lived in urban areas, while 0.3% lived in rural areas.

There were 3,100 households in Scottsburg, of which 28.6% had children under the age of 18 living in them. Of all households, 34.9% were married-couple households, 20.3% were households with a male householder and no spouse or partner present, and 34.0% were households with a female householder and no spouse or partner present. About 35.5% of all households were made up of individuals and 15.3% had someone living alone who was 65 years of age or older.

There were 3,409 housing units, of which 9.1% were vacant. The homeowner vacancy rate was 4.3% and the rental vacancy rate was 8.0%.

Racial composition as of the 2020 census
Race	Number	Percent
White	6,917	94.2%
Black or African American	37	0.5%
American Indian and Alaska Native	11	0.1%
Asian	37	0.5%
Native Hawaiian and Other Pacific Islander	4	0.1%
Some other race	63	0.9%
Two or more races	276	3.8%
Hispanic or Latino (of any race)	195	2.7%

=== 2010 census ===
As of the census of 2010, there were 6,747 people, 2,768 households, and 1,730 families living in the city. The population density was 1,336.0 inhabitants per square mile (515.8/km^{2}). There were 3,117 housing units at an average density of 617.2 per square mile (238.3/km^{2}). The racial makeup of the city was 97.2% White, 0.3% African American, 0.2% Native American, 0.9% Asian, 0.7% from other races, and 0.6% from two or more races. Hispanic or Latino of any race were 1.8% of the population.

There were 2,768 households, of which 32.6% had children under the age of 18 living with them, 40.6% were married couples living together, 16.1% had a female householder with no husband present, 5.8% had a male householder with no wife present, and 37.5% were non-families. 30.9% of all households were made up of individuals, and 12.4% had someone living alone who was 65 years of age or older. The average household size was 2.34 and the average family size was 2.90.

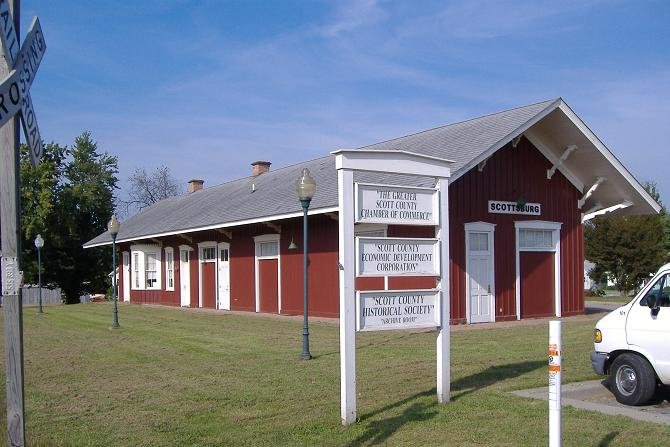
The Scottsburg Depot is listed on the National Register of Historic Places

The median age in the city was 37.5 years. 23.3% of residents were under the age of 18; 9.5% were between the ages of 18 and 24; 27% were from 25 to 44; 24.5% were from 45 to 64; and 15.9% were 65 years of age or older. The gender makeup of the city was 47.5% male and 52.5% female.

=== 2000 census ===
As of the census of 2000, there were 6,040 people, 2,539 households, and 1,604 families living in the city. The population density was 1,257.2 inhabitants per square mile (485.4/km^{2}). There were 2,823 housing units at an average density of 587.6 per square mile (226.9/km^{2}). The racial makeup of the city was 98.34% White, 0.07% African American, 0.28% Native American, 0.28% Asian, 0.26% from other races, and 0.76% from two or more races. Hispanic or Latino of any race were 0.88% of the population.

There were 2,539 households, out of which 30.6% had children under the age of 18 living with them, 44.5% were married couples living together, 14.1% had a female householder with no husband present, and 36.8% were non-families. 32.4% of all households were made up of individuals, and 13.6% had someone living alone who was 65 years of age or older. The average household size was 2.30 and the average family size was 2.87.

In the city, the population was spread out, with 24.2% under the age of 18, 10.9% from 18 to 24, 29.5% from 25 to 44, 20.3% from 45 to 64, and 15.1% who were 65 years of age or older. The median age was 35 years. For every 100 females, there were 90.4 males. For every 100 females age 18 and over, there were 85.2 males.

The median income for a household in the city was $30,687, and the median income for a family was $37,083. Males had a median income of $31,217 versus $21,321 for females. The per capita income for the city was $16,552. About 12.6% of families and 15.5% of the population were below the poverty line, including 19.7% of those under age 18 and 9.4% of those age 65 or over.

== Education ==
The town has a lending library, the Scott County Public Library. The town is in Scott County School District 2. This includes Johnson, Lexington, Scottsburg, and Vienna-Finley Elementary Schools, Scottsburg Middle School, and Scottsburg Senior High School. The elementary schools are kindergarten through fifth grade. Scottsburg Middle School is sixth grade through 8th grade. Scottsburg Senior High School is ninth through twelfth grade with opportunities for a hybrid learning environment through Scottsburg New Tech High School. There are also a variety of early education programs, such as OVO Head Start and Pre-School programs at local churches.

== Culture ==
Every year on the fourth weekend in August the Finley Township Volunteer Fire Department holds the Leota Country Frolic, a festival to celebrate the country heritage of the town founded in 1884. Live bluegrass music, antique farm machinery show, watermelon eating contest, arts and crafts, quilt raffle, flea market, pedal pull, euchre tournament, and an abundance of good food. This event is held in historic Leota, centered around the infamous covered bridge.

During the second weekend in August the Scottsburg Beautification Committee hosts the Pig Roast in the Park. This is a nonprofit event that raises funds for the city of Scottsburg. The event features food, live music, a slow-pitch softball tournament, and arts and crafts booths. The last day of the event concludes with a fireworks display.
