= Scottsburg station =

- Scottsburg Depot
- U.S. National Register of Historic Places
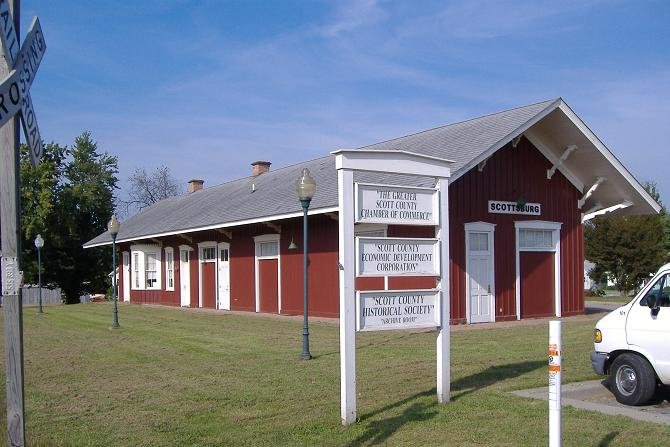

- Location within Indiana Location within the United States
- Location: 43 S. Railroad St., Scottsburg, Indiana
- Coordinates: 38°41′7″N 85°46′17″W
- Area: less than one acre
- Built: 1872
- Architectural style: Stick/eastlake
- NRHP reference No.: 91001162
- Added to NRHP: August 29, 1991

Scottsburg is a historic railroad depot located at Scottsburg, Indiana. It was built in 1872 by the Jeffersonville, Madison and Indianapolis Railroad, costing almost $1,492 (equivalent to $40,098 in 2025). It is a one-story, Stick Style frame building with board and batten siding and a projecting agent's window. Its presence influenced the location of Scottsburg in 1874, as the town was named for the railroad's General Superintendent, Horace Scott. It was built specifically for both passenger and freight cargo. Inside there was separate waiting rooms for men and women. Passenger service to the station ended in the 1950s. It is one of the last structures of its kind still standing in Indiana.

It was placed on the National Register of Historic Places in 1991 as the Scottsburg Depot, but was moved one block north to its present location to help preserve it. With federal transportation funds, it was restored. In 1996 it became the Scottsburg Heritage Station.

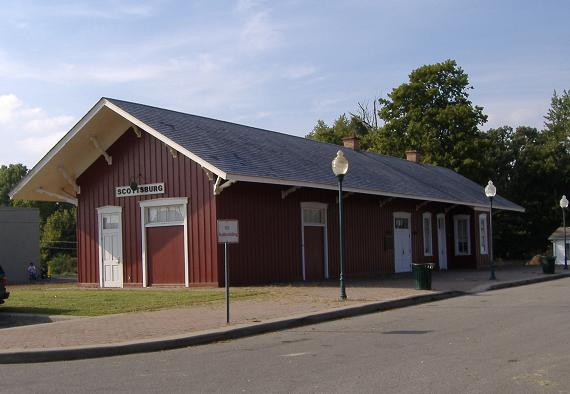
Southeast view of depot

Preceding station	Pennsylvania Railroad	Following station
Austin toward Chicago	Chicago – Louisville	Underwood toward Louisville
