= 29th Academy Awards =

- Date: March 27, 1957
- Site: RKO Pantages Theatre; Hollywood, California; NBC Century Theatre; New York City, New York
- Hosted by: Jerry Lewis (Hollywood); Celeste Holm (New York City)
- Produced by: Valentine Davies
- Directed by: Bill Bennington; Max Miller

Highlights
- Best Picture: Around the World in 80 Days
- Most awards: Around the World in 80 Days and The King and I (5)
- Most nominations: Giant (10)

TV in the United States
- Network: NBC

The 29th Academy Awards were held on March 27, 1957, to honor the films of 1956.

In this year, Best International Feature Film became a competitive category, having been given as a Special Achievement Award since 1947. The first competitive winner was Italy, for Federico Fellini's La Strada, which received a further nomination for Best Original Screenplay.

This was the first year (and last until 1967) in which all Best Picture nominees were in color, and all were large-scale epics: The King and I, Giant, The Ten Commandments (the highest-grossing film of the year), Friendly Persuasion, and the winner, Around the World in 80 Days. This established a trend toward blockbusters and colorful spectaculars in the category, with The Bridge on the River Kwai, Gigi, and Ben-Hur following as Best Picture winners.

The Best Original Story category was noteworthy this year for several reasons. The winner, Robert Rich (for The Brave One) was in fact a pseudonym of Dalton Trumbo, who was blacklisted at the time and thus unable to receive credit under his own name. Edward Bernds and Elwood Ullman withdrew their names from consideration for their work on High Society, as the nomination had been intended for the musical starring Grace Kelly, while Bernds and Ullman had instead written a Bowery Boys film of the same name the year before. The nomination was a double mistake, as High Society (1956) was based on the play and film The Philadelphia Story and did not qualify as an original story.

James Dean became the only actor to receive a second posthumous nomination for acting. Ingrid Bergman was not present to collect her award for Best Actress: Cary Grant accepted on her behalf. Bergman, who was doing a play in Paris, praised her own victory, saying that the Oscar is "the most wished-for award by all movie artists because it comes from your co-workers". She later listed the nominees for Best Director via the same pre-recorded segment, while the winner was announced by host Jerry Lewis.

Director John Ford's classic western The Searchers, widely seen as one of the best American films of all time, failed to receive a single nomination.

This was the second time since the introduction of the Supporting Actor and Actress awards that Best Picture, Best Director, and all four acting Oscars were given to different films. This would not happen again until the 78th Academy Awards. Around the World in 80 Days became the sixth film to win Best Picture without any acting nominations and the most recent to win Best Picture without winning Best Director or any acting nominations. It was also the last film to win Best Picture without winning Best Director or any of the acting categories until Chariots of Fire in 1981.

Stephen Bosustow became the only producer in Academy history to receive every nomination in a category (Short Subjects-Cartoons).

== Winners and nominees ==
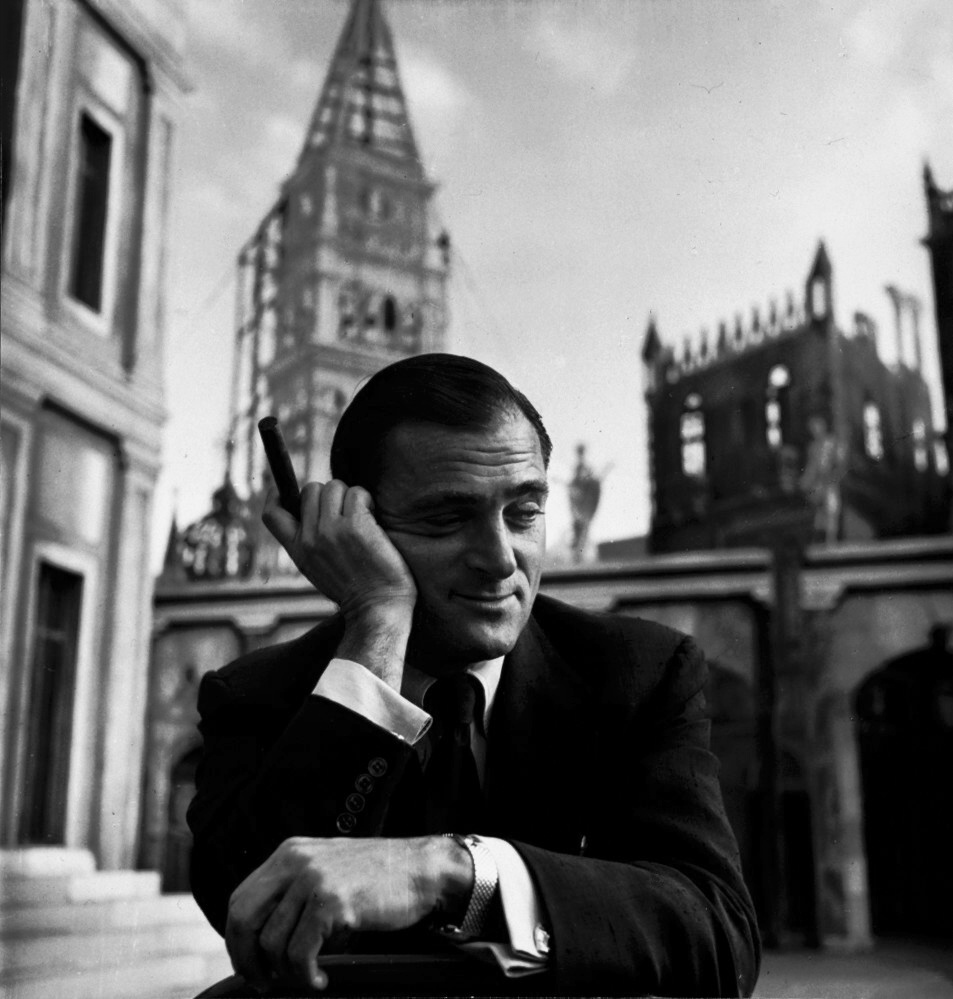
Mike Todd; Best Picture winner

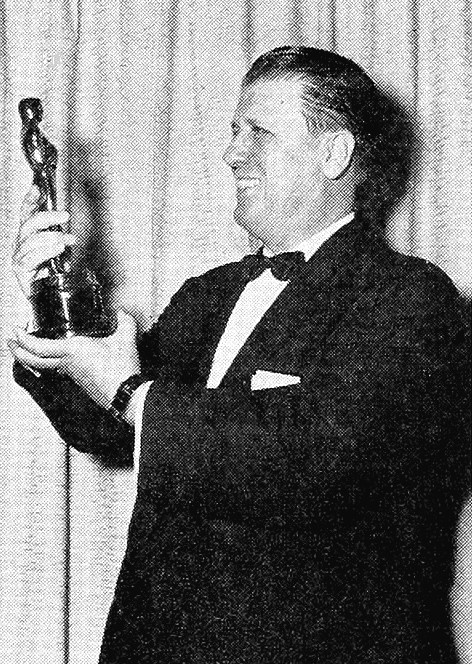
George Stevens; Best Director winner

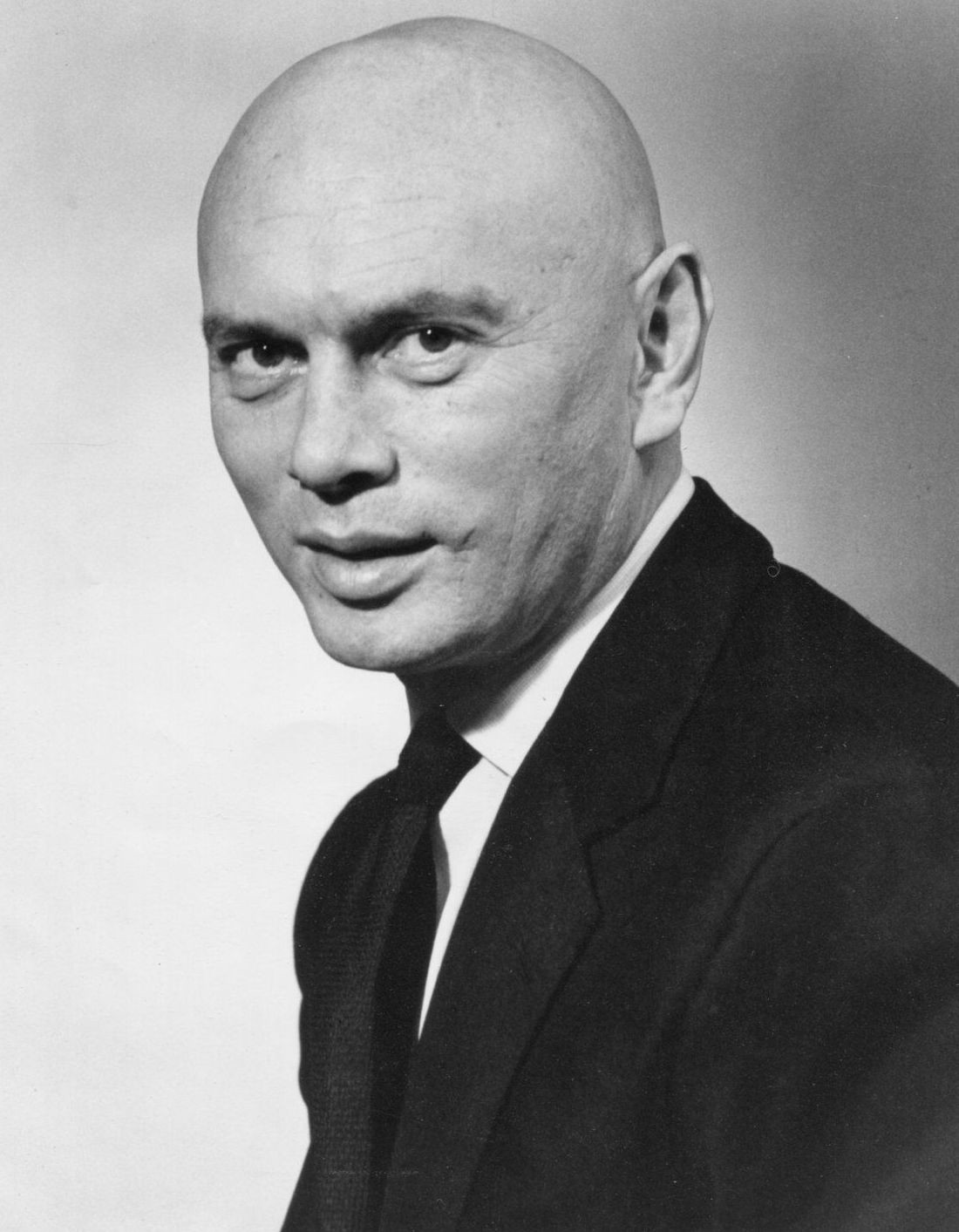
Yul Brynner; Best Actor winner

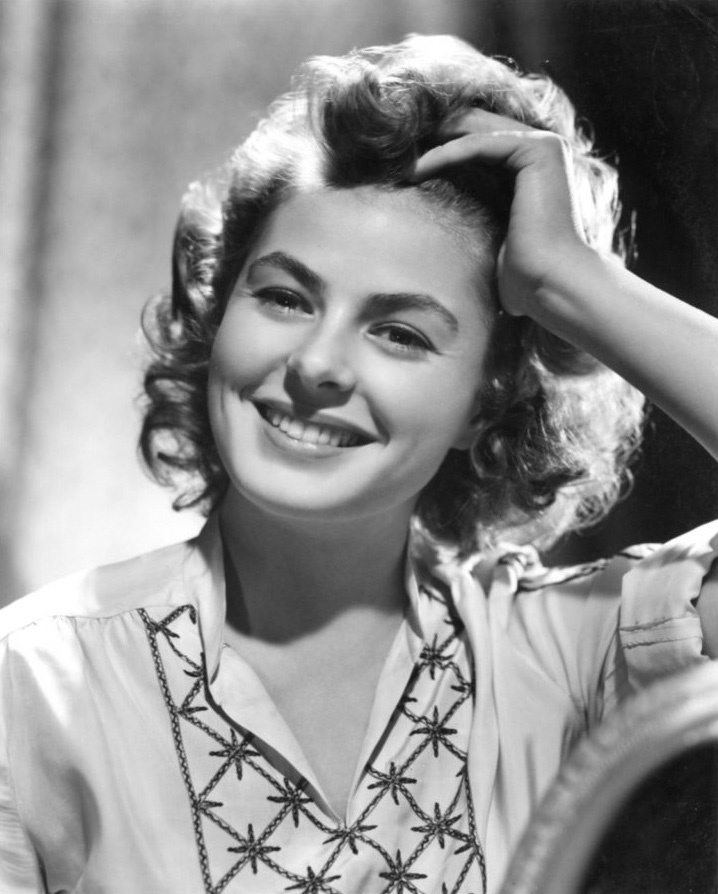
Ingrid Bergman; Best Actress winner

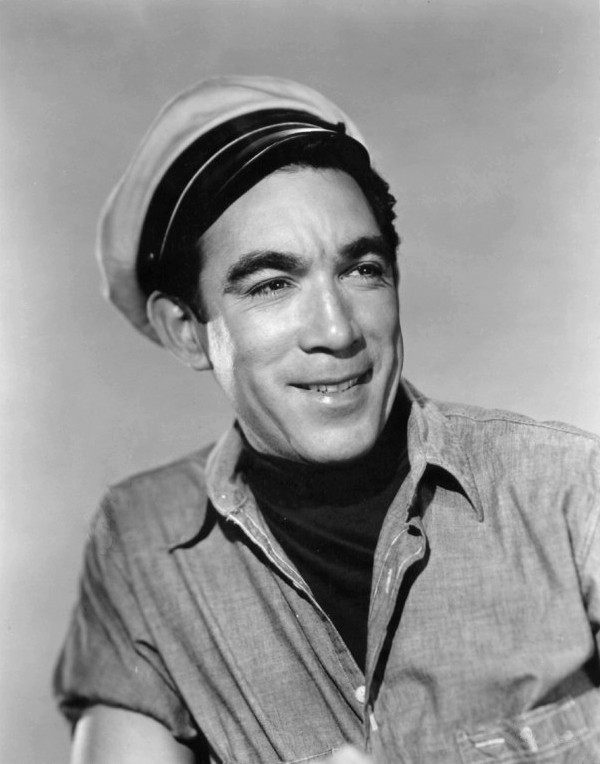
Anthony Quinn; Best Supporting Actor winner

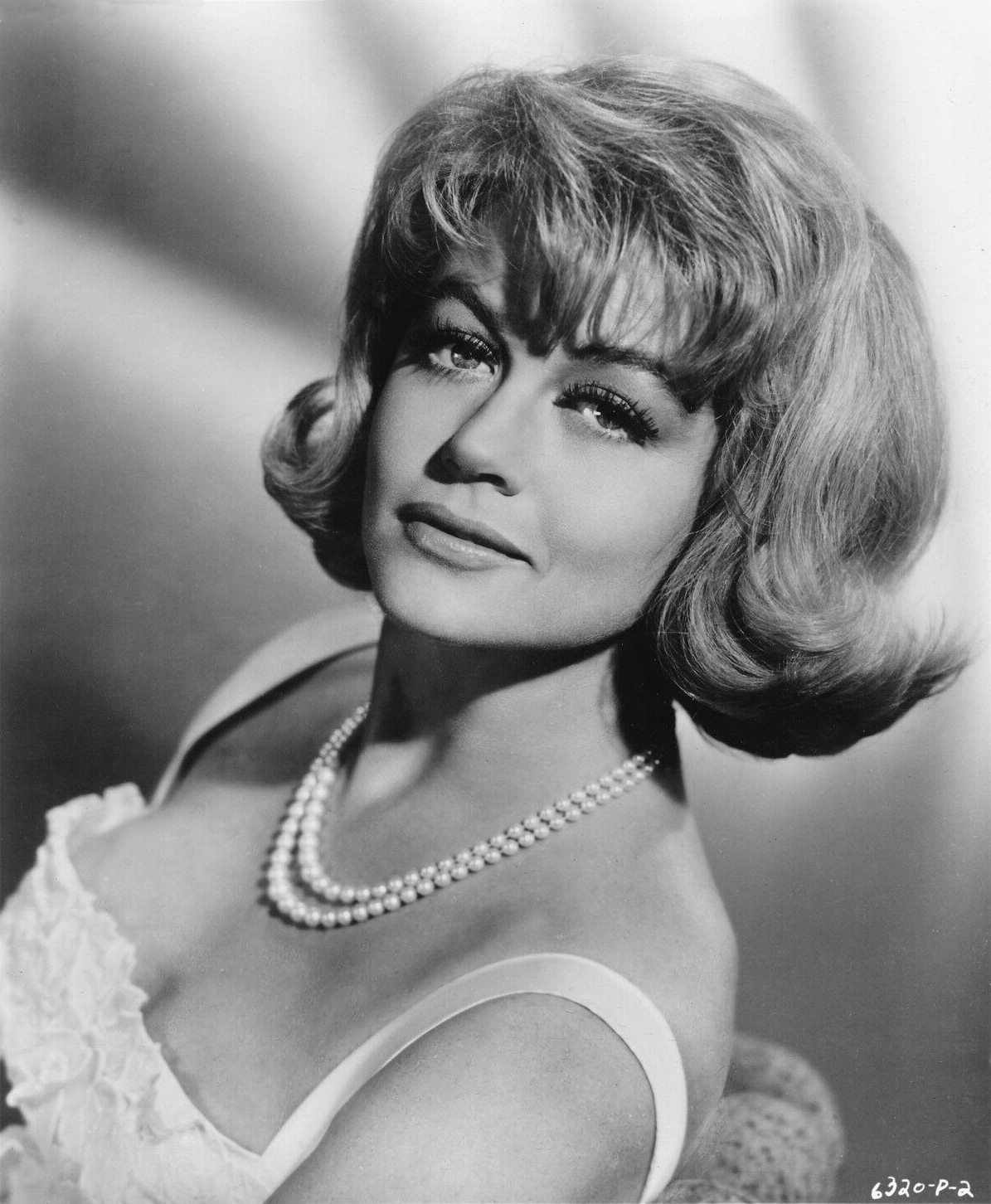
Dorothy Malone; Best Supporting Actress winner

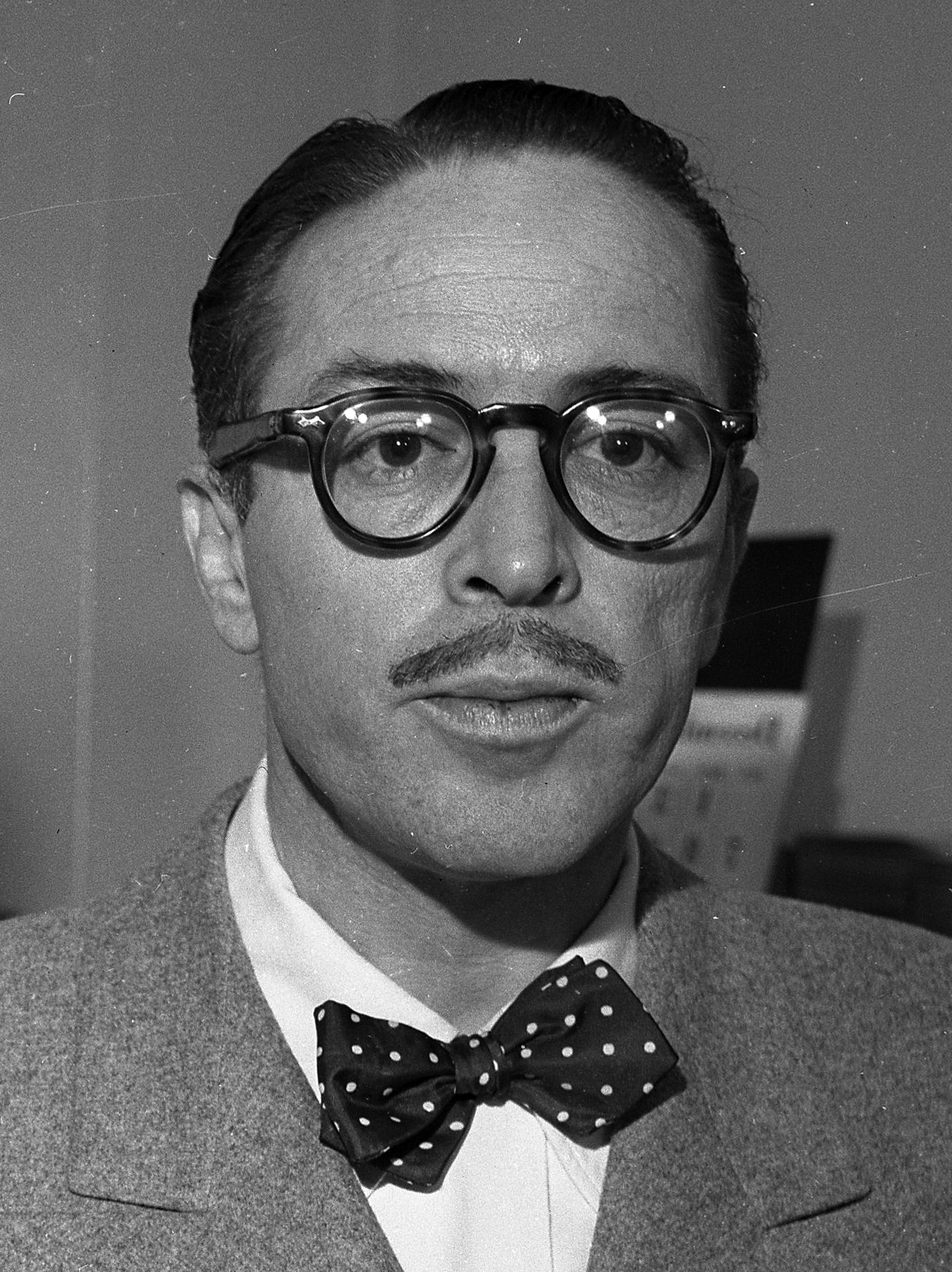
Dalton Trumbo; Best Story winner

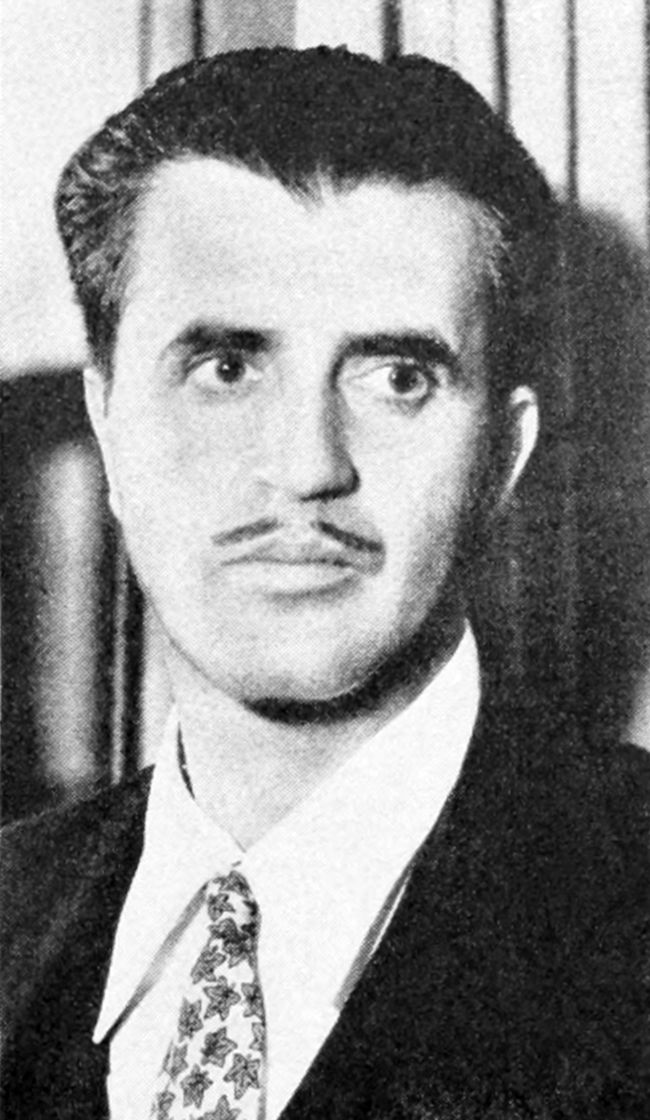
Cedric Gibbons; Best Art Direction, Black-and-White co-winner

=== Awards ===
Nominees were announced on February 18, 1957. Winners are listed first and highlighted in boldface.

**Best Motion Picture**: **Around the World in 80 Days – Mike Todd, producer**; Friendly Persuasion – William Wyler, producer; Giant – George Stevens and Henry Ginsberg, producers; The King and I – Charles Brackett, producer; The Ten Commandments – Cecil B. DeMille, producer	**Best Directing**: **George Stevens – Giant**; Michael Anderson – Around the World in 80 Days; William Wyler – Friendly Persuasion; Walter Lang – The King and I; King Vidor – War and Peace
**Best Actor**: **Yul Brynner – The King and I as King Mongkut of Siam**; James Dean (posthumous nomination) – Giant as Jett Rink; Kirk Douglas – Lust for Life as Vincent van Gogh; Rock Hudson – Giant as Jordan "Bick" Benedict Jr.; Laurence Olivier – Richard III as Richard	**Best Actress**: **Ingrid Bergman – Anastasia as Anna Koreff**; Carroll Baker – Baby Doll as Baby Doll Meighan; Katharine Hepburn – The Rainmaker as Lizzie Curry; Nancy Kelly – The Bad Seed as Christine Penmark; Deborah Kerr – The King and I as Anna Leonowens
**Best Actor in a Supporting Role**: **Anthony Quinn – Lust for Life as Paul Gauguin**; Don Murray – Bus Stop as Beauregard Decker; Anthony Perkins – Friendly Persuasion as Josh Birdwell; Mickey Rooney – The Bold and the Brave as Dooley; Robert Stack – Written on the Wind as Kyle Hadley	**Best Actress in a Supporting Role**: **Dorothy Malone – Written on the Wind as Marylee Hadley**; Mildred Dunnock – Baby Doll as Aunt Rose Comfort; Eileen Heckart – The Bad Seed as Hortense Daigle; Mercedes McCambridge – Giant as Luz Benedict; Patty McCormack – The Bad Seed as Rhoda Penmark
**Best Writing (Motion Picture Story)**: **The Brave One – Dalton Trumbo**; The Eddy Duchin Story – Leo Katcher; The Proud and the Beautiful – Jean-Paul Sartre; Umberto D. – Cesare Zavattini; ~~High Society – Edward Bernds and Elwood Ullman~~ (nomination revoked)	**Best Writing (Screenplay -- Original)**: **The Red Balloon – Albert Lamorisse**; The Bold and the Brave – Robert Lewin; Julie – Andrew L. Stone; The Ladykillers – William Rose; La Strada – Federico Fellini and Tullio Pinelli
**Best Writing (Screenplay -- Adapted)**: **Around the World in 80 Days – James Poe, John Farrow and S. J. Perelman based on the novel by Jules Verne**; Baby Doll – Tennessee Williams based on his short plays Twenty-seven Wagons Full of Cotton and The Unsatisfactory Supper; Friendly Persuasion – Michael Wilson based on the novel by Jessamyn West; Giant – Ivan Moffat and Fred Guiol based on the novel by Edna Ferber; Lust for Life – Norman Corwin based on the novel by Irving Stone	**Best Foreign Language Film**: **La Strada (Italy) – Dino De Laurentiis and Carlo Ponti, producers**; The Captain of Kopenick (West Germany) – Gyula Trebitsch and Walter Koppel, producers; Gervaise (France) – Annie Dorfmann, producer; Harp of Burma (Japan) – Masayuki Takagi, producer; Qivitoq (Denmark) – O. Dalsgaard-Olsen, producer
**Best Documentary (Feature)**: **The Silent World – Jacques-Yves Cousteau**; The Naked Eye – Louis Clyde Stoumen; Where Mountains Float – The Government Film Committee of Denmark	**Best Documentary (Short Subject)**: **The True Story of the Civil War – Louis Clyde Stoumen**; A City Decides – Charles Guggenheim & Associates, Inc.; The Dark Wave – John Healy; The House Without a Name – Valentine Davies; Man in Space – Ward Kimball
**Best Short Subject (One-Reel)**: **Crashing the Water Barrier – Konstantin Kalser**; I Never Forget a Face – Robert Youngson; Time Stood Still – Cedric Francis	**Best Short Subject (Two-Reel)**: **The Bespoke Overcoat – Romulus Films**; Cow Dog – Larry Lansburgh; The Dark Wave – John Healy; Samoa – Walt Disney
**Best Short Subject (Cartoon)**: **Magoo's Puddle Jumper – Stephen Bosustow**; Gerald McBoing-Boing on Planet Moo – Stephen Bosustow; The Jay Walker – Stephen Bosustow	**Best Music (Music Score of a Dramatic or Comedy Picture)**: **Around the World in 80 Days – Victor Young (posthumous award)**; Anastasia – Alfred Newman; Between Heaven and Hell – Hugo Friedhofer; Giant – Dimitri Tiomkin; The Rainmaker – Alex North
**Best Music (Scoring of a Musical Picture)**: **The King and I – Alfred Newman and Ken Darby**; The Best Things in Life Are Free – Lionel Newman; The Eddy Duchin Story – Morris Stoloff and George Duning; High Society – Johnny Green and Saul Chaplin; Meet Me in Las Vegas – Georgie Stoll and Johnny Green	**Best Music (Song)**: **"Que Sera, Sera (Whatever Will Be, Will Be)" from The Man Who Knew Too Much – Music and Lyrics by Jay Livingston and Ray Evans**; "Friendly Persuasion (Thee I Love)" from Friendly Persuasion – Music by Dimitri Tiomkin; Lyrics by Paul Francis Webster; "Julie" from Julie – Music by Leith Stevens; Lyrics by Tom Adair; "True Love" from High Society – Music and Lyrics by Cole Porter; "Written on the Wind" from Written on the Wind – Music by Victor Young (posthumous nomination); Lyrics by Sammy Cahn
**Best Sound Recording**: **The King and I – Carlton W. Faulkner**; The Brave One – Buddy Myers; The Eddy Duchin Story – John P. Livadary; Friendly Persuasion – Gordon R. Glennan and Gordon E. Sawyer; The Ten Commandments – Loren L. Ryder	**Best Art Direction (Black-and-White)**: **Somebody Up There Likes Me – Art Direction: Cedric Gibbons and Malcolm Brown; Set Decoration: Edwin B. Willis and F. Keogh Gleason**; The Proud and Profane – Art Direction: Hal Pereira and A. Earl Hedrick; Set Decoration: Samuel M. Comer and Frank R. McKelvy; Seven Samurai – Art Direction and Set Decoration: So Matsuyama; The Solid Gold Cadillac – Art Direction: Ross Bellah; Set Decoration: William Kiernan and Louis Diage; Teenage Rebel – Art Direction: Lyle R. Wheeler and Jack Martin Smith; Set Decoration: Walter M. Scott and Stuart A. Reiss
**Best Art Direction (Color)**: **The King and I – Art Direction: Lyle R. Wheeler and John DeCuir; Set Decoration: Walter M. Scott and Paul S. Fox**; Around the World in 80 Days – Art Direction: James W. Sullivan and Ken Adam; Set Decoration: Ross Dowd; Giant – Art Direction: Boris Leven; Set Decoration: Ralph S. Hurst; Lust for Life – Art Direction: Cedric Gibbons, Hans Peters and E. Preston Ames; Set Decoration: Edwin B. Willis and F. Keogh Gleason; The Ten Commandments – Art Direction: Hal Pereira, Walter H. Tyler and Albert Nozaki; Set Decoration: Samuel M. Comer and Ray Moyer	**Best Cinematography (Black-and-White)**: **Somebody Up There Likes Me – Joseph Ruttenberg**; Baby Doll – Boris Kaufman; The Bad Seed – Harold Rosson; The Harder They Fall – Burnett Guffey; Stagecoach to Fury – Walter Strenge
**Best Cinematography (Color)**: **Around the World in 80 Days – Lionel Lindon**; The Eddy Duchin Story – Harry Stradling; The King and I – Leon Shamroy; The Ten Commandments – Loyal Griggs; War and Peace – Jack Cardiff	**Best Costume Design (Black-and-White)**: **The Solid Gold Cadillac – Jean Louis**; The Power and the Prize – Helen Rose; The Proud and Profane – Edith Head; Seven Samurai – Kohei Ezaki; Teenage Rebel – Charles LeMaire and Mary Wills
**Best Costume Design (Color)**: **The King and I – Irene Sharaff**; Around the World in 80 Days – Miles White; Giant – Moss Mabry and Marjorie Best; The Ten Commandments – Edith Head, Ralph Jester, John Jensen, Dorothy Jeakins and Arnold Friberg; War and Peace – Maria De Matteis	**Best Film Editing**: **Around the World in 80 Days – Gene Ruggiero and Paul Weatherwax**; The Brave One – Merrill G. White; Giant – William Hornbeck, Philip W. Anderson and Fred Bohanan; Somebody Up There Likes Me – Albert Akst; The Ten Commandments – Anne Bauchens
**Best Special Effects**: **The Ten Commandments – John P. Fulton**; Forbidden Planet – A. Arnold Gillespie, Irving G. Ries and Wesley C. Miller

=== Honorary Award ===
- To Eddie Cantor for distinguished service to the film industry.

=== Jean Hersholt Humanitarian Award ===
- Y. Frank Freeman

=== Irving G. Thalberg Memorial Award ===
- Buddy Adler

== Presenters and performers ==
=== Presenters ===
- Carroll Baker (Presenter: Best Original Song)
- Ingrid Bergman (Presenter: Best Director)
- Ernest Borgnine (Presenter: Best Actress)
- Gower Champion and Marge Champion (Presenters: Art Direction Awards)
- Dorothy Dandridge (Presenter: Best Visual Effects)
- Kirk Douglas (Presenter: Best Film Editing)
- Janet Gaynor (Presenter: Best Motion Picture)
- Rock Hudson and Eva Marie Saint (Presenters: Best Musical Score and Best Dramatic or Comedy Score)
- Nancy Kelly (Presenter: Best Supporting Actor)
- Deborah Kerr (Presenter: Writing Awards)
- Jack Lemmon (Presenter: Best Supporting Actress)
- Anna Magnani (Presenter: Best Actor)
- Dorothy Malone (Presenter: Best Sound Recording)
- Mercedes McCambridge and Robert Stack (Presenters: Documentary Awards)
- Patty McCormack and Mickey Rooney (Presenters: Short Subject Awards)
- George Seaton (Presenter: Best Foreign Language Film, Honorary Award, the Irving G. Thalberg Award and the Jean Hersholt Humanitarian Award)
- Elizabeth Taylor (Presenter: Costume Design Awards)
- Claire Trevor (Presenter: Cinematography Awards)

=== Performers ===
- Johnny Green – Conductor the Academy Awards orchestra
- Bing Crosby ("True Love" from High Society)
- Dorothy Dandridge ("Julie" from Julie)
- The Four Aces ("Written on the Wind" from Written on the Wind)
- Gogi Grant ("Que Sera, Sera (Whatever Will Be, Will Be)" from The Man Who Knew Too Much)
- Tommy Sands ("Friendly Persuasion (Thee I Love)" from Friendly Persuasion)

== Multiple nominations and awards ==
Films with multiple nominations
Nominations	Film
10	Giant
9	The King and I
8	Around the World in 80 Days
7	The Ten Commandments
6	Friendly Persuasion
4	Baby Doll
4	The Bad Seed
4	The Eddy Duchin Story
4	Lust for Life
3	The Brave One
3	Somebody Up There Likes Me
3	War and Peace
3	Written on the Wind
2	Anastasia
2	The Bold and the Brave
2	The Dark Wave
2	High Society
2	Julie
2	La Strada
2	The Proud and Profane
2	The Rainmaker
2	Seven Samurai
2	The Solid Gold Cadillac
2	Teenage Rebel

Films with multiple awards
Awards	Film
5	Around the World in 80 Days
5	The King and I
2	Somebody Up There Likes Me

== See also ==
- 14th Golden Globe Awards
- 1956 in film
- 8th Primetime Emmy Awards
- 9th Primetime Emmy Awards
- 10th British Academy Film Awards
- 11th Tony Awards
