= Friendly Persuasion =

Friendly Persuasion may refer to:

- The Friendly Persuasion, a 1945 novel by Jessamyn West
  - Friendly Persuasion (1956 film), based on the book
    - "Friendly Persuasion" (song), a popular song from the movie
  - Friendly Persuasion (1975 film), a made-for-TV movie based on the book and its sequel
