= List of submissions to the 29th Academy Awards for Best Foreign Language Film =

1956 Best Foreign Language Film submissions

Highlights
- Oscar winner: (Italy) La Strada
- Submissions: 8
- Debuts: all

This is a list of submissions to the 29th Academy Awards for Best Foreign Language Film. The Academy Award for Best Foreign Language Film was created in 1956 by the Academy of Motion Picture Arts and Sciences (AMPAS) to honour non-English-speaking films produced outside the United States. That year, AMPAS asked individual countries to submit their best films of the year for the inaugural Best Foreign Language Film category. In previous years, the Foreign Language Oscar had not been a regular award, and there were no nominees – a winner was simply announced at the Oscar ceremony.

The award has since been handed out annually, and countries are invited by the Academy to submit their best films for competition according to strict rules, with only one film being accepted from each country.

For the 29th Academy Awards only, the nominations were credited both to the submitting country and to the films' producers; in all later years, only the country has been credited as the nominee, rather than a producer or director. Eight films were submitted in the category Academy Award for Best Foreign Language Film, and five of these were selected as Oscar nominees: Denmark, France, West Germany, Italy and Japan.

Italy was the inaugural winner with La Strada by Federico Fellini, which was also nominated for Best Writing, Best Original Screenplay.

== Submissions ==
Submitting country	Film title used in nomination	Original title	Language(s)	Producer(s)	Director(s)	Result
Denmark	Qivitoq	Qivitoq - Fjeldgængeren	Danish, Greenlandic	O. Dalsgaard-Olsen	Erik Balling	Nominated
France	Gervaise		French	Annie Dorfmann	René Clément	Nominated
West Germany	The Captain of Köpenick	Der Hauptmann von Köpenick	German	Gyula Trebitsch, Walter Koppel	Helmut Käutner	Nominated
Italy	La Strada		Italian	Dino De Laurentiis, Carlo Ponti	Federico Fellini	Won Academy Award
Japan	The Burmese Harp	ビルマの竪琴	Japanese, English, Burmese	Masayuki Takagi	Kon Ichikawa	Nominated
Philippines	Child of Sorrow	Anak dalita	Tagalog, Filipino, English		Lamberto V. Avellana	Not nominated
Spain	Afternoon of the Bulls	Tarde de toros	Spanish		Ladislao Vajda	Not nominated
Sweden	The Staffan Stolle Story	Ratataa	Swedish		Hasse Ekman	Not nominated

== Sources ==
- Margaret Herrick Library, Academy of Motion Picture Arts and Sciences
