= Kalser =

Kalser is a surname. Notable people with the surname include:

- Erwin Kalser (1883–1958), German actor
- Konstantin Kalser (1920–1994), American film producer
