= Naked eye (disambiguation) =

Naked eye is a figure of speech referring to visual perception.

Naked eye may also refer to:

- Naked Eye (magazine), a Canadian pop culture quarterly
- "Naked Eye" (Luscious Jackson song), 1996
- "Naked Eye" (The Who song), 1974
- The Naked Eye (1956 film), a 1956 documentary film nominated for an Academy Award
- The Naked Eye (1998 film), a 1998 Spanish film
- The Naked Eye, a book by Desmond Morris

== See also ==
- Naked Eyes, an English new wave duo
- Naked-eye planet
