= Moune de Rivel =

French singer and songwriter (1918– 2014)

- Born: Cécile Aimée Henriette Jean-Louis; 7 January 1918; Bordeaux
- Died: 27 March 2014 (aged 96); 19th arrondissement of Paris
- Resting place: Montparnasse Cemetery
- Occupation: Actor, musician, singer-songwriter
- Parent(s): Henri Jean-Louis Baghio'o; Fernande De Virel
- Relatives: Jean-Louis Baghio'o
- Awards: Knight of the National Order of Merit (1966); Chevalier des Arts et des Lettres (1997); Officer of the National Order of Merit (1994)

Cécile Jean-Louis (7 January 1918 – 27 March 2014), better known by her stage name Moune de Rivel, was a French singer-songwriter, musician and actress.

== Biography ==
Moune de Rivel was born in Bordeaux to Guadeloupean parents: her father was Henri Jean-Louis Baghio'o, a French magistrate, and her mother was Fernande de Virel, daughter of the Count of Virel and musician. She had two brothers, Edward and Victor.

She chose "Moune de Rivel" as her stage name by reversing her mother's surname.

Moune de Rivel died in 2014 in Paris and is buried at the Montparnasse Cemetery.

== Filmography ==
Year	Title	Role	Director	Notes
1948	To the Eyes of Memory	La chanteuse du night-club	Jean Delannoy	
1952	Three Women	Zora (segment "Boitelle")	André Michel	
1967	Meurtre en sourdine	Klemir	Gilbert Pineau	TV movie
1968	Spray of the Days		Charles Belmont	Adaptation of the 1947 novel Froth on the Daydream by Boris Vian
1970	Mont-Cinère	Joséphine	Jean-Paul Roux	TV movie
1971	The Butterfly Affair	Sister Marie-Galante	Jean Herman	
1972	L'Atlantide	Rosita	Jean Kerchbron	TV movie. Adaptation of the 1919 novel Atlantida by Pierre Benoit
1974	Paul et Virginie	Marie	Pierre Gaspard-Huit	TV series. Adaptation of the 1788 novel Paul et Virginie by Jacques-Henri Bernardin de Saint-Pierre
1978	L'argent des autres	La chanteuse antillaise	Christian de Chalonge	
1988	Cinéma	Mathurine	Philippe Lefebvre	Miniseries

== Bibliography ==
- Kiroa. Eugène Dervain (illustrator). Paris: Présence africaine. 1960. p. 36. OCLC 3698803.

== Honors and awards ==
- Knight of the National Order of Merit (France) (1966)
- Officer of the National Order of Merit (France) 1994
- Chevalier of the Ordre des Arts et des Lettres (2004)
