= West Home =

Historic house in California, United States

- U.S. National Register of Historic Places
- Location within California Location within the United States
- Location: 4791 Palm Ave., Yorba Linda, California
- Coordinates: 33°53′25″N 117°47′54″W
- NRHP reference No.: 81000722
- Added to NRHP: March 4, 1981

West Home is a historic building in Yorba Linda, California. It was the home of Jessamyn West during her childhood. It was listed on the National Register of Historic Places in 1981.
