= Three Women (1952 film) =

1952 film

- Directed by: André Michel
- Written by: Claude Accursi; Jean Ferry
- Produced by: Robert Dorfmann; Pierre Lévy
- Starring: Marcelle Arnold
- Cinematography: Henri Alekan; André Bac; Maurice Barry
- Edited by: Victoria Mercanton
- Music by: Louis Beydts; Georges Van Parys
- Production company: Coopérative Générale du Cinéma Français; Silver Films
- Distributed by: Les Films Corona
- Release date: 25 June 1952
- Running time: 104 minutes
- Country: France
- Language: French

Three Women (French: Trois femmes) is a 1952 French comedy film directed by André Michel. It was entered into the 1952 Cannes Film Festival.

== Plot ==
The films consists of three segments which were adapted from three short stories by Guy de Maupassant each centered on a woman. The titles and respective lead actors of the segments are:

- Boitelle with Moune de Rivel as the female lead character Zora, and Jacques Duby as the title character.
- Mouche with Catherine Erard as the title character, and Marcelle Arnold, Jacques Fabbri, Pierre Olaf, Raymond Pellegrin, Marcel Mouloudji
- L'Héritage with Agnès Delahaie as Coralie, and René Lefèvre, Michel Bouquet, Pierre Palau, Bernard Noël, Jean Ozenne, Jean Mercure

== Cast ==
- Marcelle Arnold
- Michel Bouquet as M. Lesable (segment "L'Héritage")
- Betty Daussmond
- Agnès Delahaie as Coralie Cachelin (segment "L'Héritage")
- Blanche Denège
- Moune de Rivel (fr) as Zora (segment "Boitelle")
- Jacques Duby as Antoine Boitelle
- Jacqueline Duc
- Catherine Erard as Mouche (segment "Mouche")
- Jacques Fabbri as Albert (segment "Mouche")
- Florelle
- Jacques François as Horace (segment "Mouche")
- René Lefèvre as M. Cachelin (segment "L'Héritage")
- Marcel Lupovici
- Marcel Mouloudji
- Bernard Noël as M. Maze (segment "L'Héritage")
- Pierre Olaf as P'tit bleu (segment "Mouche")
- Palau as M. Torcheboeuf (segment "L'Héritage")
- Raymond Pellegrin as Julien (segment "Mouche")
- Germaine Stainval
- Rosy Varte
- Yvonne Yma
