= Agnès Delahaie =

French actress and film producer

Agnès Delahaie (17 September 1920 – 8 December 2003), also known as Annie Dorfmann, was a French actress and film producer and the wife of Robert Dorfmann. She was nominated (as Annie Dorfmann) for Best Foreign Language Film at the 29th Academy Awards for producing Gervaise (1956).

Delahaie died in Paris in December 2003 at the age of 83.

== Filmography ==
Actress

- Justice Is Done (1950)
- Three Women (1952)

Producer

- Gervaise (credited as Annie Dorfmann) (1956)
- Young Girls Beware (1957)
- One Life (credited as Annie Dorfmann) (1958)
- Pickpocket (1959)
- The Trial of Joan of Arc (1962)
- The Second Twin (1966)
