= Crashing the Water Barrier =

1956 film

- Directed by: Konstantin Kalser
- Written by: Reuven Frank
- Produced by: Konstantin Kalser
- Starring: Knox Manning; Donald Campbell
- Cinematography: Henry Javorsky
- Edited by: Kenneth Baldwin
- Distributed by: Warner Bros.
- Release date: April 15, 1956
- Running time: 9 minutes
- Country: United States
- Language: English

Crashing the Water Barrier is a 1956 American short documentary film directed by Konstantin Kalser. It won an Oscar at the 29th Academy Awards in 1957 for Best Short Subject (One-Reel). It focuses on Donald Campbell's 1955 effort to break a water speed record on Lake Mead in Nevada, US.

In 1966, Kalser admitted that Crashing the Water Barrier was produced by Marathon Petroleum as an advertisement.

== Cast ==
- Knox Manning as Narrator
- Donald Campbell as Speedboat racer
- Sir Malcolm Campbell as Auto racer (archive footage) (uncredited)
- Narration: Jay Jackson
