= Jean-Louis Baghio'o =

Martiniquais writer

Victor Jean-Louis (21 December 1910 – 20 December 1994), known by the pen-name Jean-Louis Baghio'o, was a French engineer and writer. He was born on 21 December 1910 at Fort-de-France (Martinique) and died in Paris on December 20, 1994. Victor Jean-Louis's father, Henri Jean-Louis (born in 1874 in Guadeloupe, where he died in 1958), had already used the same pen-name, Jean-Louis Baghio'o.

== Life ==
The son of Henri Jean-Louis (called Baghio'o, author of La Bible africaine and the first Black magistrate in the French West Indies) and of Fernande de Virel, a gifted violinist, Victor Jean-Louis was sent to France for his studies along with his older brother Edward, as early as 1923. Having graduated from the Institut électrotechnique of Grenoble in 1930, the young engineer went to Egypt to participate in the construction of hydroelectric dams before redirecting his career towards sound-recording for the radio and the cinema.

Between 1939 and 1945 he was an officer in the French Army. Captured by the Germans he managed to flee to Switzerland before joining the Résistance with Robert Desnos, Léon-Gontran Damas and Marguerite Duras and participating, as the technical assistant in Pierre Schaeffer's Studio d'Essai, in the "liberation of the waves" in Paris.

After the war he was nominated technical director of the Overseas Broadcasting Service with the French Radio Broadcasting (Radio-diffusion française). In this capacity Jean-Louis Baghio'o protested violently against the racism of some of his colleagues and against what he called "la coloniaiserie" (a pun combining the words "colonialism" and "stupidity"). He also began writing his first literary texts and published the tale of Issandre le mulâtre. From 1951 to 1954 he returned, for the first time since his departure in 1923, to the Antilles to stay with his ailing father. During this period he settled with his wife and five children at Gourbeyre in Guadeloupe. There he taught mathematics at the Collège technique Saint-Jean-Bosco on the slopes of the Soufrière volcano. He also gave literary form to his rediscovery of the West Indies in a publication gathering some of his father's and some of his own poems (Les Jeux du soleil) and in sketches of what was going to become his masterpiece, the novel Le Flamboyant à fleurs bleues (The Blue Flame-Tree), a lusty saga of the O'Os of Guadeloupe and a ferocious satire of colonialism, crowned with the literary award Prix des Caraïbes.

Back in France, the sound-engineer was entrusted by the French Broadcasting Company (ORTF) with the construction and management of several radio stations in Africa, in the difficult context of decolonization. There too retracing his father's itinerary (who had long been a French judge in Africa), he conceived the autobiographic novel and "two-voiced memoir", Le Colibri blanc, in which telepathy serves as a means of communication between protagonists spread out between France, the Caribbean and Africa.

After his retirement from the ORTF, Jean-Louis Baghio'o devoted even more time to the work of an homme de lettres. He became a tireless student of languages (various Creoles, Italian, Spanish) and of literatures, earning an M.A. degree from the Université de Vincennes in 1981 with a thesis on the poetry of Césaire and of Saint-John Perse. As a member of the Prix des Caraïbes jury, he was delighted to read the production of the young generation of Caribbean writers, while also maintaining a passionate interest in literary theory and history.

Jean-Louis Baghio'o died of a stroke in Paris on 20 December 1994, the day before his 84th birthday, a few hours only after his daily morning walk at the Parc de Vincennes and after his daily translation of a page from Don Quixotte. He had also just finished correcting the proofs of his last novel, Choutoumounou, a sequel to Le Flamboyant à fleurs bleues and a colorful evocation of the "Paris antillais" of the 1920s and 1930s.

If there is a unifying element in Jean-Louis Baghio'o's work it is the permanent exaltation communicated by an author whose style leaned towards the baroque. To him, the real – in the West Indies or elsewhere – was never dull but marvelous. In that he felt akin to Alejo Carpentier, whose novel El Siglo de las luces (The Century of the Enlightenment) he admired deeply.

It might be noted that Victor Jean-Louis's sister, Cécile Jean-Louis, born in Bordeaux in 1918, knew a great career as a creole singer under the name Moune de Rivel (fr), mostly appearing at La Canne à sucre, an Antillean club in Paris, between 1945 and 1996. She was also the only woman included in the famous picture gathering the participants in the "First Congress of Black Writers and Artists" at the Paris Sorbonne in 1956.

== Works ==
=== Novels ===
- Issandre le mulâtre, Preface by Catherine Dunham, Paris, Editions Fasquelle, 1949 (175 p.)
- Le Flamboyant à fleurs bleues, Paris, Calmann-Lévy, 1973, (Prix des Caraïbes 1975). Paris, Editions Caribéennes, preface by Maryse Condé, 1981, 232 p.
- Le Colibri blanc, Paris, Editions Caribéennes, 1981, 308 p.
- Choutoumounou, Preface by Mireille Sacotte, Paris, L'Harmattan (Lettres des Caraïbes), 1995, 316 p.

=== Essays ===
- L'Ingénieur du son dans le cinéma, la radio-diffusion et à la télévision, Paris, Editions Chiron, 1949.
- La Dialectique radio-télévision en Afrique, Paris, Editions Ocora, 1963.
- "Hommage à Léon-Gontran Damas", Paris, Présence Africaine, 1979.
- "Deux poèmes, deux poètes: une lecture sémantique du Cahier d'un retour au Pays Natal d'Aimé Césaire et de Pour fêter une enfance de Saint-John Perse", M.A. Thesis (unpublished), Université Vincennes-Paris VIII, 1981.

=== Poetry ===
- Chant des Iles (divertissement poétique mis en musique par H. Tomasi), Paris, Radio-diffusion francaise, 1945.
- Les Jeux du soleil, Paris, Editions Coop Arts Graphiques, 1960.

=== Translated work ===
- The Blue Flame-Tree, translated by Stephen Romer, Manchester, Carcanet Press, 1990.
