= Randi Michelsen =

Danish actress (1903–1981)

- Born: 20 February 1903; Copenhagen, Denmark
- Died: 12 August 1981 (aged 78); Denmark
- Resting place: Cemetery of Holmen
- Occupation: Actress
- Years active: 1927-1974

Randi Michelsen (20 February 1903 – 12 August 1981) was a Danish film actress. She appeared in 35 films between 1927 and 1974. She was born in Copenhagen, Denmark and died in Denmark.

== Selected filmography ==
- Københavnere (1933)
- Tyrannens fald (1942)
- Hr. Petit (1948)
- Mosekongen (1950)
- Vejrhanen (1952)
- Min datter Nelly (1955)
- Qivitoq (1956)
