= Gervaise (film) =

- Theatrical release poster
- Directed by: René Clément
- Screenplay by: Jean Aurenche; Pierre Bost
- Based on: L'Assommoir by Émile Zola
- Produced by: Agnès Delahaie
- Starring: Maria Schell; François Périer; Jany Holt
- Cinematography: Robert Juillard
- Edited by: Henri Rust
- Music by: Georges Auric
- Color process: Black and white
- Production companies: Agnes Delahaie Productions; Silver Film; Compagnie Industrielle et Commerciale Cinématographique
- Distributed by: Les Films Corona
- Release date: 5 September 1956
- Running time: 117 minutes
- Country: France
- Language: French

Gervaise (French pronunciation: [ʒɛʁ.vɛz]) is a 1956 French historical drama film directed by René Clément based on the 1877 novel L'Assommoir by Émile Zola. It depicts a working-class woman in the mid-nineteenth century (played by Maria Schell) trying to cope with the descent of her husband (played by François Périer) into alcoholism.

The film was nominated for the Best Foreign Language Film at the 29th Academy Awards. Schell won the Volpi Cup for Best Actress at the 1956 Venice Film Festival for her performance; Périer won the 1957 BAFTA Best Actor for his performance; and the film itself won the 1957 BAFTA Best Film award.

== Plot ==
Paris, from 1852 onward. The story follows the struggles of Gervaise, a forsaken washerwoman left alone with her young sons Étienne and Claude by her lover Lantier. She marries Coupeau, a skilled roofer whose life takes a downward spiral due to an accident, leading to idleness, alcoholism, and illness. Together, they have a daughter named Nana. Despite Gervaise's courage and the support of her friend, the blacksmith Goujet, she finds herself unable to prevent Coupeau's decline, as he destroys the laundry business that was her livelihood. Virginie, driven by old grudges and the social challenges of the time, adds to Gervaise's troubles, pushing her further into alcoholism. Meanwhile, their daughter Nana is left to fend for herself on the unforgiving streets of Paris.

== Cast ==
- Maria Schell: Gervaise Macquart Coupeau, a patient and courageous laundrywoman
- François Périer: Coupeau, Gervaise's husband, a roofer
- Suzy Delair: Virginie Poisson, an old rival who hates Gervaise
- Armand Mestral: Lantier, Gervaise's former lover
- Jany Holt: Mme Lorilleux, Coupeau's ill-tempered sister
- Mathilde Casadesus: Mme Boche, the concierge
- Florelle: Maman Coupeau, Coupeau's aged mother
- Micheline Luccioni: Clémence, a laundrywoman who works with Gervaise
- Lucien Hubert: Monsieur Poisson, a policeman and Virginie's husband
- Jacques Harden: Goujet, a smith, a friend of Coupeau and Gervaise's
- Jacques Hilling: Monsieur Boche, the concierge's husband
- Hélène Tossy: Mme Bijard
- Amédée: Mes Bottes, Coupeau's drinking buddy
- Hubert de Lapparent (as Hubert Lapparent): Monsieur Lorilleux, a chainmaker, Mme Lorilleux' long-suffering husband
- Rachel Devirys: Mme Fauconnier
- Jacqueline Morane: Mme Gaudron
- Yvonne Claudie: Mme Putois
- Georges Paulais: Father Bru
- Gérard Darrieu: Charles, laundry worker
- Pierre Duverger: Monsieur Gaudron
- Marcelle Féry: Laundry owner
- Denise Péronne: a laundrywoman
- Simone Duhart: a fishmonger
- André Wasley: Father Colombe
- Ariane Lancell: Adèle
- Aram Stéphan: the mayor
- Georges Peignot: Monsieur Madinier
- Max Elbèze: Zidore
- Jean Relet: Sergent de ville (policeman)
- Roger Dalphin: worker
- Armand Lurville: presiding officer at hearing
- Jean Gautrat: Bec Salé
- Christian Denhez: Étienne, Gervaise and Lantier's younger son, at the age of 8
- Christian Férez: Étienne at the age of 13
- Patrice Catineaud: Claude, Gervaise and Lantier's elder son, at the age of 6
- Chantal Gozzi: Nana, Gervaise and Coupeau's daughter, at the age of 5
- Michèle Caillaud: Lalie
- Gilbert Sanjakian: the Boches' son at the age of 6
- Yvette Cuvelier: Augustine, apprentice at the laundry, at the age of 13
- Paul Préboist: member of the audience at the cabaret
- Jacques Bertrand: factory foreman

== Reception ==
Gervaise has an approval rating of 80% on review aggregator website Rotten Tomatoes, based on 5 reviews, and an average rating of 7.5/10.

== See also ==
- L'Assommoir
- List of submissions to the 29th Academy Awards for Best Foreign Language Film
- List of French submissions for the Academy Award for Best Foreign Language Film
