= Friendly Persuasion (1975 film) =

1975 television film directed by Joseph Sargent

- Genre: Drama
- Based on: The Friendly Persuasion by Jessamyn West
- Written by: William P. Wood
- Directed by: Joseph Sargent
- Starring: Richard Kiley; Shirley Knight
- Music by: John Cacavas
- Country of origin: United States
- Original language: English

Production
- Executive producers: Herbert B. Leonard; Emanuel L. Wolf
- Producer: Joseph Sargent
- Production location: Jackson, Missouri
- Cinematography: Mario Tosi
- Editors: Ed Forsyth; George Jay Nicholson
- Running time: 100 minutes
- Production companies: Allied Artists Pictures; International Television Productions

Original release
- Network: ABC
- Release: May 18, 1975

Friendly Persuasion is a made-for-TV movie. The film is based on the novels The Friendly Persuasion and Except for Me and Thee by Jessamyn West; the former novel had previously been adapted in 1956. It originally aired on ABC on May 18, 1975.

This version is different from the 1956 version, because it focuses mainly on West's sequel novel, Except for Me and Thee. There was an idea to make a TV series, with this being the pilot; but Friendly Persuasion did not gain as large an audience as ABC had hoped. The film is not available on VHS or LaserDisc, and there are no plans for a DVD release.

== Plot summary ==
In Civil War–era America, a Quaker family, Jess and Eliza Birdwell, helps slaves who have run away, knowing that they could die.

== Cast ==
Source: Hollywood.com; BFI

- Richard Kiley as Jess Birdwell
- Shirley Knight as Eliza Birdwell
- Clifton James as Sam Jordan
- Michael O'Keefe as Josh Birdwell
- Kevin O'Keefe as Labe Birdwell
- Tracie Savage as Mattie Birdwell
- Sparky Marcus as Little Jess Birdwell
- Paul Benjamin as Swan Stebeney
- Erik Holland as Enoch
- Maria Grimm as Lily Truscott
- Bob Minor as Burk
