= Black Fox: The Rise and Fall of Adolf Hitler =

1962 film

- DVD cover
- Directed by: Louis Clyde Stoumen
- Written by: Louis Clyde Stoumen; Johann Wolfgang Goethe
- Produced by: Louis Clyde Stoumen; Don Devlin
- Narrated by: Marlene Dietrich
- Edited by: Kenn Collins; Richard Kaplan; Mark Wortreich
- Music by: Ezra Laderman
- Distributed by: Capri Films; Metro-Goldwyn-Mayer
- Release date: 1962
- Running time: 89 minutes
- Country: United States
- Language: English

Black Fox: The Rise and Fall of Adolf Hitler is a 1962 documentary directed by Louis Clyde Stoumen.

== Summary ==
Depicting through archival footage and photographs the rise and fall of Nazi Germany, using The Story of Reynard the Fox, Johann Wolfgang von Goethe's 1794 version of Reynard the Fox, as a parallel.

== Release ==
Black Fox was originally scheduled to be released by Astor Pictures. After Astor's bankruptcy, Black Fox was released by the newly-formed Capri Films.

== Accolades ==
It won the Academy Award for Best Documentary Feature in 1962.

== See also ==
- List of American films of 1962
- Le Roman de Renard - Ladislas Starevich's 1930 puppet-animated feature film version of Goethe's tale
