= Eugene Vale =

American novelist

Eugene Vale (11 April 1916 – 2 May 1997) was a best-selling American novelist. He was also a screenwriter, a playwright, and the author of an influential volume on screenwriting.

== Biography ==
Vale was born in Switzerland, but worked in Paris during the 1930s. He moved to the United States after the outbreak of World War II. Vale worked in Hollywood and also as a lecturer on film and television writing at the University of Southern California. In Joseph McBride's biography of Frank Capra, Vale is quoted as saying that he wrote much of Capra's 1971 autobiography The Name Above the Title ("I'm responsible for the book").

In 1997, Vale died at home in Los Angeles at age 81.

== Works ==
=== Screenplays ===
Vale's screenplays included The Second Face (1950), Francis of Assisi (1961) and A Global Affair (1964). His 1956 short documentary, "The Dark Wave", was nominated for an Academy Award.

As well as writing screenplays, Vale in 1944 wrote a textbook, "The Technique of Screen & Television Writing". In this book, Vale provided many rules for writing screenplays, including that the "primary purpose of every film scene is to transition into the future".

=== Novels ===
Vale's debut novel, The 13th Apostle (pub. 1959) was reviewed favorably in The New York Times. The reviewer said in part "Mr. Vale is the only contemporary novelist of recent years, to my knowledge, who has made so ambitious an attempt to encompass in a single fabric every clue to modern man's devious retreat from engagement.

The novel immediately following, Chaos Below Heaven (pub. 1966), was also a best seller.

=== Plays and television ===
Vale's play "Devils Galore" was produced on Broadway in 1945. He also wrote for several early television shows, including Four Star Playhouse, The 20th Century Fox Hour, and Schlitz Playhouse of Stars.
