= Konstantin Kalser =

American film producer (1920–1994)

- Kalser accepting the Oscar for Crashing the Water Barrier, 1957
- Born: 4 September 1920; Munich, Germany
- Died: 30 July 1994 (aged 73); Amagansett, New York, US
- Citizenship: Germany; United States (after 1937)
- Occupations: Film producer; advertising executive
- Notable work: Crashing the Water Barrier (1956)
- Awards: Academy Award for Best Live Action Short Film (1957)

Konstantin Kalser (4 September 1920 – 30 July 1994) was a German-American film producer and advertising executive. He won the Academy Award for Best Live Action Short Film (then entitled "Best Short Subject, One-reel") in 1957 with Crashing the Water Barrier.

== Early life ==
Kalser was born in Munich on 4 September 1920, the son of actor Erwin Kalser and actress and screenwriter Irma von Cube. He was educated in Switzerland and at the University of California, Los Angeles. Kalser moved to the United States in 1937 to join his mother in the entertainment industry. During World War II, he served in the United States Air Force; post-war, he became a photographer for Life magazine.

== Career ==
In 1948, Kalser founded the film production company Marathon International Productions. At Marathon, Kalser produced some of the first newsreels intended for television and filmed the 1948 Winter Olympics for DuMont Television Network, the first to be broadcast on American television. Marathon evolved over the course of the 1950s and 1960s from a newsreel company to an advertising company; Kalser posited it as a "documentary company" and himself as a documentarian, claiming the advertisement aspect of his films was subtle enough to not impugn on their artistic value.

Kalser produced several short films through Marathon during the 1950s and 1960s, the most prominent of which was the Oscar-winning Crashing the Water Barrier. Crashing the Water Barrier was a one-reeler documentary on British speedboat racer Donald Campbell's successful effort to break a speed record. The film won Best Short Subject, One-reel at the 1957 Academy Awards; the next year, the one- and two-reel awards (the latter held that year by The Bespoke Overcoat) would be merged into a single short film award. In 1966, Kalser admitted that Crashing the Water Barrier was produced by Marathon as an advertisement for an oil company.

After the success of Crashing the Water Barrier, Kalser continued to produce short native advertising films. In 1966, he produced The Way of a Ship, a documentary on international freight transport logistics, for Volkswagen; the film focused on 64 ships that delivered Volkswagen cars. Kalser hoped the film would win another Academy Award. He additionally produced the Emmy-nominated For Years to Come for Chrysler. Kalser and Marathon would also produce non-advertisement works, such as The Unknown War, a syndicated docuseries on the Eastern Front conflict between the Axis powers and the Soviet Union during World War II.

== Personal life and death ==
In 1957, Kalser was arrested and fined for speeding 40 miles (64 km) per hour in a 35 miles (56 km) per hour zone in New York. After paying the fine, he showed the judge a film he had produced not long before where his wife was driving the same speed; other cars were speeding past, with some pausing to berate her for driving too slowly. According to the Associated Press, "the judge complimented Kalser on his ingenuity".

Kalser died of kidney failure at the age of 73 on 30 July 1994. He was survived by his wife, Martha Kalser, two children, and two stepchildren. At the time, he was living in Amagansett, New York.
