= The House Without a Name =

1956 film

- Directed by: Joe Parker
- Written by: Valentine Davies
- Produced by: Valentine Davies
- Starring: Raymond Burr; Marilyn Hare
- Distributed by: Universal Pictures
- Release date: 1956
- Country: United States
- Language: English

The House Without a Name is a 1956 short documentary film written and produced by Valentine Davies for the Motion Picture Relief Fund about its Motion Picture Hospital. It was nominated for an Academy Award for Best Documentary Short.

== See also ==
- List of American films of 1956
