= The Dark Wave =

1956 film

- Directed by: Jean Negulesco
- Written by: Eugene Vale
- Produced by: John Healy
- Cinematography: Charles G. Clarke
- Distributed by: Twentieth Century-Fox Film Corporation
- Release date: June 1956
- Running time: 23 minutes
- Country: United States
- Language: English

The Dark Wave is a 1956 American short documentary film directed by Jean Negulesco about a young girl with severe epilepsy. The short stars Charles Bickford and features Nancy Davis, the actress who would later become First Lady of the United States Nancy Reagan. It was made in cooperation with the Variety Club Foundation to Combat Epilepsy (a predecessor of the Epilepsy Foundation), who received the profits.

The Dark Wave was nominated for two Academy Awards, one for Best Documentary Short and the other for Best Two-Reel Short.

== Cast ==
- Charles Bickford
- Nancy Davis
- Cornell Borchers

== See also ==
- List of American films of 1956
