= Buddy Myers =

American sound engineer (1906–1967)

- Born: May 14, 1906; Richmond, Virginia, USA
- Died: July 25, 1967 (aged 61); Los Angeles, California, USA
- Other name: John Myers
- Occupation: Sound engineer
- Years active: 1929-1967

Buddy Myers (May 14, 1906 – July 25, 1967) was an American sound engineer. He was nominated for an Academy Award in the category Sound Recording for the film The Brave One. He worked on over 100 films between 1929 and 1967.

== Selected filmography ==
- The Brave One (1956)
