= Friendly Persuasion (1956 film) =

1956 film by William Wyler

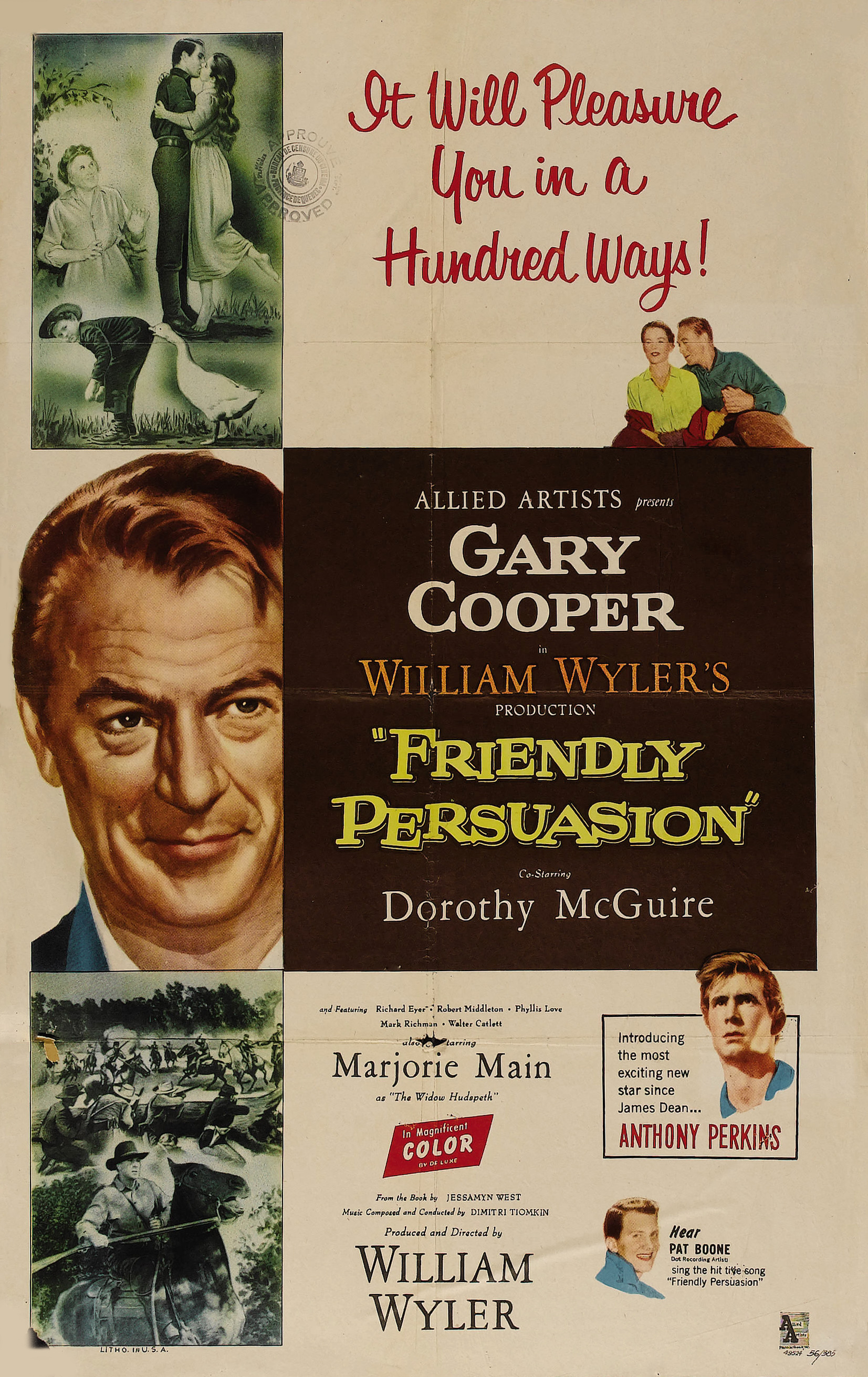
- Poster
- Directed by: William Wyler
- Screenplay by: Michael Wilson
- Based on: The Friendly Persuasion; 1945 novel by Jessamyn West
- Produced by: William Wyler
- Starring: Gary Cooper; Dorothy McGuire; Anthony Perkins; Richard Eyer; Robert Middleton; Phyllis Love; Mark Richman; Walter Catlett; Marjorie Main
- Cinematography: Ellsworth Fredericks
- Edited by: Robert Swink; Edward A. Biery; Robert Belcher
- Music by: Dimitri Tiomkin
- Production companies: William Wyler Productions; Allied Artists Pictures Corporation
- Distributed by: Allied Artists (USA); Metro-Goldwyn-Mayer (foreign)
- Release date: November 25, 1956
- Running time: 137 minutes
- Country: United States
- Language: English
- Budget: $3 million
- Box office: $8 million (as of 1960); 3,051,784 admissions (France)

Friendly Persuasion is a 1956 American Civil War drama film produced and directed by William Wyler. It stars Gary Cooper, Dorothy McGuire, Anthony Perkins, Richard Eyer, Robert Middleton, Phyllis Love, Mark Richman, Walter Catlett and Marjorie Main. The screenplay by Michael Wilson was adapted from the 1945 novel The Friendly Persuasion by Jessamyn West. The film tells the story of a Quaker family in southern Indiana during the American Civil War and the way the war tests their pacifist beliefs.

The film received positive reviews, praised for its performances, but faced some criticism for inaccuracies in portraying Quaker views. It earned $4 million at the box office, won the Palme d'Or at the Cannes Film Festival and received six Academy Award nominations including Best Picture. Michael Wilson, the screenwriter, was initially uncredited due to being on the Hollywood blacklist but was later restored in 1996.

Ronald Reagan gifted the film to Soviet leader Mikhail Gorbachev, symbolizing the pursuit of peaceful solutions to conflicts.

== Plot ==
In Jennings County, Indiana, in 1862, Jess Birdwell is a farmer and patriarch of the Birdwell family, whose Quaker religion conflicts with his love for the worldly enjoyments of music and horse racing. Jess's deeply religious wife, Eliza, a Quaker minister, steadfastly maintains the Quaker peace testimony. Jess's daughter, Mattie, wants to remain a Quaker but has fallen in love with Union cavalry officer Gard Jordan, against her mother's convictions. Jess's elder son, Josh, is torn between hatred of violence and the compulsion to protect his family by joining the home guard to fight invaders. The family's youngest member, "Little Jess", is forever teasing his mother's reciprocating pet goose, Samantha. Enoch, a runaway slave, is a laborer on their farm; his children are still enslaved in the South.

The Quaker community tries to maintain their faith as they go to meeting on First Day (Sunday), contrasted with the attitudes of Birdwells' neighbor, Sam Jordan, and other members of the nearby Methodist Church. Interrupting the Quaker meeting, a Union officer asks how the Quaker men can stand by when their houses will be looted and their families terrorized by approaching Confederate troops. Confronted with the question of being afraid to fight, Josh Birdwell responds that it might be the case. His honesty provokes the wrath of Purdy, a Quaker elder, who condemns people who do not believe as he does.

Meanwhile, the Quaker family tries to resist the temptations of amusements at a county fair. Shell game wagerers, who bet on Little Jess's unfailing ability to spot where the ball is hidden, are disgruntled when his disapproving mother extracts him from the game. At a wrestling match, Josh supports a friend who incurs wagerers' hostility when he refuses to wrestle after hurting his opponent. Over Eliza's religious opposition, Jess buys an organ.

In protest over Jess’s organ purchase, Eliza sleeps in the barn; a tactful Jess joins her there, reaching a compromise to keep the organ in the attic, hidden from visitors. Eliza also urges Jess to resist his "impromptu" Sunday road races with Sam Jordan by getting rid of the dashing but uninspired horse that regularly loses the race. On a business trip, Jess and Josh stay at the Widow Hudspeth's farm, dodging the attentions of the widow and her unmarried daughters. There Jess trades for a homely but fast horse that easily defeats Sam in their next race.

Mattie is mortified when Gard Jordan teases her, after overhearing her praise his looks to Little Jess; however, the two declare their mutual love as Gard leaves for battle. As Jess is cultivating his fields, he notices smoke on the horizon from burning buildings. Josh arrives, informing him the neighboring community has been reduced to ash and corpses. Enoch leaves to avoid being recaptured by Confederates and returned to slavery. Josh's conviction that he must fight threatens to destroy the family. Eliza tells Josh that by turning his back on their religion he is turning his back on her, but Jess disagrees. Finding himself on the front line of battle to stop the advance of the raiders, Josh only fires his gun when the man next to him is wounded. Though Jess is reluctant to fight, when Josh's horse gallops back to the farm riderless, he picks up a rifle and rides off toward the fighting.

When Confederates arrive at the farm, only Eliza, Mattie, and Little Jess are present. To save the family farm, Eliza greets them on the porch, feeds them in the kitchen, and welcomes them to take all the food and animals they want. Despite her nonviolent beliefs, when Eliza sees a Rebel soldier capture her pet, Samantha, Eliza beats the soldier with a broom until he releases the goose unharmed; because of her prior hospitality, he apologizes.

As Jess finds Sam Jordan dying, he is bushwhacked by a Rebel. Playing possum, after the Rebel soldier approaches, Jess struggles with him and takes away his gun. Wresting with his emotions and beliefs, Jess ultimately lets the Rebel go free unhurt. He finds and brings home the injured Josh.

Each member of the family has faced the question of whether it is ever right to engage in violence.

== Cast ==
- Gary Cooper as Jess Birdwell
- Dorothy McGuire as Eliza Birdwell
- Anthony Perkins as Joshua "Josh" Birdwell
- Marjorie Main as the widow Hudspeth
- Richard Eyer as Little Jess Birdwell
- Robert Middleton as Sam Jordan
- Phyllis Love as Martha True "Mattie" Birdwell
- Peter Mark Richman as Gardner "Gard" Jordan (credited as Mark Richman)
- Walter Catlett as Professor Quigley
- Richard Hale as Purdy
- Joel Fluellen as Enoch
- Theodore Newton as Major Harvey
- John Smith as Caleb Cope
- Edna Skinner as Opal Hudspeth
- Marjorie Durant as Pearl Hudspeth
- Frances Farwell as Ruby Hudspeth
- Tom London as Farmer on Front Line with Gard (uncredited)
- James Dobson as Rebel soldier (uncredited)

== Production ==
The film was in development for eight years; producer-director William Wyler brought the project to Allied Artists Pictures Corporation (formerly known as Monogram Pictures Corporation) from Paramount; Allied agreed to a $1.5 million budget for what was Wyler's first film in color for a commercial studio. Wyler had previously shot two documentaries in color in 1944, The Memphis Belle: A Story of a Flying Fortress and the uncredited The Fighting Lady. In 1947, he shot the documentary, Thunderbolt, in color.

The film's shooting location was moved from southern Indiana to a combination of a Republic studio and a San Fernando Valley estate. The film ended up costing over $3 million. The film went over budget to the point that Allied sold the foreign distribution rights to MGM to raise more funds.

Jessamyn West spent a year with the production as both story writer and as technical adviser (credited). Her novel covered a forty-year span of the Birdwell family history and was essentially plotless, so to make the movie effective, she arranged the sequences selected for filming around the Civil War vignette from the novel (altering it significantly for dramatic action) and compressed the whole into a single year, 1862, using the war as the central plot conflict. She created new characters (primarily the Jordans) to fill in for others that had to be deleted, and entirely wrote out Laban, the second eldest son in the novel, substituting a new character, Josh's friend Caleb Cope (John Smith), as a two-scene surrogate. The character Mattie was a composite of the two surviving Birdwell daughters in the novel. Wyler wanted his brother, associate producer Robert Wyler, and author Jessamyn West to receive credit for rewriting the script (also including Wilson), but the WGA ruled that Wilson deserved sole credit for his screenplay.

Cooper expressed initial reservations to West about his character, noting that since in his previous roles "'action seems to come natural to me,' the father should be shown joining the fight. 'There comes a time in a picture of mine when the people watching expect me to do something,' he said. West responded he would do something: 'Refrain. You will furnish your public with the refreshing picture of a strong man refraining.'" Cooper followed West's advice. He researched his role by attending West's Quaker meeting, East Whittier Friends Church. Cooper had not wanted to play the father of grown-up children, although he was 55 in real life. He supposedly disliked the finished film and his own performance.

Dorothy McGuire was cast as Cooper's wife after Wyler's choice, Katharine Hepburn, declined. It was Perkins' second film, after his debut in the 1953 film The Actress; his Broadway success with Tea and Sympathy in the meantime tempted him to remain on the stage, though ultimately he decided to do the film.

During production, cameras for the television documentary series Wide Wide World visited the set. According to show host Dave Garroway, it was the first live broadcast from a movie set.

== Reception ==
According to Bosley Crowther, "thee should be pleasured by this film", noting it is "loaded with sweetness and warmth and as much cracker-barrel Americana as has been spread on the screen in some time." Crowther called Cooper and McGuire "wonderfully spirited and compassionate in their finely complementary roles" and said a "great deal of admiration must go to Anthony Perkins" for making "the older son of the Birdwells a handsome, intense, and chivalrous lad." Variety magazine called it "the simple story of a Quaker family in Indiana back in the 1860s" with "just about everything in the way of comedy and drama, suspense and action"; they also said "figuring importantly in the way the picture plays is Dimitri Tiomkin's conducting of his own score."

The film earned $4 million at the North American box office in 1956. However it struggled to make a profit because of its high cost.

MGM distributed outside the US and Canada. According to their records the film made $732,000, earning the studio a profit of $582,000.

The film also received mild criticism for certain inaccurate portrayals of Quaker views, such as a misunderstanding that although Quakers disliked programmed music they did value individual original expressions of it; and in meetings, Bible passages are not read verbatim but speakers recite scripture from memory and express its meaning in their own words.

== Connection with House Un-American Activities Committee testimony ==
The original screenplay by Michael Wilson was changed significantly in the wake of McCarthyism. The movie script was discussed in 1951 by Michael Wilson in his testimony as an "unfriendly witness" at the House Un-American Activities Committee (HUAC), and by director Frank Capra, who was seeking to dissociate himself from Wilson, who was ultimately placed on the Hollywood blacklist.

Capra, who had originally contracted Wilson to write the screenplay just after the war but then dropped the project, said that although he thought Wilson did "a swell job" adapting West's book, the movie was not produced because he felt "it would be a bad time to produce a picture that might be construed as being antiwar. But we let Wilson work on it until he had finished with it."

Wilson told HUAC in 1951, "I feel that this committee might take the credit, or part of it at least, for the fact that The Friendly Persuasion was not produced, in view of the fact that it dealt warmly, in my opinion, with a peace-loving people."

"What happened to Wilson's pacifist script after Capra dropped it," notes film historian Joseph McBride, "reflected the political climate of the Cold War. When William Wyler directed the film for Allied Artists in 1956 as Friendly Persuasion, he had the story changed to make the Quaker youth (played by Anthony Perkins) become a killer. The Quakers in Wyler's version, as Pauline Kael observed, 'are there only to violate their convictions.' But some of the strength of Wilson's conception remains, as in a scene of a crippled Union Army officer respectfully challenging the steadfast Quakers about pacifism in their meeting house."

On the review aggregator website Rotten Tomatoes, 73% of 11 critics' reviews are positive.

== Ronald Reagan ==
Friendly Persuasion also became a footnote to world history in the 1980s when United States President Ronald Reagan made a gift of the film to Soviet general secretary Mikhail Gorbachev at one of their five summit meetings, suggesting that he view the film as symbolic of the need to find an alternative to war as a means of resolving differences between peoples. One Quaker commentator stated: "Friendly Persuasion seems to me to come about as close to truth and fairness as I expect to see Hollywood get in a treatment of Quakerism; I recommend it to every Quaker parent, as projecting images their children ought to see and imitate...I believe (critics have) woefully misjudged the film, on several counts: its place in American cinema, the characters and their roles, its historicity, and, not least, its value as an expression of the Peace Testimony. Here, for perhaps the only time, I think Ronald Reagan was closer to the truth when he commended the film to Gorbachev because it 'shows not the tragedy of war, but the problems of pacifism, the nobility of patriotism as well as the love of peace.'"

== Awards and honors ==
A week before the year's Oscar nominations were announced, the AMPAS Board of Governors introduced a rule denying an Oscar to anyone who refused to talk to a United States congressional committee. The Writers Guild of America protested the new rule and awarded Michael Wilson the Writers Guild of America Award for Best Written American Drama.

At the 29th Academy Awards, Friendly Persuasion was nominated for 6 awards. Michael Wilson's name could not appear on the ballot because he was blacklisted.

| Award | Category | Nominee(s) | Result | Ref. |
|---|---|---|---|---|
| Academy Awards | Best Motion Picture | William Wyler | Nominated | |
| Academy Awards | Best Director | William Wyler | Nominated | |
| Academy Awards | Best Supporting Actor | Anthony Perkins | Nominated | |
| Academy Awards | Best Screenplay – Adapted | Michael Wilson | Nominated | |
| Academy Awards | Best Song | "Friendly Persuasion (Thee I Love)"; Music by Dimitri Tiomkin; Lyrics by Paul Francis Webster | Nominated | |
| Academy Awards | Best Sound Recording | Gordon R. Glennan and Gordon E. Sawyer | Nominated | |
| Cannes Film Festival | Palme d'Or | William Wyler | Won | |
| Directors Guild of America Awards | Outstanding Directorial Achievement in Motion Pictures | William Wyler | Nominated | |
| Golden Globe Awards | Best Actor in a Motion Picture – Drama | Gary Cooper | Nominated | |
| Golden Globe Awards | Best Supporting Actress – Motion Picture | Marjorie Main | Nominated | |
| Golden Globe Awards | Most Promising Newcomer – Male | Anthony Perkins | Won | |
| Golden Globe Awards | Best Film Promoting International Understanding | | Nominated | |
| National Board of Review Awards | Top Ten Films | | 5th Place | |
| National Board of Review Awards | Best Actress | Dorothy McGuire | Won | |
| Writers Guild of America Awards | Best Written American Drama | Michael Wilson | Won | |

The film is recognized by American Film Institute in these lists:

- 2004: AFI's 100 Years...100 Songs:
  - "Friendly Persuasion (Thee I Love)" – Nominated
- 2005: AFI's 100 Years of Film Scores – Nominated

== Other adaptations ==
Another adaptation of the novel was made for television in 1975, starring Richard Kiley, Shirley Knight, Clifton James and Michael O'Keefe. It was adapted by William P. Wood and directed by Joseph Sargent. This version also included material from Jessamyn West's sequel novel, Except For Thee and Me.

== See also ==
- List of American films of 1956
