= The Brave One (1956 film) =

1956 film by Irving Rapper

- DVD cover
- Directed by: Irving Rapper
- Screenplay by: Harry S. Franklin; Merrill G. White
- Story by: Dalton Trumbo (credited as Robert Rich)
- Based on: Corrida de Toros Original Screenplay (170 pages) by Juan Duval; died before film production; uncredited
- Produced by: Frank King
- Starring: Michel Ray; Rodolfo Hoyos Jr. Elsa Cárdenas; Carlos Navarro; Joi Lansing
- Cinematography: Jack Cardiff
- Edited by: Harry S Franklin and Merrill G. White
- Music by: Victor Young
- Production company: King Brothers Productions
- Distributed by: RKO Radio Pictures
- Release date: October 26, 1956
- Running time: 100 minutes
- Country: United States
- Language: English

The Brave One is a 1956 American drama film directed by Irving Rapper and starring Michel Ray, Rodolfo Hoyos Jr., and Elsa Cárdenas. It tells the story of a Mexican boy who tries to save his beloved bull Gitano from a deadly duel against a champion matador.

The Brave One was the last film to win the Academy Award for Best Story before the award was discontinued, and was nominated for two other Academy Awards: Best Film Editing and Best Sound Recording, but was not a box office or critical success.

== Plot ==
The story is set in Mexico in the 1950s.

During a storm, a cow that has just calved is killed in the pasture. Leonardo, the young son of the cattle herder, takes the animal home, gives him the name "Gitano" and raises him lovingly.

Gitano's mother had been presented to Leonardo's father (Rafael Rosillo) as a gift from his employer (landowner Don Alejandro), in thanks to Rosillo for a great favor he had done for Don Alejandro. But, no written confirmation exists of this gift or of Rosillo's ownership. Leonardo writes to Don Alejandro to ask him for an assurance in writing that Gitano belongs to Leonardo's family.

Don Alejandro, at the time Leonardo writes, is in Europe, taking part in various car races and the letter is slow to reach him. Meanwhile, Don Alejandro's manager has all the young animals branded with Alejandro's brand, including Gitano.

Weeks pass and then to his great joy, Leonardo receives a letter from Don Alejandro with a deed of gift attached.

Years later, when Gitano turns four, Don Alejandro has a fatal accident in a race. Because he is heavily in debt, his entire estate is put up for auction. This includes Gitano because Leonardo can no longer find the deed of gift and the fact that Gitano is branded with Alejandro's brand speaks against Leonardo's ownership.

Gitano is sold and quickly sent to the bullring in Mexico City. Desperate, Leonardo makes his way to the capital to ask the new owner to release Gitano. His efforts to meet with the manager are unsuccessful. Not knowing what else to do, Leonardo goes to the Mexican president in his palace and describes his suffering. The president is so touched by the confidence the boy has that he gives him a letter endorsing the release of Gitano. When Leonardo arrives back at the arena, it is already too late: Gitano is in the arena, fighting with the famous bullfighter Fermin Rivera.

His face streaked with tears, Leonardo watches the bloody spectacle. The banderilleros have just planted their spears in Gitano's back when the matador enters the arena. The bull knows how to evade every attack of the torero. The fight is of unusual length and Gitano's condition is exceptional. The torero has been thrown on the ground twice, when suddenly the cry arises from the crowd: "Indulto!" (Pardon). More and more spectators take up the call and it swells into a hurricane. The entire stadium is transformed into a sea of spectators with white handkerchiefs who want to give life to the brave bull. Shortly before the matador is set to give the fatal blow to Gitano, the Indulto request is granted by the arena management. The matador bows to the bull and steps down. The audience is then horrified when Leonardo jumps into the ring and runs towards the wild bull. In the closing scene, Gitano recognizes in Leonardo his master and companion. Both leave the arena peacefully.

== Cast ==
- Michel Ray as Leonardo
- Rodolfo Hoyos Jr. as Rafael Rosillo
- Elsa Cárdenas as Maria
- Carlos Navarro as Don Alejandro Videgaray
- Joi Lansing as Marion Randall

== Story ==
The story credit was originally given to Robert Rich, a pseudonym used by Dalton Trumbo, one of the Hollywood Ten, who had been jailed for eleven months starting in 1950, then blacklisted for refusing to testify before the House Un-American Activities Committee. It was actually the name of the nephew of the film's producer Frank King. Initially Rich claimed authorship of the screenplay, though his uncles denied the claim. The Academy Award was reissued in Trumbo's name in 1975.

The Nassour brothers sued King Brothers for $750,000 claiming that the story was lifted from Emilio and Bull written by Paul Rader, which the Nassour Brothers had shown the Kings in 1951. The claim was settled out of court.

According to Ted Newsom's 1991 documentary, Hollywood Dinosaurs, the film is based on El Toro Estrella, "about a boy, a bull, and a dinosaur", upon which the films The Beast of Hollow Mountain and The Valley of Gwangi are based. It details the screenwriting controversy but notes that The Brave One does not include the dinosaur.

== Awards ==
- Academy Awards:
  - Best Writing, Motion Picture Story (Dalton Trumbo writing under the pseudonym "Robert Rich")
  - Best Film Editing – Nominated (Merrill G. White)
  - Best Sound – Recording – Nominated (Buddy Myers)
- Golden Globe Awards:
  - Best Film Promoting International Understanding

== Release ==
The King Brothers later sued RKO for mismanaging the distribution and sale of the film, claiming $6 million in damages.

== Reception ==
Washington's Evening Star wrote: "'The Brave One'…is a movie that yearns almost plaintively to please. It has every quality traditionally regard as surefire at the box office: a small boy hero, a bull calf the boy cherishes, a sunlit CinemaScope landscape, a rags to riches plot, a sentimental music score, etc….The single quality overlooked in the film is that the attempt to be irresistable can be cloyingly overdone and that discerning moviegoers are quick to see when they are playing against a marked deck. Whose principal card, by the way, is a small boy named Michel Ray who is rather more sheer angel than is good for realism. Against these questionable merits, 'The Brave One' offers a large slice of attractive Mexican landscape and some vigorously honest bull fight scenes….the picture demands a happy ending, and nothing, not even [bullfighter] Rivera, is going to prevent its having one."

== Home media ==
A restored version was released in 2016 on Blu-ray.

== Comic book adaptation ==
- Dell Four Color #773 (February 1957)

== See also ==
- List of American films of 1956
