= Jessamyn West (writer) =

American author (1902–1984)

- West in 1954
- Born: Mary Jessamyn West; July 18, 1902; Vernon, Indiana, U.S.
- Died: February 23, 1984 (aged 81); Napa County, California, U.S.
- Occupation: Writer
- Spouse: Harry Maxwell McPherson
- Children: 1; Ann McCarthy Cash
- Relatives: Richard Nixon (second cousin)

Mary Jessamyn West (July 18, 1902 – February 23, 1984) was an American author of short stories and novels, notably The Friendly Persuasion (1945). A Quaker from Indiana, she graduated from Fullerton Union High School in 1919 and Whittier College in 1923. There she helped found the Palmer Society in 1921. She received an honorary Doctor of Letters (Litt.D) degree from Whittier College in 1946. She received the Janet Heidinger Kafka Prize in 1975.

== Personal life ==
West was born in Vernon, Indiana, to Eldo Roy West and Grace Anna Milhous. She was a second cousin of Richard Nixon through her mother's father. Her family left Indiana for California when she was six. They stayed for a time on an orange ranch (which she wrote about later in Cress Delahanty) before settling in nearby Yorba Linda. Her siblings included two brothers and a sister: Merle, Myron, and Carmen. Growing up in the West Home in the same rural Yorba Linda region as Nixon, Jessamyn attended a Sunday school class taught by Nixon's father, Frank, whom she characterized as "a fiery persuasive teacher." She subsequently commented that Frank Nixon's version of the social gospel inclined her politically toward socialism.

In 1923, West married Harry Maxwell McPherson. They moved to Hemet, California where she worked for four years as a teacher in a one-room schoolhouse. In 1929, she studied at Oxford University during a summer session before returning to the U.S. for graduate work at the University of California, Berkeley. While preparing to complete her doctorate degree, she was stricken with tuberculosis. In August 1932, she entered La Viña Sanatorium near Pasadena. Her chances of recovery were not considered good. At one point, the doctors said she should be taken home to die (an experience she would describe in The Woman Said Yes). However, she did finally recover, and in 1934 she rejoined her husband who was teaching in Mt. Shasta, California. In 1940, they moved to Napa when her husband obtained a job as a high school principal. She remained in Napa until her death.

== Work ==
In 1939, West published her first literary work, a short story called "99.6". It was a fictionalized account of her stay in the sanatorium. She then began selling more short stories to small literary magazines. Her first published novel concerned a family of Quakers living in Indiana, despite the fact that she grew up and lived her adult life in California. Asked about this in an interview, she said, "I write about Indiana because knowing little about it, I can create it." Comparing herself to other authors who created fictional universes, she remarked:

"Roth wrote The Breast. Would you ask him how he could do this since he had never been a breast? Adams wrote Watership Down. Would you ask him how he could do this since he admitted his rabbit knowledge came from a book about rabbits? ... And those hobbits!... I am a bigger risk-taker than these others. The Hoosiers can contradict me. No rabbit, hobbit, or breast has been known to speak up in reply to their exploiters."

Her Quaker stories, although shaped by her imagination, are loosely based on tales she heard from her mother and grandmother about their life in rural Indiana. The Birdwell family, depicted in her books The Friendly Persuasion and Except for Me and Thee, are derived from Joshua and Elizabeth Milhous, the great-grandparents she shared with Richard Nixon.

=== The Friendly Persuasion ===
The Friendly Persuasion (1945) is West's best-known work. The New York Times book reviewer Orville Prescott called it "as fresh and engaging, tender and touching a book as ever was called sentimental by callous wretches... There have been plenty of louder and more insistent books this year, but few as sure and mellow as The Friendly Persuasion."

The novel was adapted into the 1956 movie Friendly Persuasion, starring Gary Cooper and directed by William Wyler. It was nominated for an Academy Award for Best Picture. West's memoir To See the Dream recounts her experiences as one of the writers tasked with revising Michael Wilson's early screenplay adaptation, which had been commissioned by director Frank Capra in the late 1940s.

Except for Me and Thee, her 1969 sequel to The Friendly Persuasion, was adapted into a 1975 television movie, titled Friendly Persuasion, starring Richard Kiley.

=== Cress Delahanty ===
Cress Delahanty (1953) is a collection of vignettes about a sensitive and artistic teenage girl, Crescent "Cress" Delahanty, growing up in rural Orange County, California in the pre-World War II period. Some of the book's chapters were previously published in slightly different form in The New Yorker, Woman's Day and Ladies' Home Journal. Cress Delahanty was a Book of the Month Club selection for January 1954. Los Angeles Times book reviewer Milton Merlin called it "a richly rewarding story of five mysterious, unpredictable and adventurous years in a girl's life on a Southern California ranch.... Jessamyn West never reaches out for spectacular incidents. She doesn't have to, for growing up has enough excitement, amusement and heartbreak in itself for any novel. This is one that you'll remember and that will make you remember."

== Bibliography ==
=== Novels ===
- The Friendly Persuasion (1945)
- The Witch Diggers (1951)
- Cress Delahanty (1953)
- South of the Angels (1960)
- A Matter of Time (1966)
- Leafy Rivers (1967)
- The Chilekings (1967) aka Little Men, novella
- Except for Me and Thee (1969)
- The Massacre at Fall Creek (1975)
- The Life I Really Lived (1979)
- The State of Stony Lonesome (1984)

=== Stories ===
- Love, Death, and the Ladies' Drill Team (1955)
- Crimson Ramblers of the World, Farewell (1970)
- The Story of a Story & Three Stories (1982)
- Collected Stories of Jessamyn West (1986)

=== Memoir ===
- To See the Dream (1957)
- Hide and Seek (1973)
- The Woman Said Yes: Encounters with Life and Death (1976)
- Double Discovery (1980)

=== Other ===
- A Mirror for the Sky (1948), musical drama
- Love Is Not What You Think (1959), essay
- The Quaker Reader (1962), anthology
- The Secret Look (1974), poetry

=== Short fiction ===
Title	Publication	Collected in
"99.6"	Broun's Nutmeg (June 10, 1939)	Crimson Ramblers of the World, Farewell
"Homecoming"	American Prefaces (Summer 1939)	Love, Death, and the Ladies' Drill Team
"The Day of the Hawk"	Foothills 1.3 (Fall 1939)	Crimson Ramblers of the World, Farewell
"The Mush Pot"	Foothills 1.4 (Winter 1939–40)	from Cress Delahanty
"Music on the Muscatatuck"	Prairie Schooner 14.2 (Summer 1940)	from The Friendly Persuasion
"The Child's Day"	New Mexico Quarterly Review 10.4 (November 1940)	from Cress Delahanty
"The Snow Is Dancing"	Yankee (January 1941)	-
"Flow Gently, Sweet Aspirin"	New Masses (January 21, 1941)	Collected Stories
"The Stove That Had the Devil in It"	Decade of Short Stories (November–December 1941)	-
"I'll Ask Him to Come Sooner"	The Tanager (December 1941)	Crimson Ramblers of the World, Farewell
"The Linden Trees"	The Tanager (February 1943)	Love, Death, and the Ladies' Drill Team
"Reverdy"	New Mexico Quarterly Review 13.1 (Spring 1943)	Collected Stories
"Night Piece for Julia"	Rocky Mountain Review 8.1 (Fall 1943)	Crimson Ramblers of the World, Farewell
"The Illumination"	Harper's Bazaar (October 1943)	from The Friendly Persuasion
"Shivaree Before Breakfast"	Collier's (January 22, 1944)	from The Friendly Persuasion
"Tom Wolfe's My Name"	New Mexico Quarterly Review 14.2 (Summer 1944)	Love, Death, and the Ladies' Drill Team
"A Likely Exchange"	The Atlantic (July 1944)	from The Friendly Persuasion
"First Day Finish"	The Atlantic (August 1944)	from The Friendly Persuasion
"The Real Pearl"	Junior Bazaar (Fall 1944)	-
"Lead Her Like a Pigeon"	The Atlantic (December 1944)	from The Friendly Persuasion
"The Singing Lesson"	Harper's (January 1945)	Love, Death, and the Ladies' Drill Team
"The Leppert"	Senior Scholastic (April 23, 1945)	from South of the Angels
"Pictures from a Clapboard House"	New Mexico Quarterly Review 15.2 (Summer 1945)	from The Friendly Persuasion
"A Pretty Thing"	Ladies' Home Journal (July 1945)	from The Friendly Persuasion
"The Meeting House"	The Atlantic (July 1945)	from The Friendly Persuasion
"The Carnal Room"	Collier's (July 21, 1945)	from The Friendly Persuasion
"Gallup Poll" aka "The Love Ballot"	The American Magazine (August 1945)	Crimson Ramblers of the World, Farewell
"Homer and the Lilies"	Ladies' Home Journal (August 1945)	from The Friendly Persuasion
"The Pacing Goose"	Collier's (August 11, 1945)	from The Friendly Persuasion
"The Buried Leaf"	The Atlantic (September 1945)	from The Friendly Persuasion
"The Battle of Finney's Ford"	Harper's (September 1945)	from The Friendly Persuasion
"Probably Shakespeare" aka "A Little Walk with Brother"	Woman's Home Companion (September 1945)	Collected Stories
"The Wake"	Town & Country (October 1945)	Collected Stories
"The Blackboard"	Town & Country (November 1945)	-
"Presumed Missing"	Mademoiselle (January 1946)	-
"Like Visitant of Air"	Tomorrow (February 1946)	Crimson Ramblers of the World, Farewell
"A Time of Learning"	Ladies' Home Journal (March 1946)	Love, Death, and the Ladies' Drill Team
"The Spring of Life"	The American Magazine (April 1946)	-
"Grandpa Was Her Mirror"	Harper's (May 1946)	from Cress Delahanty
"There'll Come a Day"	Collier's (May 11, 1946)	-
"There Ought to Be a Judge"	Mademoiselle (June 1946)	Crimson Ramblers of the World, Farewell
"Grand Opening"	Ladies' Home Journal (September 1946)	Collected Stories
"The Sump Hole"	The New Yorker (December 14, 1946)	from Cress Delahanty
"Horace Chooney, M.D."	Mademoiselle (February 1947)	Love, Death, and the Ladies' Drill Team
"Another World Entirely"	New Mexico Quarterly Review 17.1 (Spring 1947)	-
"Alive and Real"	Harper's Bazaar (September 1947)	Crimson Ramblers of the World, Farewell
"Perigord"	Ladies' Home Journal (January 1948)	-
"A Little Collar for the Monkey" aka "A Gift for the Bride's Mother"	Woman's Home Companion (February 1948)	Love, Death, and the Ladies' Drill Team
"Road to the Isles"	The New Yorker (February 21, 1948)	from Cress Delahanty
"The Heavy Stone"	The American Magazine (March 1948)	Crimson Ramblers of the World, Farewell
"The Mysteries of Life in an Ordinary Manner"	The New Yorker (March 27, 1948)	Love, Death, and the Ladies' Drill Team
"The Hat"	Ladies' Home Journal (May 1948)	from Cress Delahanty
"Mr. Powers"	The New Yorker (July 24, 1948)	from Cress Delahanty
"Summer of Signs and Portents"	The New Yorker (August 28, 1948)	from Cress Delahanty
"Public-Address System"	Harper's (October 1948)	Love, Death, and the Ladies' Drill Team
"The Pismire Plan"	Cross Section: A Collection of New American Writing (1948)	-
"Arma Virumque Cano"	Harper's (January 1949)	from Cress Delahanty
"The Beckoning Years"	Ladies' Home Journal (May 1949)	from Except for Me and Thee
"The Ouija Board"	The Yale Review (December 1949)	-
"Learn to Say Good-Bye" aka "The Lesson"	The New Yorker (August 11, 1951)	Love, Death, and the Ladies' Drill Team
"Love, Death, and the Ladies' Drill Team"	The New Yorker (September 22, 1951)	Love, Death, and the Ladies' Drill Team
"King Midas in Reverse"	Colorado Quarterly 1.1 (Summer 1952)	from Cress Delahanty
"Child of the Century"	Woman's Day (November 1952)	Crimson Ramblers of the World, Farewell
"Mr. Cornelius, I Love You"	Collier's (November 22, 1952)	from Cress Delahanty
"A Few Lines for Mrs. Charlesbois"	Woman's Day (December 1952)	from Cress Delahanty
"Breach of Promise"	Harper's (April 1953)	Love, Death, and the Ladies' Drill Team
"You Can't Talk About It"	Ladies' Home Journal (July 1953)	from Cress Delahanty
"Four Ways to Look at a Horse"	Woman's Day (December 1953)	from Except for Me and Thee
"Little Men"	Star Short Novels (1954)	The Chilekings
"The Battle of the Suits"	The New Yorker (February 5, 1955)	Love, Death, and the Ladies' Drill Team
"Foot-Shaped Shoes" aka "You've Got to Grow Up Sometime"	The Saturday Evening Post (March 12, 1955)	Love, Death, and the Ladies' Drill Team
"The Condemned Librarian"	Harper's (July 1955)	Crimson Ramblers of the World, Farewell
"Little Jess and the Outrider"	Ladies' Home Journal (October 1955)	from Except for Me and Thee
"The Picnickers"	The Kenyon Review 24.2 (Spring 1962)	from Except for Me and Thee
"Aloha, Farewell to Thee" aka "Search for Tomorrow"	Good Housekeeping (June 1962)	Collected Stories
"The Last Laugh"	Redbook (July 1962)	from The State of Stony Lonesome
"The Second (Or Perhaps Third) Time Round" aka "In Search of a Kiss"	Good Housekeeping (June 1963)	Collected Stories
"For One Golden Moment"	Good Housekeeping (November 1963)	from The State of Stony Lonesome
"Hunting for Hoot Owls"	Harper's (January 1964)	Crimson Ramblers of the World, Farewell
"Good-Bye, Bossy"	Ladies' Home Journal (June 1965)	-
"Underground"	Good Housekeeping (January 1968)	from Except for Me and Thee
"The Birthday Suit"	The Saturday Evening Post (October 5, 1968)	from Except for Me and Thee
"Mother's Day"	The New Yorker (May 30, 1970)	Crimson Ramblers of the World, Farewell
"Up a Tree"	Crimson Ramblers of the World, Farewell (1970)	Crimson Ramblers of the World, Farewell
"Crimson Ramblers of the World, Farewell"	Crimson Ramblers of the World, Farewell (1970)	Crimson Ramblers of the World, Farewell
"Live Life Deeply"	Crimson Ramblers of the World, Farewell (1970)	Crimson Ramblers of the World, Farewell
"A Man Like a Mule"	The Story of a Story & Three Stories (1982)	The Story of a Story & Three Stories
"Babes in the Woods"	The Story of a Story & Three Stories (1982)	The Story of a Story & Three Stories
"The Calla Lilly Cleaners & Dyers"	Collected Stories (1986)	Collected Stories
