= Louis Clyde Stoumen =

American photographer

- Born: July 15, 1917; Springtown, Bucks County, Pennsylvania, U.S.
- Died: September 20, 1991 (aged 74); Sebastopol, California, U.S.
- Occupations: Film director Photographer; Film producer
- Years active: 1950–1964

Louis Clyde Stoumen (July 15, 1917 – September 20, 1991), known as Lou Stoumen, was an American photographer, film director and producer. He won two Academy Awards; the first in 1957 for Best Documentary Short Subject (The True Story of the Civil War), and the second in 1963 for Best Documentary Feature (Black Fox: The Rise and Fall of Adolf Hitler).

Stoumen was born in Springtown, Bucks County, Pennsylvania, and died in Sebastopol, California. After graduating from Lehigh University in 1939, he worked as a freelance journalist and photographer in New York. Many of the photographs of Times Square he made were published in the 1985 book Times Square: 45 Years of Photographs.

Stoumen taught at UCLA Film School. He spoke of his innovation in The True Story of the Civil War. He invented a track for the camera to move back and forth over historic photos and paintings. It also tracked up and down (in and out). The technique is often referred to today as the "Ken Burns effect".

Stoumen received Colin Higgins' master's thesis, a screenplay called Harold and Maude. Stoumen spoke of his enjoyment of the writing, but doubted it would ever be produced. He wasn't unhappy when proven wrong by the film's success.

Stoumen married Lini De Vries in 1943; the couple divorced in 1949. He subsequently married and was divorced from Joyce Wessel.

After his death in 1991, the Stoumen Estate gifted the entire archive of Stoumen's work, including copyright, to the Museum of Photographic Arts. MOPA created a special exhibition and catalog entitled Seduced by Life: The Art of Lou Stoumen in celebration of acquiring the Stoumen Archive. Copyright for Stoumen's work is currently administered by the Museum of Photographic Arts.

The Academy Film Archive preserved The True Story of the Civil War and T Is for Tumbleweed by Stoumen.

== Selected filmography ==
- The Naked Eye (1956)
- The True Story of the Civil War (1956)
- Operation Dames (1959)
- Black Fox: The Rise and Fall of Adolf Hitler (1962)
