= Olaf Dalsgaard-Olsen =

Danish film producer

- Born: January 10, 1903; Esbjerg, Denmark
- Died: October 4, 1988 (aged 85); Frederiksberg, Denmark
- Occupation: Film producer
- Years active: 1944–1974

Olaf Dalsgaard-Olsen (January 10, 1903 – October 4, 1988) was a Danish film producer who was nominated for the Academy Award for Best International Feature Film in 1956 for his film Qivitoq.

== Filmography ==
Year	Title	Role	Notes
1956	Qivitoq	—	producer only

== Awards and nominations ==
Year	Award	Category	Nominated work	Result	Ref
1956	Academy Award	Academy Award for Best International Feature Film	Qivitoq	Nominated	
