= André Michel (director) =

French film director

- Born: 7 november 1907; Paris, France
- Died: 5 June 1989 (aged 81)
- Occupations: Film director, screenwriter
- Years active: 1947–1983

André Michel (7 November 1907 – 5 June 1989) was a French film director and screenwriter. He directed 15 films between 1947 and 1983. He is the father of novelist Natacha Michel who is also a political activist and militant. In 1962 he was a member of the jury at the 12th Berlin International Film Festival.

== Selected filmography ==
- Fight Without Hate (1948)
- Three Women (1952)
- Confession Under Four Eyes (1954)
- La Sorcière (1956)
