= Gordon R. Glennan =

American sound engineer (1903–1995)

- Born: September 28, 1903
- Died: January 7, 1995 (aged 91)
- Occupation: Sound engineer
- Years active: 1956

Gordon R. Glennan (September 28, 1903 – January 7, 1995) was an American sound engineer. He was nominated for an Academy Award in the category Best Sound Recording for the film Friendly Persuasion.

== Selected filmography ==
- Friendly Persuasion (1956)
