= The Naked Eye (1956 film) =

1956 film

- Directed by: Louis Clyde Stoumen
- Produced by: Louis Clyde Stoumen
- Starring
- Narrated by: Raymond Massey
- Production company: Camera Eye Pictures
- Distributed by: Film Representations Inc.
- Release date: 1956
- Country: United States
- Language: English

The Naked Eye is a 1956 American documentary film about the history of photography directed by Louis Clyde Stoumen.

== Technique ==
In a 1961 letter to The New York Times, the photographer-filmmaker surveyed earlier uses of the technique of moving still images by himself and others:

“Curt Oertel made his ‘Michaelangelo,’ with important storytelling use of still material, in 1940 (released as Robert Flaherty’s ‘The Titan’ around 1949). Belgium’s Henri Starc began imparting dramatic film form to still images in 1936, and his lyric ‘World of Paul Delvaux’ (1947) is an acknowledged classic. Paul Haesaerts made ‘Rubens’ in 1948. Americans Paul Falkenberg and Lewis Jacobs made ‘Lincoln Speaks at Gettysburg’ entirely out of nineteenth-century engravings, 1950. Ben Berg and Herbert Block of Hollywood have for years been making a series of story-telling dramas out of paintings and prints, including a life story of Goya. I myself pioneered the dramatic use of still photographs (rather than paintings or prints) in a story-telling sequence for Arch Oboler’s 1950 Columbia feature ‘Five,’ and have for more than a decade continued development of this form—in my independent feature ‘The Naked Eye’ (1956), the featurette ‘The True Story of the Civil War’ (an Academy Award winner, 1956), Warner Brothers’ ‘The James Dean Story’ (1957), and most recently...for...ABC-TV’s ‘Winston Churchill, the Valiant Years.”

== Accolades ==
It was nominated for an Academy Award for Best Documentary Feature.

== Cast ==
- Raymond Massey as Narrator
- Edward Weston
