= The Friendly Persuasion =

1945 novel by Jessamyn West

- First edition
- Author: Jessamyn West
- Language: English
- Genre: Historical fiction
- Publisher: Harcourt, Inc.
- Publication date: 1945
- Publication place: United States
- Media type: Print
- Pages: 214
- ISBN: 0-15-602909-X

The Friendly Persuasion is an American novel published in 1945 by Jessamyn West. It was adapted as the Oscar-nominated motion picture Friendly Persuasion in 1956. The book consists of 14 vignettes about a Quaker farming family, the Birdwells, living near the town of Vernon in southern Indiana along "the banks of the Muscatatuck, where once the woods stretched, dark row on row." The Birdwells' farm, Maple Grove Nursery, was handed down to them by pioneering forebears who came west nearly fifty years before the time period depicted at the outset of the novel.

West published the vignettes between 1940 and 1945 as individual stories in Prairie Schooner, Collier's, Harper's Bazaar, The Atlantic Monthly, Ladies' Home Journal, New Mexico Quarterly, and Harper's Magazine. She then had them reprinted for The Friendly Persuasion in more or less chronological order covering a forty-year span of the Birdwell family in the latter half of the 19th Century. (Note: In the opening chapter, Jess and Quigley debate the merits of Abraham Lincoln and Stephen A. Douglas, making the year 1858. Jess is approximately 40 at the time, and so the last chapter likely takes place in 1898.)

West gained the background material for the stories while recuperating at home from a nearly fatal bout with tuberculosis in the early 1930s. Having gone home to die, she improbably recovered. During her convalescence, her mother, Grace Milhous West, shared with her many childhood memories of growing up as a Quaker girl in southern Indiana, and particularly of grandparents Joshua and Elizabeth Milhous, who became the models for the Birdwells. At the time of her illness, West had quit teaching to write, initially without success. The enforced inactivity of her recovery resulted in a prolific output of short stories. In 1969, she published a companion novel, Except for Me and Thee, whose stories filled in the history of the Birdwells, including how they courted, married, and moved to Indiana.

== Characters ==
Birdwell household

- Jess – Husband and father, Jess is a nurseryman originally from Germantown, Pennsylvania. He is a "birthright Quaker" whose Irish family have been of the faith for 200 years. While "Quaker through and through," the large, sturdy red-haired Jess has a love of music and fast horses. Completely devoted to his wife, he nevertheless asserts his authority as head of the household when she demands rather than asks for adherence to her views. (Note: West modeled Jess on her great-grandfather Joshua Vickers Milhouse and named him after her grandfather Jesse Griffith Milhous. (Farmer, p. 22))
- Eliza – The mother of seven (one of whom died young), Eliza is the strong-willed Quaker minister of the Grove Meeting House who has on the whole been sheltered from the harsher realities of life. "Work-brickel and good-looking as female preachers are apt to be," she is small, dark haired with soft black eyes and runs her household with a firm but gentle touch. (Note: Eliza's personality was based on West's recollections of her own maternal grandmother Mary Frances McManaman. (Farmer, p. 23))
- Joshua (Josh) – The eldest Birdwell child, Josh is fastidious, conscientious and earnest. He has his mother's small slender stature, fine dark hair parted down the middle, and her black eyes "flecked with green." A young adolescent at the novel's outset, he worries that the contentment and peace that he observes in his parents is not the normal fruit of becoming an adult.
- Laban (Labe) – Three years younger than Josh, Labe is a husky, unkempt, but good-natured boy with blond curly hair and a love for the outdoors. A natural athlete, he is the antithesis of Josh, "just plain dirty and messy and everybody loved him." Labe conscientiously avoids all forms of violence because he sees in himself a love of it.
- Martha Truth (Mattie) – The older and for many years only Birdwell daughter, Mattie shares her father's love of music and while an adolescent, a girl's romanticism, rebelliousness against her parents, and intense, mercurial emotions. Josh sees his sister as an inveterate drama queen. West created Mattie with her own mother in mind, imagining what she was like as a youth.
- Little Jess – Freckled, red-haired, and all boy, Little Jess imagines himself an explorer of exotic locales as he plays.
- Jane – The youngest Birdwell daughter, she is fifteen in the vignette in which she plays a role, when Jess is 62. Both Jane and her brother Stephen appear only in the second half of the narrative, and apparently are later life children born well after Josh, Labe, and Mattie. Jane is marked by gray eyes and an adolescent's sensitivity about her looks.
- Stephen (Steve) – Stephen Birdwell has only one vignette in which he is a major character. He is his mother's youngest child and clear favorite, even-tempered and contented with his life.
- Elspeth Bent – Jess and Eliza's young granddaughter, Elspeth is Mattie's child from her marriage to Gard Bent. Stephen is very fond of Elspeth, calling her "Aunt Jetty."
- Enoch – The Birdwell's hired man during all or most of their married life in Indiana, Enoch is green-eyed and blond-haired. He is an expert on horse flesh and his own interpretation of the Bible, but was hired as much for his conversational abilities as his work.
- Emanuela – The family's hired woman, very dark-skinned and mannish, (Note: West hints that Emanuela is possibly of mixed racial blood and may have come to the Birdwells just before or during the Civil War.) Emanuela has been in service with the Birdwells for 20 years when she makes her first appearance in the novel. Like many non-Birdwell characters, Emanuela is odd, speaking only in rhyme and therefore only speaking when she can think one.

Other characters

- Gardiner Bent (Gard) – Gard is the oldest son of the peculiar Bents, Jud and Lavony, a handsome boy with black hair and light brown eyes on the edge of manhood when he first appears as Mattie's future beau. Gard is a learned reader like his father, has finished schooling, and is trying for a teacher's position at the nearby Rush Branch school. Gard and Mattie are immediately comfortable in each other's presence.
- Reverend Marcus Augustus Godley – The minister of the Bethel Church is a big, corpulent and florid man from Kentucky, bombastic and haughty by nature, and given to full-voiced preaching in his discourse.

== Plot ==
The Friendly Persuasion has as its common theme linking the fourteen chapters (only two of which, "A Likely Exchange" and "First Day Finish" are otherwise connected) the effects of the Quaker religion on members of a family and their interaction with their neighbors. West uses rich descriptives of geography and setting to bring out the dignity and strength of her characters. However her stated purpose in telling their story is to present descriptions of "real life" and "reality" as she understands them, not to elucidate the religion, stating that the Birdwells are characters "who happened to be Quaker" rather than personifications of Quaker traits.

Three stories ("Shivaree Before Breakfast," "Lead Her Like a Pigeon,"and "Homer and the Lilies") were based on recollections of West's mother (Grace) from her own girlhood. Family stories about her great-grandfather were the source for three others ("Music on the Muscatatuck,"A Likely Exchange," and "First Day Finish"). Although not connected to her own family or Quakers, "The Pacing Goose" was based on an actual incident chronicled in a compendium of early Indiana court cases.

=== Music on the Muscatatuck ===
In 1858 Jess Birdwell's tree nursery is flourishing, bringing him contentment. As a Quaker, however, the one flaw in his happy life is that his religion disdains music as frivolous. He travels by train to Philadelphia and meets Professor Waldo Quigley, a traveling salesman for a company that sells pump organs. Jess accepts Quigley's invitation to hear a tune played and impulsively purchases an organ. When it arrives, Eliza errs in confusing her role as Quaker minister with that of spouse and makes an ultimatum that Jess can either have an organ or a wife, but not both. Jess, "a mild man until pushed" and about to recant, immediately meets her challenge and moves the organ into their house. Eliza protests by sitting in the snow. After being chilled to the bone, forcing her to think through the issue, she compromises with herself by allowing the issue to be between Jess and God, and with Jess by allowing the organ in the house but only in the attic. Jess is visited by the meeting's Ministry and Oversight Committee, concerned that Brother Birdwell is possibly not "standing squarely in the light." Mattie unfortunately picks that moment to play the instrument, but Jess saves his own and Eliza's reputation by an impassioned prayer of contrition that drowns out the music, earning the admiration of the committee.

=== Shivaree Before Breakfast ===
One morning while passing the home of their neighbor Old Alf Applegate, a widower, Labe hears him speaking to someone and believes he has married again. He talks Josh into giving Old Alf a shivaree before dawn to celebrate. The boys, ten and thirteen, hear Old Alf speaking to "Molly darling" when they arrive, but he denies having a new wife. Old Alf explains that he could no longer bear the silence following the death of his wife and invented "Molly" to talk to so that he can hear his own voice. Josh believes Old Alf to be crazy but agrees to keep quiet lest the rest of the neighbors think so also, while Labe understands the old man completely.

=== The Pacing Goose ===
Jess knows that spring is upon them again when Eliza begins yearning for geese as she does every year. Jess is dead set against geese as being destructive of new crops, but Eliza reveals she bought eight goose eggs from their neighbors the Overbys and set them under a hen to hatch. Jess cajoles Enoch to puncture the eggs with a darning needle, on the premise that their "fox-eared" neighbors sold them bad eggs to begin with, but Enoch's conscience won't let him destroy all eight. One hatches that Eliza names Samantha and takes for a pampered pet. Samantha disappears late that autumn and Eliza finds her back at the Overbys, who deny that she is the same goose. Despite a Quaker aversion for courtroom trials, Eliza brings suit against the Overbys for return of the goose. At the trial, after Milt Overby's truculence and Eliza's insistence that she identified Samantha among 39 other geese because Samantha has the gait of "a born pacer," the young visiting judge awards Eliza the goose. Jess finds the identification dubious until they get home. Upon uncrating the goose, he and Enoch observe that two-legged Samantha does indeed walk with the swing of a four-legged pacing horse. When Samantha maliciously bites Enoch on the leg, that identification is certain. Jess avers that although he still has no use for trials, he learned valuable lessons from it about the virtues of dependable women and the choosing of hired men.

=== Lead Her Like a Pigeon ===
Near the end of May, Eliza sends Mattie to deliver newly baked cookies to their eccentric neighbors, the Bents, as a sharing gesture. She stops to pick flowers and encounters the oldest Bent son, Gardiner, home from the Normal School in nearby Vernon, where he is studying to become a teacher. Gard walks her to his family's farm, where his mother returns the favor by filling her box with freshly cleaned catfish. Mattie misses supper but has no appetite when she returns home, and Eliza discerns from a tune she is humming (Note: Mattie says that the song is "Lead Her Like a Pigeon", which she heard one of Gard's brothers trying to play on a homemade horn.) that Mattie is taken with Gard and yearning to be a woman. Eliza innocently gives her daughter advice about judging men and Mattie bursts into tears, accusing her mother of trying to push her out. Eliza realizes that Mattie has glimpsed leaving home as a wife. While Jess recalls that Eliza herself once similarly shed tears, Eliza remembers leaving home as a happy time, humming the same song as Mattie, which she also fancied in her youth. (Note: The actual title of the folk song is Weevily Wheat, whose lyrics include the phrase "lead her like a pigeon." (West, p. 54))

=== The Battle of Finney's Ford ===
In July 1863 Confederate cavalryman John Morgan has all of southern Indiana nervous by plundering and destroying on a raid. The young men are especially anxious wondering if they will be called upon to resist Morgan by force. As rumors place Morgan near Vernon, 18-year-old Josh tells his family that he will be joining the others to fight, and if necessary kill, to defend his home. Although the family tries to dissuade him, they help him prepare, Eliza making him food, Mattie giving him her New Testament, and Labe bringing him their best horse at Jess's insistence that he be well-mounted. He joins the Home Guard stationed at a bridge south of town, where after a prolonged wait, a solitary rebel scout demands their surrender, which the men refuse with a show of defiance. When no attack follows, the men are scattered along the river to guard fords bypassing the bridge. Late that night a confrontation in the dark throws the Guard into confusion, and when Josh tries to find his horse, he is struck in the head and knocked unconscious. Awaking hours later, he discovers that he stepped off the rim of an unseen cliff and that the "attack" was only local farmers trying to herd their cattle across the ford. Not seriously hurt, Josh returns home to his thankful family, satisfied that he had at least stood up to the challenge, and grateful to God that he is now wiser about war and bravado without actually having to fight.

=== The Buried Leaf ===
Mattie hates the sound of her name and is angry with her father for not permitting her to change it to "Gladys." Little Jess has a dream about finding buried treasure and begins digging in the cellar of the old log cabin, which was erected by Birdwell forebears 50 years before as the first house on the farm but burned down earlier in the summer. Mattie helps him unearth a small box and the entire family is excited by the find, which contains only a page ripped out of a Bible. The page has been signed by her great-uncle, Jordan Birdwell, a crippled old man who traveled to the spot by wagon from South Carolina with only his young daughter Mattie to care for him and hunt to keep them fed. Jess explains that when the cabin was built, Great-Uncle Jerd buried the page as a "remembrance of what'd been done for us and given to us," his descendants. The daughter married in the cabin on her 17th birthday and continued west by wagon train. With this knowledge of her namesake, Mattie sees her name in a new light and impulsively forgives her father, who has no idea why.

=== A Likely Exchange ===
In October Jess travels to Kentucky to take orders for nursery stock and to trade horses if he can. His Red Rover has humiliated both Jess and Eliza (albeit for different reasons) by racing—and losing—to Black Prince, the horse of the Bethel Church's minister, the Reverend Marcus Augustus Godley. Eliza knows that the big red gelding is a temptation to race because of his looks, while Jess hopes to redeem himself with a horse of less appearance that nevertheless is fast. He finds the answer in the widow Hudspeth's Lady, a mare so ugly "she looked like she had cow blood in her," but being half Morgan horse, will not ever allow herself to be passed. Mrs. Hudspeth fears that a racy horse will scare away potential suitors for her four plain daughters and takes a liking to the beautiful but unspirited Red Rover. After the trade, Jess is content, knowing he has fulfilled the letter if not the spirit of Eliza's request. The two horses (and the late Otto Hudspeth) repeatedly teach him the (spiritual) lesson "not to judge man or beast by outward show."

=== First Day Finish ===
When Jess returns to Maple Grove Nursery, he finds the Reverend Godley visiting. The minister laughs at the new horse and condescendingly tells Jess that there is nothing personal in passing Jess every Sunday (First Day to the Quakers); it is simply an eternal law that a swift horse passes a slow one. Enoch understands what the reverend does not and what Jess is learning: appearances can be deceiving. Jess arranges to leave the children home and drive a lighter rig on First Day. When Godley appears, Lady refuses to be passed and Godley's racing blood is inflamed—as is Eliza's, encouraging Lady to stay in front. Jess' pleasure at "dishing out humble pie" to Godley is dampened when the Bethel congregation pursues them to the Quaker meeting house, mortifying the Quakers and their minister. That evening he recovers when Eliza gently forgives him, but chuckles quietly to himself when he thinks of the sermon that may have been preached that morning at the Bethel Church regarding eternal laws.

=== "Yes, We'll Gather at the River" ===
At suppertime one spring evening eccentric carpenter Old Lafe Millspaugh brings Eliza a gift of eggs—which he will not eat because he considers them nature's perfection—to ingratiate himself into an invitation to supper. When Eliza shows him where to wash, Old Lafe declines, saying that if he so much as touches water, he would experience an irresistible urge to jump in a rain barrel. Jess tells Eliza that she should have called his bluff and devises a stratagem to cure Old Lafe of his fixation once and for all. Jess commissions Old Lafe to install a bathroom in the house, despite Old Lafe's conviction that such is a "carnal room." All is finished except the partition when Jess travels to a nurseryman's meeting, inviting him to stay for supper and "kick up our heels a little" to celebrate. Old Lafe sabotages the project by omitting a door to the room because Jess did not specify one. Upon Jess' return, he realizes the problem, takes charge, and tension again mounts to the point that Jane fears for her father's safety. After they cut an opening, he invites Old Lafe to swim to his heart's content. As they sit down to supper, the family hears Old Lafe singing a hymn and splashing happily.

=== The Meeting House ===
In April Jess sets out to deliver his orders of nursery stock. He fears a cyst on his neck is growing as a fatal cancer and tells Eliza that he intends to take a "last look" at the old meeting house in which his parents worshiped. On the trip, however, he finds his customers likewise afflicted: Jonas Rice has a small child who is dying, old Eli Morningstar is questioning the tenets of his religion for the first time in his life, Dade Devlin has died young and his wife immediately remarried to his hired hand, and the last, Lydia Ann Rivers, is a bedridden young woman whose husband Abel has left her for another woman because she is wasting away with a fever. He cooks for Lydia Ann and stays up all night giving the lonely woman someone to talk to, realizing in the meantime that the "growth" of his cyst was nothing more than his troubled imagination. He returns home without going to the old meeting house, telling Eliza that he realizes he has a meeting house for prayer and learning inside himself.

=== The Vase ===
A heavy rain prevents Jess from working outdoors. In his idleness he notices the seemingly worthless articles Eliza has collected throughout their marriage, wondering what compelled her to do so. One is a damaged globe of a chimney lamp whose history Eliza reflects on during the rain. Part of its rim cracked off when struck by a splatter of cold water when they were newlyweds, and she repaired it with putty. Spellbound by dreams of a lifetime of happiness together, a summer morning inspires 17-year-old Eliza to begin decorating it with swans as a vase. Jess had broken its spell later by asking for his breakfast and she had set it aside unfinished for many years. Then, one November, to console herself after her young daughter Sarah had died, she began working on it again. She had only completed the outline of another swan when Jess, still grieving, came to her for comfort. He chides her for "playing with thy paints" forcing her to set it aside for good, though still incomplete. Yet, it becomes her most treasured link, after a fashion, to her husband.

=== The Illumination ===
Jess is 62 and married to Eliza for 40 years as they prepare for a large supper gathering of neighbors on a day in May to celebrate the first illumination of the gas lighting system Jess has installed in their house. Throughout the day, Jess notices an introspection in Eliza beyond the two worlds of work and love in which she normally lives, wondering if she has lost or gained as she grew older, and reflects on his own place in the world throughout his life. Eliza makes a comment about Steve, the youngest child, that almost implies that he was meant to replace late Sarah's position in the family. Jess concludes that experiencing eternity is best done by sampling as much of life as possible. The illumination and supper are a great success, but the miserly scrounger Eli Whitcomb, as he leaves the extravagance of the Birdwell home to return to the comfort he takes in his hoarded possessions, criticizes Jess for the expense of the illumination. Jess modifies his earlier reflection, realizing that while there are many paths to seeking eternity, tasting it consists of how deep, not how much, one experiences life.

=== Pictures From a Clapboard House ===
Elspeth Bent, daughter of Mattie and Gard, and Jess and Eliza's nine-year-old granddaughter, visits them for Christmas. Her nickname is Aunt Jetty: "Aunt" because "she's serious as an owl" and "Jetty" "because she's so black". All of the Birdwell children have grown up and left the nest, but her Uncle Stephen returns from California to marry his pretty sweetheart Lidy Cinnamond. Elspeth sees that Stephen meant much more to Eliza than her other children. Eliza is unforgiving of the marriage because Lidy is not a Quaker, and when Elspeth innocently discloses that Lidy was courted by neighbor Mel Venters while Stephen was in California, Eliza's attitude hardens. Lidy, aware that she is isolated from the rest of her new family, spends hours by herself but on Christmas Eve secretly sends Elspeth to take a note to her former beau warning him to stay away now that she is a married woman. When Mel takes Elspeth back to the Birdwell home, friends have gathered to shivaree the new couple and he sarcastically and bitterly bids them well. Later that night, Elspeth hears Stephen reassure his parents that he understands Lidy's "wildness" and so is content with it. In her child's eyes, Elspeth sees Lidy as a faithful bride and her uncle as a Christmas angel. The main, though unspoken theme of this short story is a poignant one: the erosion of Quaker values and lifestyle in the younger generation (or at least in Stephen, the favored but spoiled child).

=== Homer and the Lilies ===
Jess has reached eighty, still vigorous, and while fishing befriends a 12-year-old orphan boy, Homer Denham, taken in by the Perkinses, a childless couple who while good people, have no idea how to converse with a child. Jess tells Eliza that Homer reminds him of Josh with his endless questions, but Eliza believes that Homer is like Jess himself when he was young. Jess and Homer become fast friends. Jess spoils the boy and comes to realize that Homer provides Jess with a window to see the world again as he did as a boy, "bright, fresh, abundantly furnished with mysteries." One Saturday in the spring Homer unthinkingly picks Eliza's lilies and is not his usual cheerful self after Jess upbraids him. A week later, following an unexpected winter storm, Jess learns that Homer died in his sleep. Jess finds that he is not sad for either Homer or himself, seeing that Homer gave him another son to love after his own had grown up, and, more importantly, that Homer, with his extraordinary sensitivity and awareness, would have been misunderstood and well-meaningly hindered by others all of his life. But Jess regrets trying to better the boy, a lifelong habit Jess realizes he no longer needs to keep on doing. In the evening after the funeral, Jess has a revelation: "From now on, Eliza, I don't figure there's a thing asked of me but to love my fellow men"

== Notes ==
Footnotes

Citations

== Sources ==
- Farmer, Anne Dahlstrom (1982). Jessamyn West. Boise State University Western Writers Series. Boise, Idaho: Boise State University. ISBN 0884300277. LCCN 82071033.
- West, Jessamyn (1945). The Friendly Persuasion, Harcourt, Inc, New York-San Diego. ISBN 978-0156029094
