= National Register of Historic Places listings in Jefferson County, Indiana =

Location of Jefferson County in Indiana

This is a list of the National Register of Historic Places listings in Jefferson County, Indiana.

This is intended to be a complete list of the properties and districts on the National Register of Historic Places in Jefferson County, Indiana, United States. Latitude and longitude coordinates are provided for many National Register properties and districts; these locations may be seen together in a map.

There are 15 properties and districts listed on the National Register in the county, including four National Historic Landmarks.

Properties and districts located in incorporated areas display the name of the municipality, while properties and districts in unincorporated areas display the name of their civil township. Properties and districts split between multiple jurisdictions display the names of all jurisdictions.

This National Park Service list is complete through NPS recent listings posted May 22, 2026.

== Current listings ==
	Name on the Register	Image	Date listed	Location	City or town	Description
1	Lemuel Allen Farm	Lemuel Allen Farm	June 7, 2016 (#16000334)	3768 E. Pleasant Ridge Rd. 38°45′32″N 85°19′04″W	Madison Township	
2	Beatty-Mouser Farm		May 26, 2026 (#100013067)	91 South County Road 325 West; 38°44′14″N 85°26′50″W	Hanover vicinity	
3	Crawford-Whitehead-Ross House	Crawford-Whitehead-Ross House	November 27, 1992 (#92001648)	510 W. Main St. 38°44′15″N 85°23′06″W	Madison	
4	Crowe-Garritt House	Crowe-Garritt House	November 10, 1980 (#80000041)	172 Crowe St. 38°42′55″N 85°28′16″W	Hanover	
5	Eleutherian College	Eleutherian College	December 15, 1993 (#93001410)	State Road 250 at Lancaster; 38°49′51″N 85°30′59″W	Lancaster Township	
6	Hanover College Historic District	Hanover College Historic District	November 15, 2024 (#100011040)	Roughly bounded by Prospect Street, College Avenue, and Ball Drive; 38°42′44″N 85°27′39″W	Hanover	
7	Thomas A. Hendricks Library	Thomas A. Hendricks Library	February 26, 1982 (#82000043)	College Dr. (Campus Rd.) east of Hanover; 38°42′45″N 85°27′28″W	Hanover Township	
8	Lyman and Asenath Hoyt House	Lyman and Asenath Hoyt House	September 28, 2003 (#03000977)	7147 W. State Road 250 at Lancaster; 38°49′56″N 85°31′14″W	Lancaster Township	
9	Jefferson County Jail	Jefferson County Jail	June 18, 1973 (#73000019)	Courthouse Square; 38°44′09″N 85°22′35″W	Madison	
10	Lanier Mansion	Lanier Mansion	April 19, 1994 (#94001191)	511 W. 1st St. 38°44′07″N 85°23′10″W	Madison	
11	Madison Historic District	Madison Historic District	May 25, 1973 (#73000020)	Roughly bounded by Crooked Creek, Springdale Cemetery, Michigan, New Hill and Telegraph Hill Rds., and the Ohio River; 38°44′10″N 85°22′48″W	Madison	
12	Oakdale School		May 14, 1993 (#93000432)	Morgan Rd., Jefferson Proving Ground; 38°50′24″N 85°25′33″W	Monroe Township	
13	St. Stephen's African Methodist Episcopal Church	St. Stephen's African Methodist Episcopal Church	December 28, 2000 (#00001544)	220 W. Main St. 38°42′53″N 85°28′38″W	Hanover	
14	Charles L. Shrewsbury House	Charles L. Shrewsbury House	April 19, 1994 (#94001190)	301 W. 1st St. 38°44′05″N 85°22′58″W	Madison	An 1840s Greek Revival home designed by celebrated architect Francis Costigan. Tour information is available on Historic Madison Inc.'s website.
15	Mathias Wolf Farm	Mathias Wolf Farm	June 7, 2016 (#16000335)	4137 E. Pleasant Ridge Rd. 38°45′45″N 85°18′38″W	Madison Township	

== See also ==
- List of National Historic Landmarks in Indiana
- National Register of Historic Places listings in Indiana
- Listings in neighboring counties: Carroll (KY), Clark, Jennings, Ripley, Scott, Switzerland, Trimble (KY)
- List of Indiana state historical markers in Jefferson County
