= North Madison =

North Madison may refer to:

- North Madison, Indiana
- North Madison, Ohio
