= Madison Historic District (Madison, Indiana) =

Historic district in Indiana, United States

- U.S. National Register of Historic Places
- U.S. National Historic Landmark District
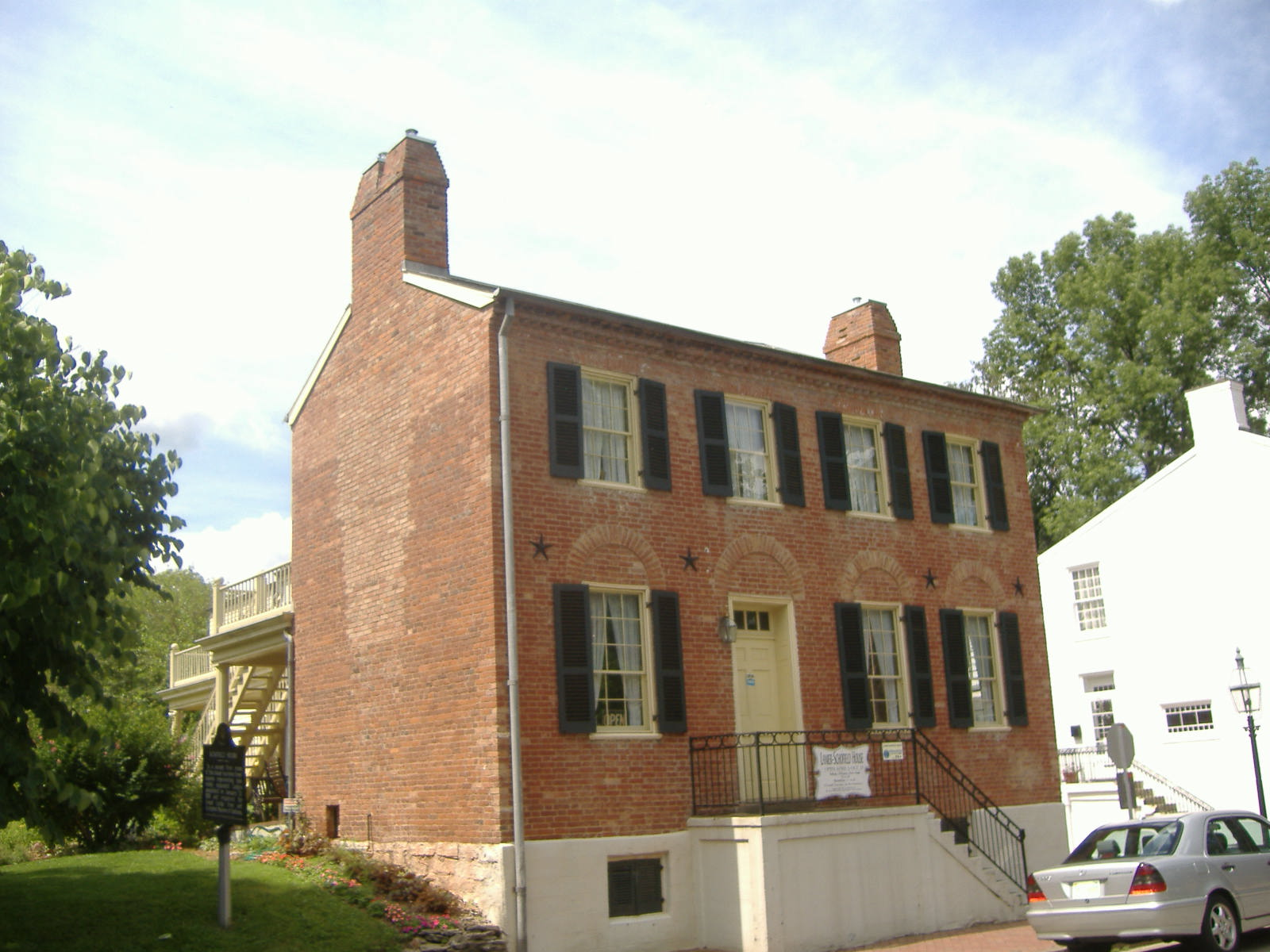
- Schofield House

- Location within Indiana Location within the United States
- Location: Roughly bounded by Crooked Creek, Springdale Cemetery, Michigan, New Hill and Telegraph Hill Rds., and Ohio River, Madison, Indiana
- Coordinates: 38°44′32″N 85°22′38″W
- Area: 2,160 acres (870 ha)
- Architectural style: Greek Revival, Federal, Italianate
- NRHP reference No.: 73000020

Significant dates
- Added to NRHP: May 25, 1973
- Designated NHLD: March 20, 2006

The Madison Historic District is a historic district located in Madison, Indiana, U.S. In 2006, it was named a National Historic Landmark due to its unique Midwestern beauty and architecture scheme. Among the prominent buildings in the district are the Lanier Mansion, one of two buildings separately considered a National Historic Landmark in the district. In total, it comprises 133 blocks of Madison, Indiana, overlooking the Ohio River in Jefferson County, Indiana.

Madison's most prominent days were before 1860. It was a major transportation hub, taking river commerce and shipping it to the inland of Indiana. Once transportation routes changed, Madison faltered until the tourism industry saved it more than a century later.

Many of the prominent buildings in the district were built by Madison-native-architect Francis Costigan, who favored the Greek Revival style. Two of these are National Historic Landmarks: the Lanier Mansion, and the Charles L. Shrewsbury House. The Lanier Mansion was the former home of James Lanier, who lent money to governor Oliver P. Morton to run the Indiana state government to circumvent the legislative process between 1862 and 1865. The Shrewsbury-Windle House was built for steamboat captain Charles Shrewsbury, who would later become a mayor of Madison. Costigan, himself, built his home in the district, and it is considered one of the best uses of a narrow lot by modern architects. A thirty-foot parlor is considered the highlight of the House. All three of these properties are available for tours.

Many other significant buildings exist in the district, such as the Schofield House, the birthplace of the Grand Lodge of Indiana, Dr. Hutching's Office, Saddletree Factory, and the Sullivan House.

Also located in the district is the restored 1895 Railroad Depot and the Jefferson County Historical Society museum. When the Madison & Indianapolis Railroad was first built in 1835, Madison was far bigger than the new state capital of Indianapolis. The railroad was constructed by Irish laborers.

Broadway Fountain was first displayed at the 1876 Centennial Exposition, and then presented to Madison in 1886. The fountain was based on French sculptor Michel Joseph Napoleon Lienard's design for J.V.P. Andre Iron Foundry in Paris. The Broadway Fountain was manufactured by an iron foundry owned by Adrian Janes, who is also responsible for manufacturing the dome of the U.S. Capitol Building. It was recast in bronze and rededicated in 1980. Other versions of the fountain can be found in Poughkeepsie, NY; Cusco, Peru; and Forsyth Park in Savannah, Georgia. The Broadway Fountain is considered the least altered from the original product from called No. 5 in the Illustrated Catalogue of Ornamental Iron Work.

Madison was also a major stop on the Underground Railroad, with many homes in the area having once been used for assisting the escape of slaves. Multiple locations, including the Georgetown Neighborhood within the Madison Historic District, were designated as National Underground Railroad Network to Freedom locations by the National Park Service.

== Gallery ==
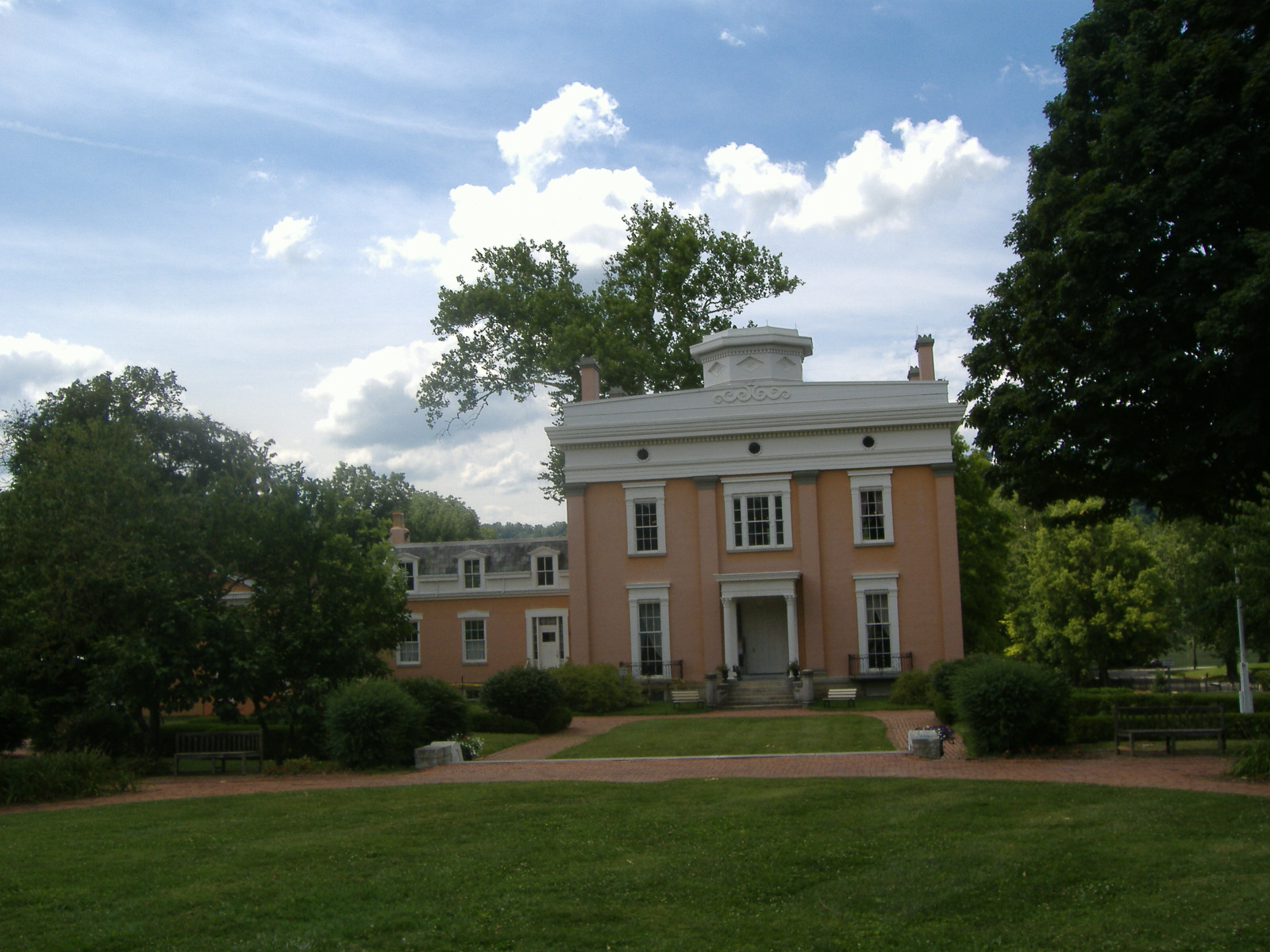
Lanier Mansion

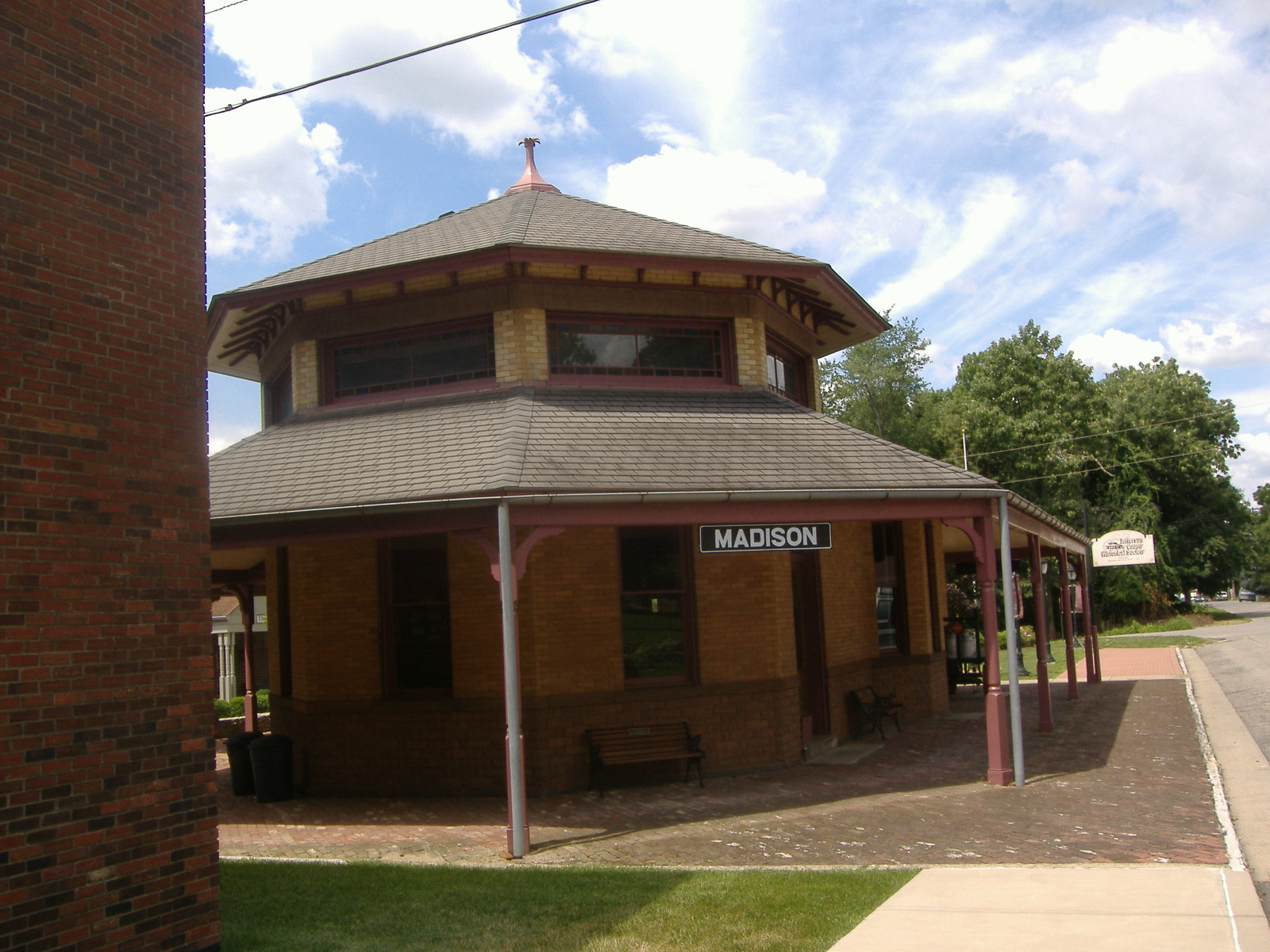
Old Railroad Depot

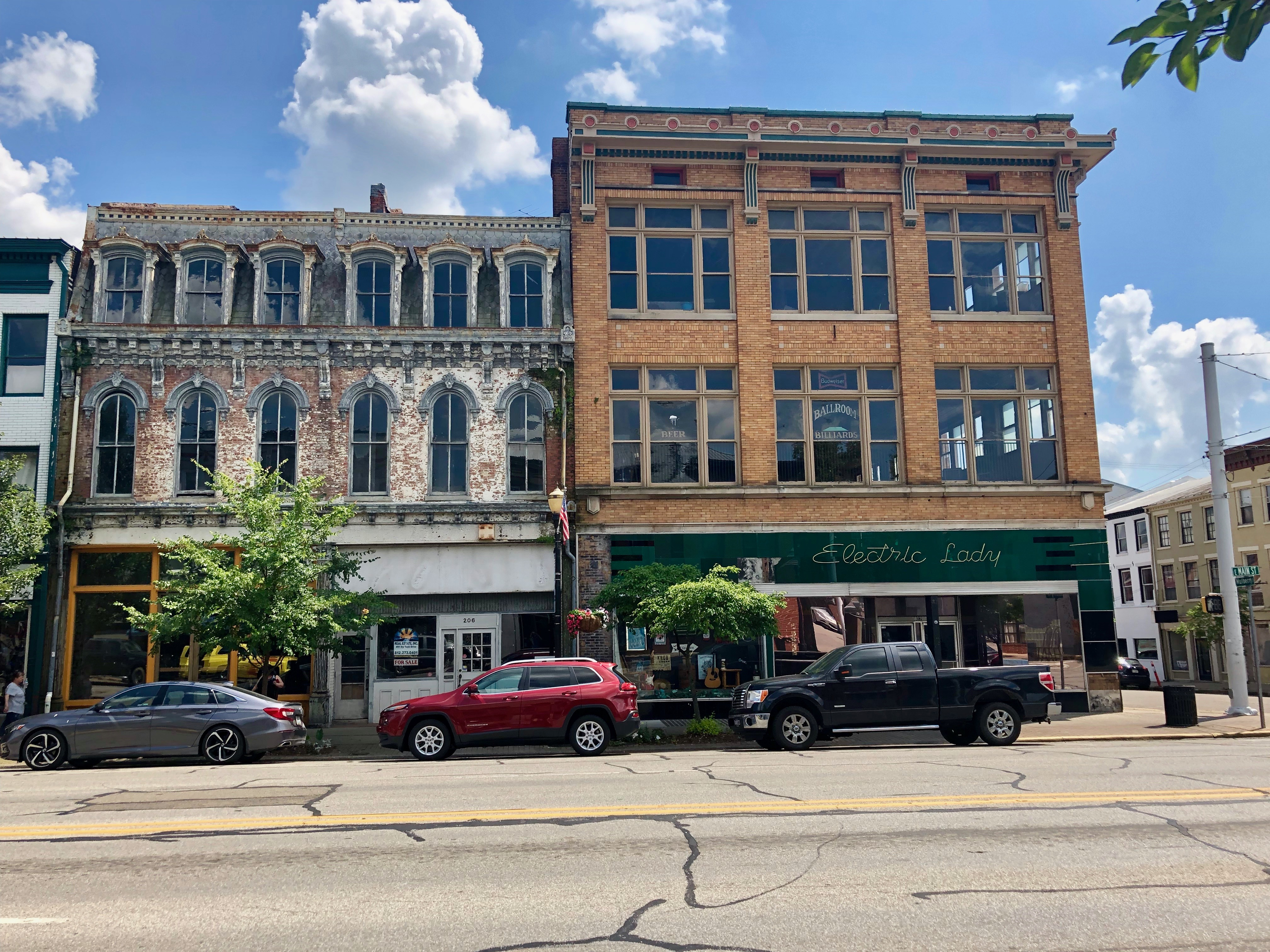
Main Street

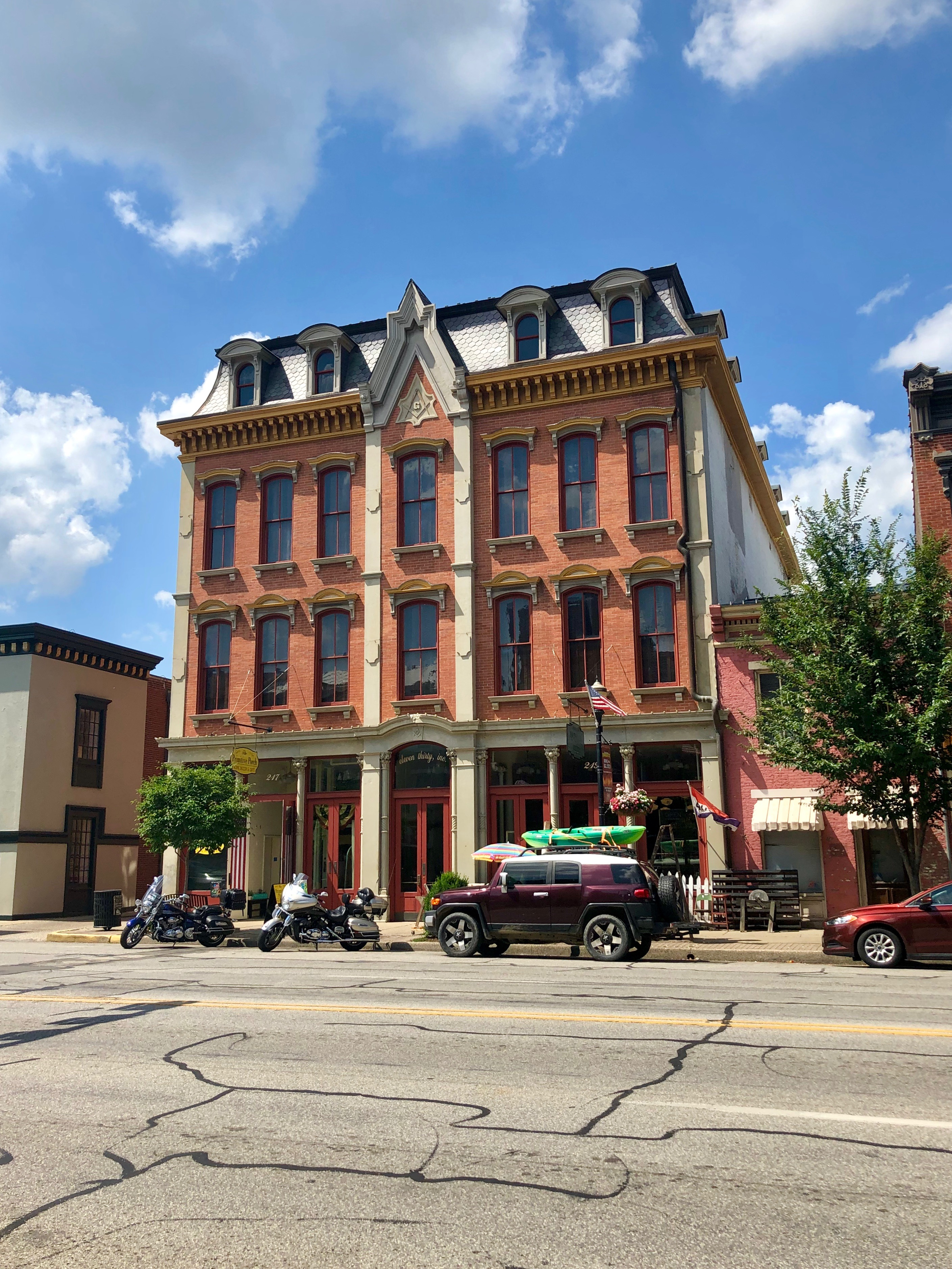
Masonic Lodge

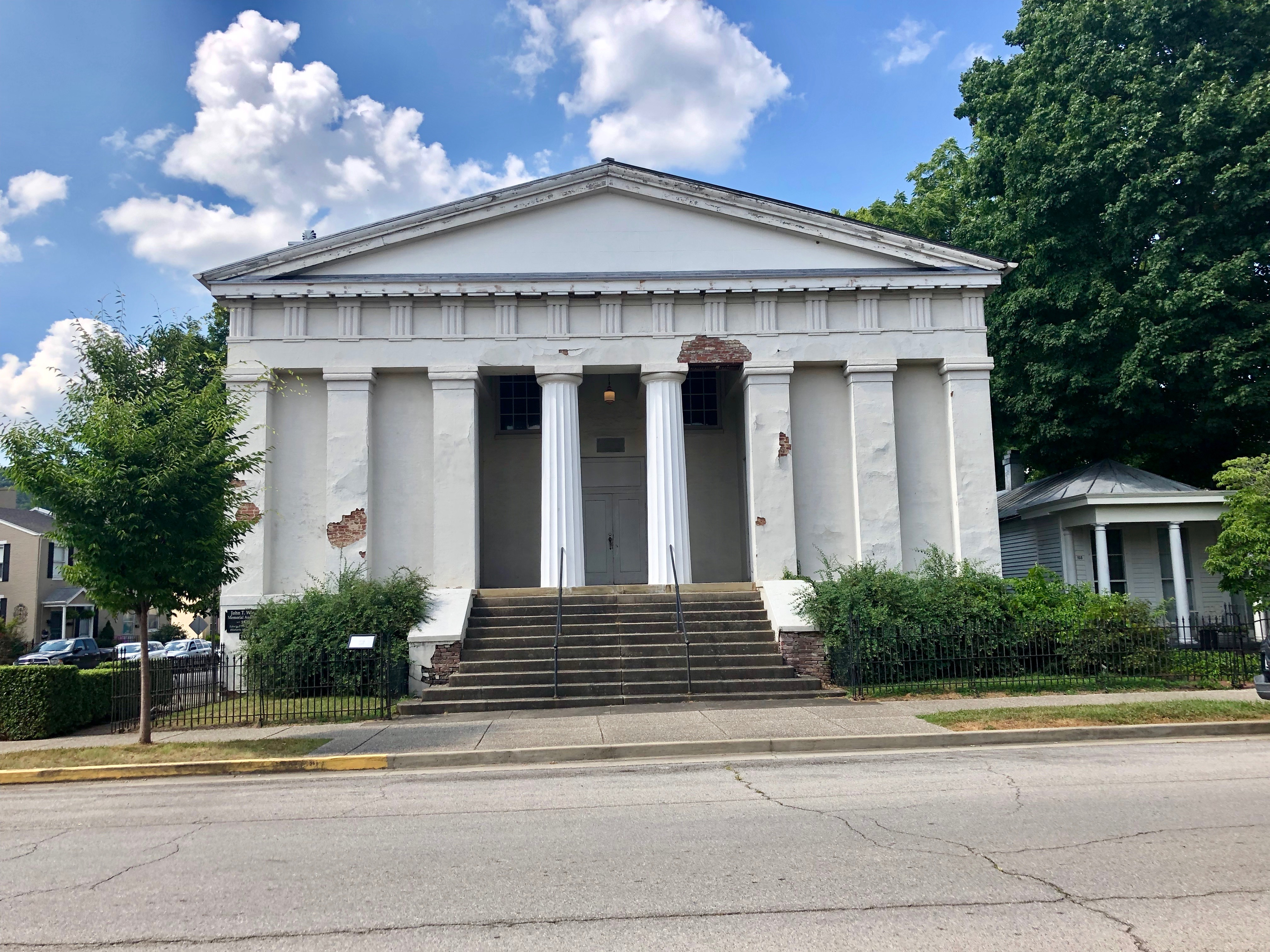
Windle Auditorium

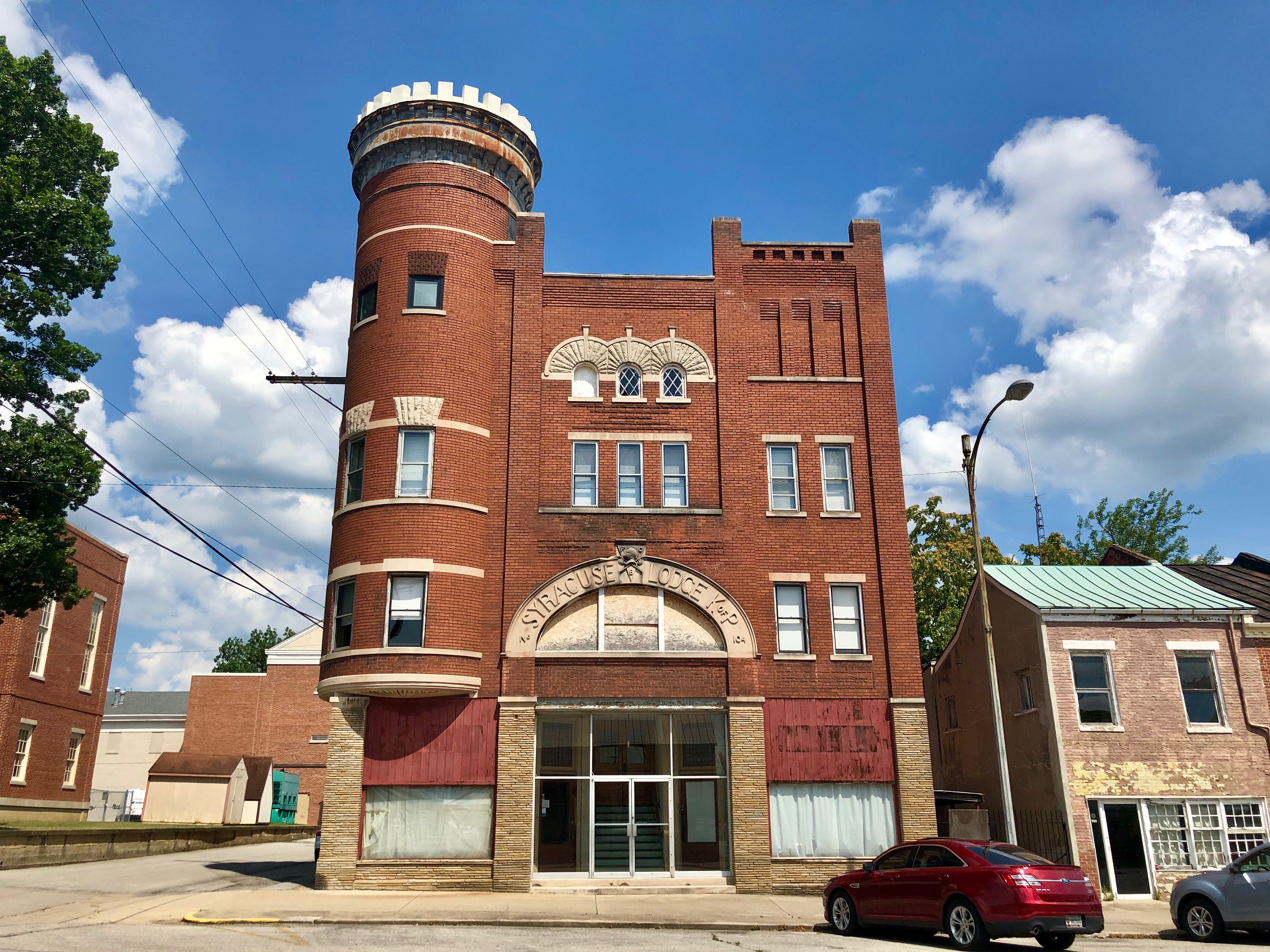
Syracuse Lodge of the K of P, Madison, IN

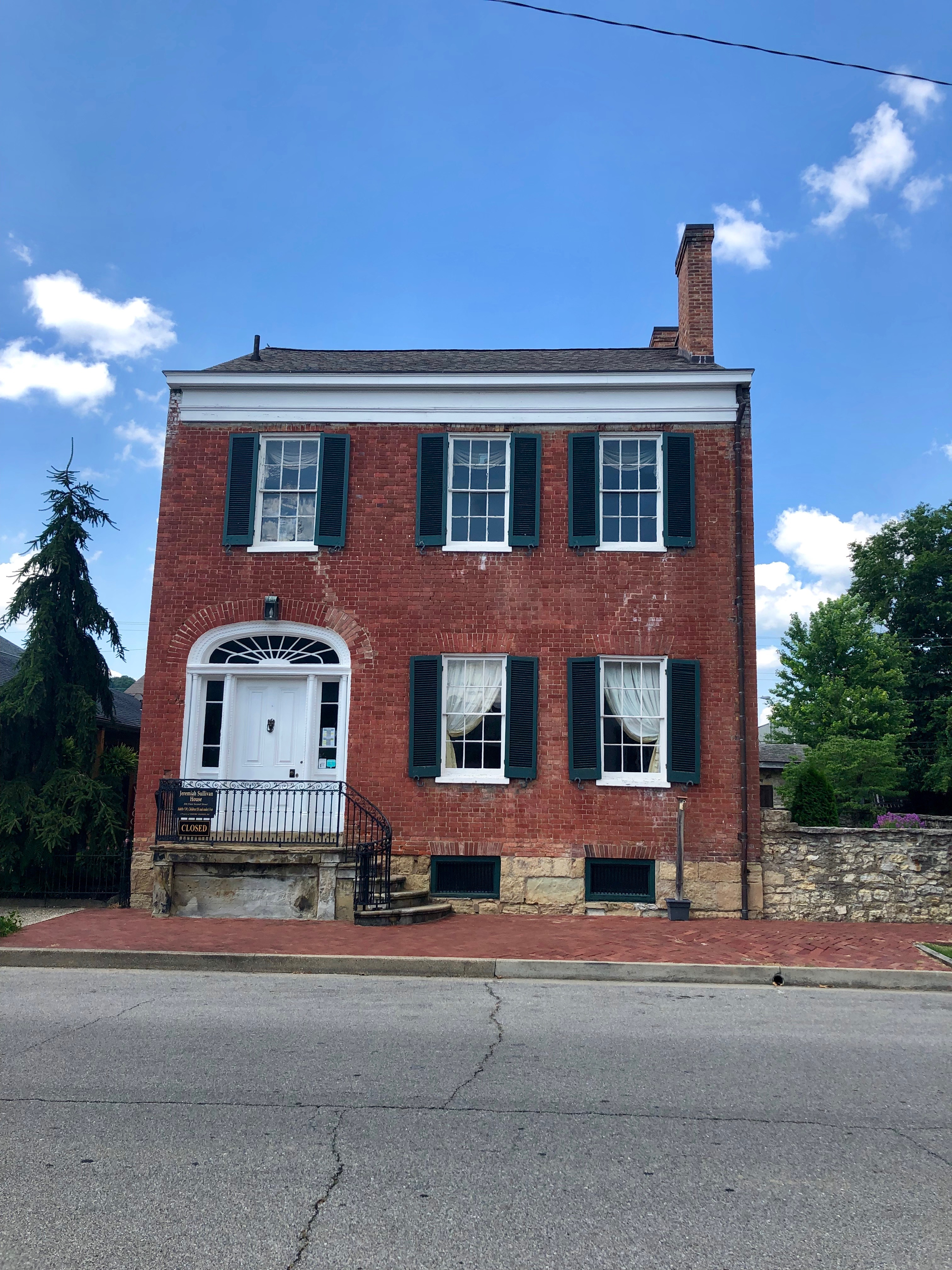
Jeremiah Sullivan House

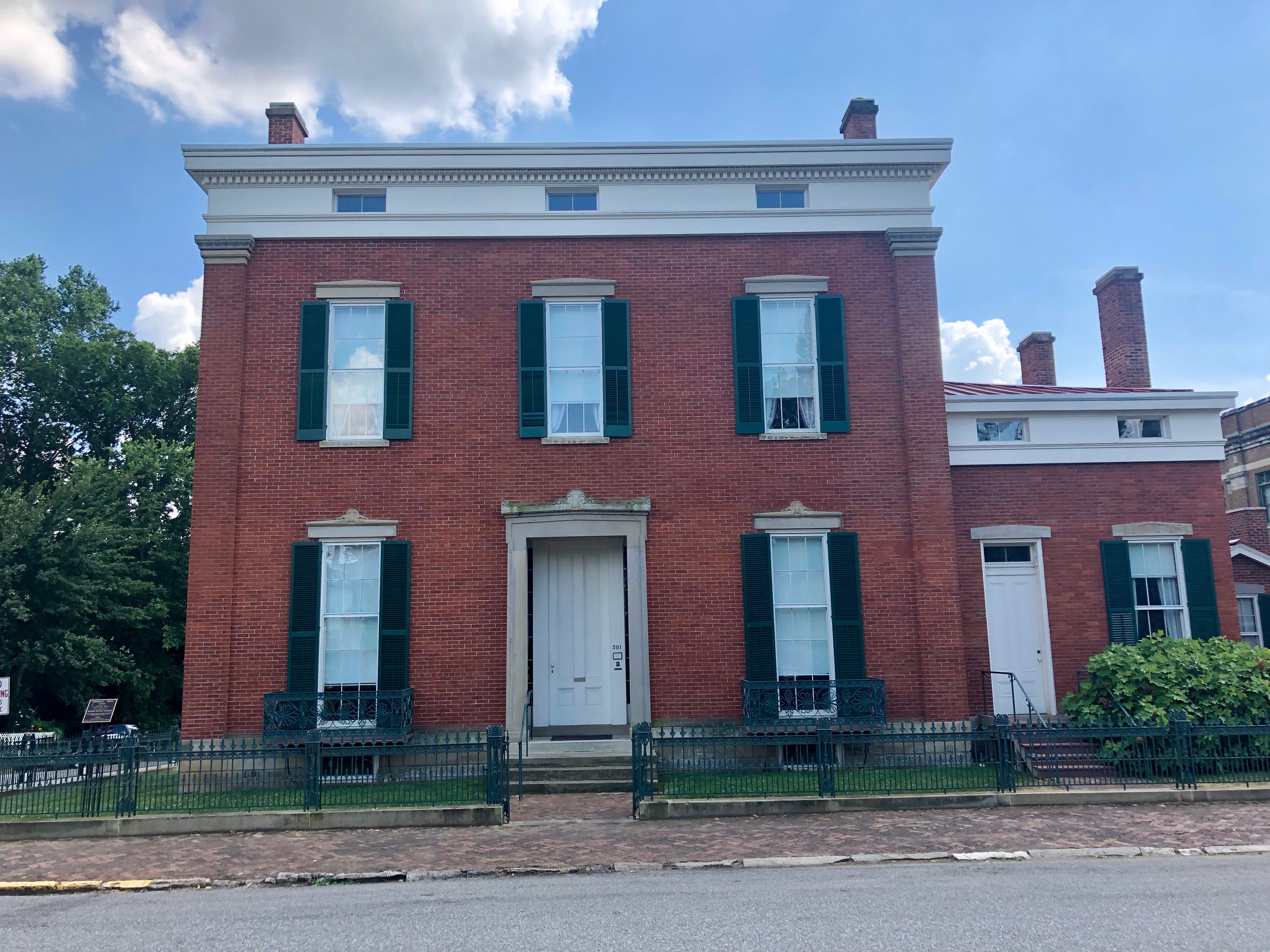
Shrewsbury-Windle House

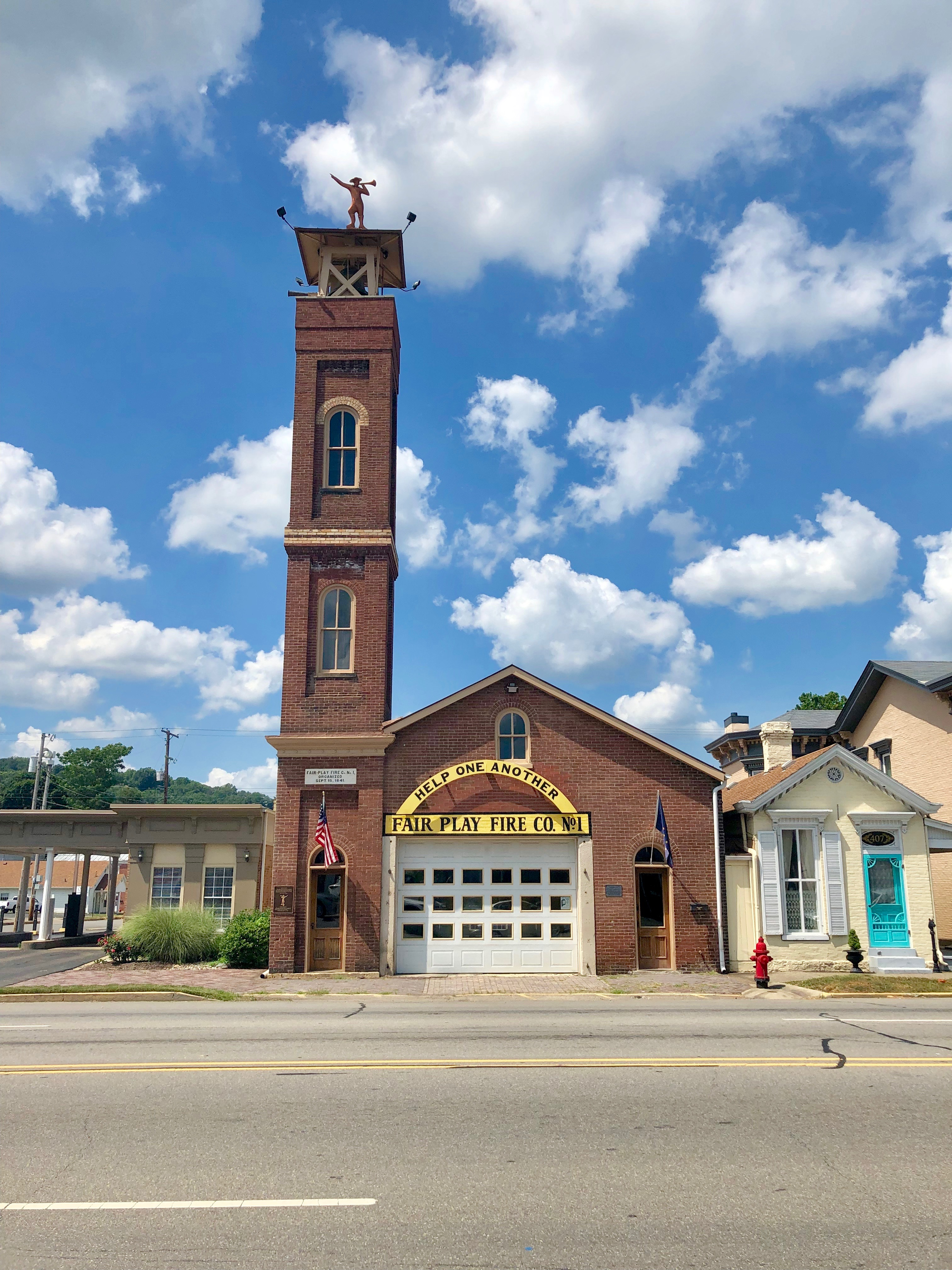
Fair Play Fire Company No. 1

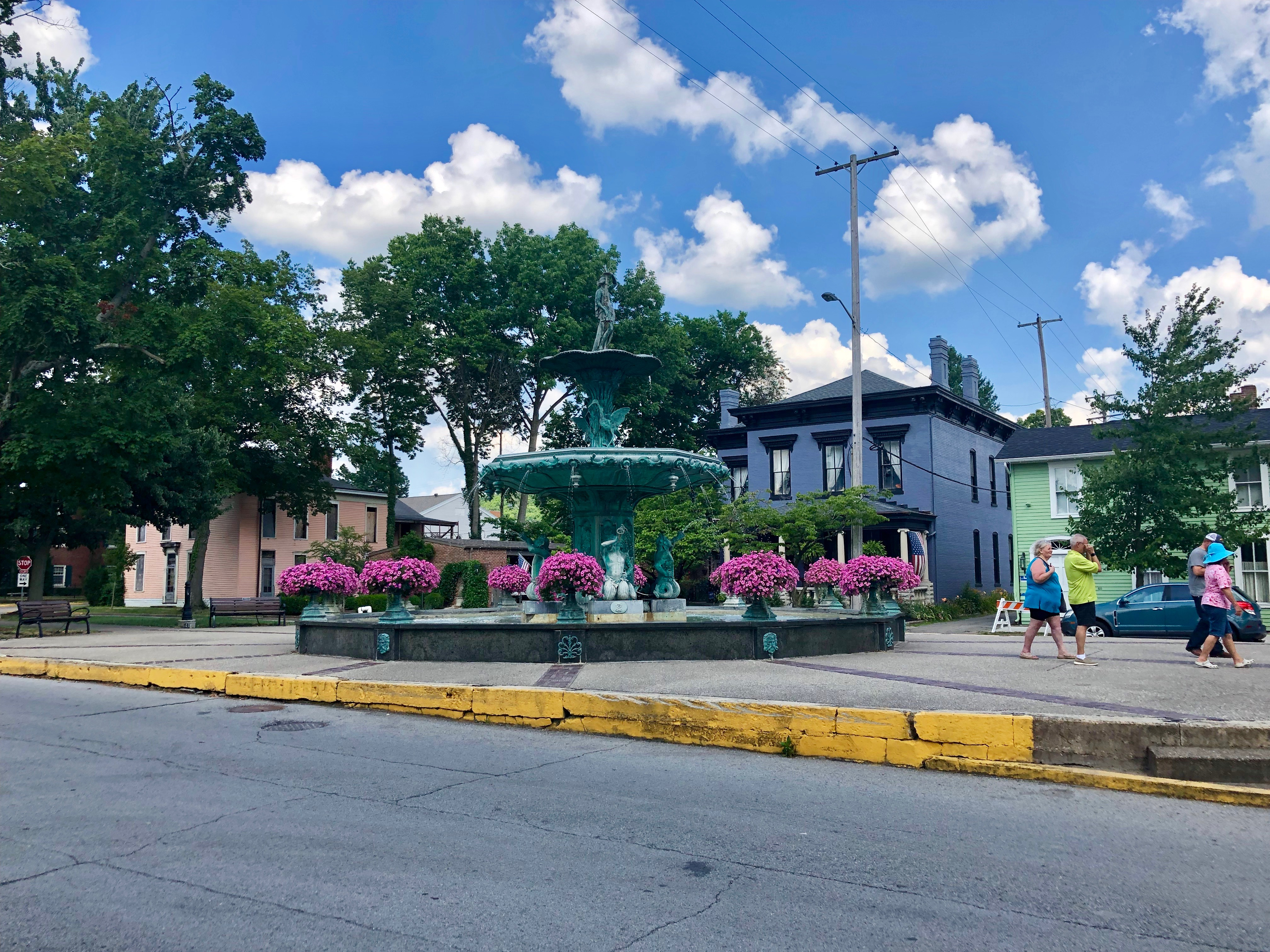
Broadway Fountain

== See also ==
- List of National Historic Landmarks in Indiana
- National Register of Historic Places listings in Jefferson County, Indiana
