= List of National Historic Landmarks in Indiana =

Indiana National Historic Landmarks (clickable map)

National Historic Landmarks in Indiana represent Indiana's history from the Native American era to its early European settlers and motor racing. There are 44 National Historic Landmarks (NHLs) in the state, which are located in 23 of its 92 counties. They illustrate the state's industrial and architectural heritage, as well as battles, circuses, education, and several other topics. One of the NHLs in the state has military significance, fourteen are significant examples of different architectural styles, nine are associated with significant historical figures, and one is an archaeological site. Two NHL properties, both ships that were formerly located in Indiana, were later moved to another state.

The National Historic Landmark Program is administered by the National Park Service, a branch of the Department of the Interior. The National Park Service determines which properties meet NHL criteria and makes nomination recommendations after an owner notification process. The Secretary of the Interior reviews nominations and, based on a set of predetermined criteria, makes a decision on NHL designation or a determination of eligibility for designation. Both public and privately owned properties can be designated as NHLs. This designation provides indirect, partial protection of the historic integrity of the properties via tax incentives, grants, monitoring of threats, and other means. Owners may object to the nomination of the property as an NHL. When this is the case the Secretary of the Interior can only designate a site as eligible for designation.

All NHLs are also included on the National Register of Historic Places (NRHP), a list of historic properties that the National Park Service deems to be worthy of preservation. The primary difference between an NHL and a NRHP listing is that the NHLs are determined to have national significance, while other NRHP properties are deemed significant at the local or state level. The NHLs in Indiana comprise approximately 2% of the 1,656 properties and districts listed on the National Register of Historic Places in Indiana as of December 2009. The landmarks are among the most important nationally recognized historic sites in the state; the George Rogers Clark National Historical Park is one other site that has high designation by the Federal government.

Marion County, the location of the state capital of Indianapolis, has the most NHLs (9), followed by Bartholomew County (7), and Jefferson County (4). Twenty counties have one, while the other 69 counties of Indiana have none. Indiana's first NHL was designated on October 9, 1960. Francis Costigan, William Dentzel, and Eero Saarinen have designed multiple Indiana NHLs.

Eight Historic Landmarks in Indiana are more specifically designated National Historic Landmark Districts, meaning that they cover a large area rather than a single building. The Lanier Mansion and Charles L. Shrewsbury House are within the boundaries of the Madison Historic District.

== Key ==
	National Historic Landmark
^{†}	National Historic Landmark District
^{#}	National Memorial and National Historic Landmark

== National Historical Landmarks ==
	Landmark name	Image	Date designated	Location	County	Description
1	Akima Pinšiwa Awiiki (Chief Jean-Baptiste de Richardville House)	Akima Pinšiwa Awiiki (Chief Jean-Baptiste de Richardville House)	March 2, 2012 (#97000595)	Fort Wayne; 41°01′53″N 85°09′52″W	Allen	This house is a rare surviving example of a treaty house. Built as part of the terms of the 1826 Treaty of Mississinewas between the Miami and the United States, it is associated with Pinšiwa, the akima (civil chief) of the Miami.
2	Allen County Courthouse	Allen County Courthouse	July 31, 2003 (#76000031)	Fort Wayne; 41°04′47″N 85°08′22″W	Allen	A Beaux-Arts-style building that was built in 1902, the Allen County Courthouse is a unique combination of fine art, sculpture, and architecture.
3	Angel Mounds	Angel Mounds	January 29, 1964 (#66000124)	Evansville; 37°56′31″N 87°27′19″W	Warrick, Vanderburgh	From AD 1000 to 1600, a town on this site was home to people of the Middle Mississippian culture. They built many mounds at this 100-acre (0.40 km^{2}) community.
4	Athenæum (Das Deutsche Haus)	Athenæum (Das Deutsche Haus)	October 31, 2016 (#73000032)	Indianapolis; 39°46′24″N 86°09′01″W	Marion	Home of the Normal College of the North American Gymnastic Union for 63 years and the nation’s oldest, continuously active school of physical education.
5^{†}	Auburn Cord Duesenberg Automobile Facility	Auburn Cord Duesenberg Automobile Facility	April 5, 2005 (#78000029)	Auburn; 41°21′21″N 85°03′25″W	DeKalb	The three buildings of the Auburn, Cord, and Duesenberg automobile manufacturing facility represent different stages in automotive development and construction. It is one of the few remaining automobile companies that made hand-assembled rather than mass-produced automobiles. The site includes the Art Deco showroom and administration building, service and new parts department building, and the Cord L-29 building.
6^{†}	Joseph Bailly Homestead	Joseph Bailly Homestead	December 29, 1962 (#66000005)	Porter; 41°37′23″N 87°05′39″W	Porter	Joseph Bailly acquired the Homestead and surrounding lands in 1822 when the Calumet was opened to white settlement. He established a trading post that was a meeting place for both Indians and whites and a stopping place for travelers and missionaries. It is now at the Indiana Dunes National Lakeshore.
7	Broad Ripple Park Carousel	Broad Ripple Park Carousel	February 27, 1987 (#87000839)	Indianapolis; 39°48′39″N 86°09′25″W	Marion	Originally located at Broad Ripple Village, this carousel was brought to Indiana in 1917 and is one of three surviving Dentzel menagerie carousels. Its animals predate 1900 and it is now housed in The Children's Museum of Indianapolis.
8	Duck Creek Aqueduct	Duck Creek Aqueduct	August 25, 2014 (#14000922)	Spanning Duck Creek at Whitewater Canal; 39°26′46″N 85°07′48″W	Franklin	Built in 1846, this is the only surviving covered bridge aqueduct in the United States.
9	Butler Fieldhouse	Butler Fieldhouse	February 27, 1987 (#83003573)	Indianapolis; 39°50′36″N 86°10′02″W	Marion	Located at Butler University and now called Hinkle Fieldhouse, it is the sixth-oldest basketball arena still used and was once the largest in the United States. It hosted the Indiana high school basketball tournament until 1971.
10	Cannelton Cotton Mill	Cannelton Cotton Mill	July 17, 1991 (#75000011)	Cannelton; 37°54′41″N 86°44′44″W	Perry	The Cannelton mill, overlooking the Ohio River, manufactured thread and cloth for over 100 years from 1851 to 1954. Its innovative design used steam power and Southern cotton, and its utility and aesthetics attempted to make Southern Indiana an industrial center.
11	Levi Coffin House	Levi Coffin House	June 23, 1965 (#66000009)	Fountain City; 39°57′23″N 84°55′03″W	Wayne	Levi Coffin lived in this house from 1827 to 1847, where he helped as many as 2,000 slaves escape to freedom. The house was known as the Union Depot of the Underground Railroad, and it contained secret doors that could hide fugitives.
12	Eugene V. Debs Home	Eugene V. Debs Home	November 13, 1966 (#66000008)	Terre Haute; 39°28′18″N 87°24′20″W	Vigo	Eugene V. Debs, founder of Industrial Workers of the World and the American Railway Union, lived in this home from its construction in 1890 until his death in 1926. He ran as a Socialist candidate in the 1900, 1904, 1908, 1912, and 1920 United States presidential elections.
13	Eleutherian College Classroom and Chapel Building	Eleutherian College Classroom and Chapel Building	February 18, 1997 (#93001410)	Lancaster; 38°49′51″N 85°30′59″W	Jefferson	Founded in 1848 by abolitionist Baptist Church members, Eleutherian College was the first college in Indiana to admit students regardless of race or gender. The Chapel building was completed in 1854 and is the last structure remaining.
14	First Baptist Church	First Baptist Church	May 16, 2000 (#00000707)	Columbus; 39°14′01″N 85°52′20″W	Bartholomew	Completed in 1965, the First Baptist Church is an example of modern architecture in Columbus. It was designed by architect Harry Weese.
15	First Christian Church	First Christian Church	January 3, 2001 (#01000067)	Columbus; 39°12′11″N 85°55′08″W	Bartholomew	Designed by Finnish architect Eliel Saarinen in 1942, the First Christian Church was one of the first modern-style churches in America.
16	Fort Ouiatenon Archeological District	Fort Ouiatenon Archeological District	January 13, 2021 (#100006239)	Along River Rd. and the Wabash River, west of the Purdue University Airport; 40°24′23″N 86°57′50″W	Tippecanoe	Archeological site of the first colonial fortification in Indiana
17	Thomas Gaff House (Hillforest)	Thomas Gaff House (Hillforest)	October 5, 1992 (#71000005)	Aurora; 39°03′14″N 84°54′06″W	Dearborn	Located above the Ohio River, Hillforest was built in 1855 in the Italian Renaissance architectural style. Designed by Isaiah Rogers, its full-width frontal porch is reminiscent of a steamboat's deck.
18	Grouseland	Grouseland	December 19, 1960 (#66000018)	Vincennes; 38°41′08″N 87°31′34″W	Knox	Grouseland was the home of William Henry Harrison from 1804 to 1812, while he was Governor of the Indiana Territory. He held conferences there with Native Americans, including Shawnee leader Tecumseh. Harrison later became the 9th President, serving one month in 1841.
19	Benjamin Harrison Presidential Site	Benjamin Harrison Presidential Site	January 29, 1964 (#66000010)	Indianapolis; 39°47′02″N 86°09′15″W	Marion	Benjamin Harrison lived in this Italianate house from 1875 until his death there in 1901, except from 1889 to 1893 while he was the 23rd President. He was also a Senator from Indiana from 1881 to 1887. Harrison accepted the Republican nomination for the Presidential election in 1888 and conducted his Front Porch Campaign here.
20^{†}	Indiana War Memorial Plaza	Indiana War Memorial Plaza	October 11, 1994 (#89001404)	Indianapolis; 39°46′25″N 86°09′25″W	Marion	The Indiana World War Memorial, begun in 1926 and finished in 1965, is a building commemorating World War I and II veterans. It is 210 feet (64 m) tall, made of Indiana limestone, and based on the Mausoleum of Mausolus. Within it is a military museum. The Plaza also includes the American Legion headquarters, Cenotaph square, an obelisk, and fountains. Originally "Indiana World War Memorial Plaza Historic District", it was enlarged and renamed in December 2016.
21^{†}	Indianapolis Motor Speedway	Indianapolis Motor Speedway	February 27, 1987 (#75000044)	Speedway; 39°47′46″N 86°14′05″W	Marion	The Indianapolis Motor Speedway is home to the Indianapolis 500, first held in 1911. The track, built in 1909, is the world's oldest continuously operating automobile race course. The 500 is the largest single-day sporting event in the world in terms of attendance, and with seating of over 250,000, it is also the world's largest sporting facility.
22	Irwin Union Bank and Trust	Irwin Union Bank and Trust	May 16, 2000 (#00000704)	Columbus; 39°12′13″N 85°55′17″W	Bartholomew	Designed by Eero Saarinen in 1954, the Irwin Bank is meant to be welcoming, being the first open bank with glass walls. It has a Miesian glass pavilion and influenced subsequent bank designs.
23	Lanier Mansion	Lanier Mansion	April 19, 1994 (#94001191)	Madison; 38°44′06″N 85°23′14″W	Jefferson	Banker and international financier James Lanier lived in this home, built in the early 1840s, for seven years. It is an example of Greek Revival style from architect Francis Costigan and is now a museum.
24^{#}	Lincoln Boyhood Home	Lincoln Boyhood Home	December 19, 1960 (#66000012)	Lincoln City; 38°07′13″N 86°59′49″W	Spencer	The 16th US President Abraham Lincoln grew up here from 1816 to 1830. The site features the foundation of the original cabin, a replica farm house, the gravesite of Lincoln's mother Nancy Hanks Lincoln, and a memorial building.
25^{†}	Madison Historic District	Madison Historic District	March 20, 2006 (#73000020)	Madison; 38°44′32″N 85°22′38″W	Jefferson	The Madison Historic District showcases architecture from 1817 to 1939, having many buildings in Federal, Greek Revival and Italianate styles. Infrastructure and houses remain from the 19th century, related to leaders of the Underground Railroad.
26	Mabel McDowell Elementary School	Mabel McDowell Elementary School	January 3, 2001 (#01000068)	Columbus; 39°12′07″N 85°53′31″W	Bartholomew	Architect John Carl Warnecke designed this contextual work as part of the movement to improve the quality of life in Columbus through outstanding architecture. This school in the modern style contains five separate one-story buildings linked by landscaped courtyards and covered walkways. Four classroom buildings flank the central hub which contains the cafeteria and administration spaces. It has been converted to an adult education center.
27	Miller House	Miller House	May 16, 2000 (#00000706)	Columbus; 39°13′38″N 85°55′23″W	Bartholomew	Associated with Cummins founder J. Irwin Miller, the Miller House is a work of Eero Saarinen representing International style. The building is integrated with the modern landscape of Dan Kiley.
28	Montgomery County Jail and Sheriff's Residence	Montgomery County Jail and Sheriff's Residence	December 11, 2023 (#100009823)	Crawfordsville; 40°02′38″N 86°54′06″W	Montgomery	
29^{†}	New Harmony Historic District	New Harmony Historic District	June 23, 1965 (#66000006)	New Harmony; 38°07′48″N 87°56′08″W	Posey	New Harmony was founded in 1815 by Rappites, and in 1825 Robert Owen attempted to create a utopian society. Many original Harmony Society buildings remain.
30	North Christian Church	North Christian Church	May 16, 2000 (#00000705)	Columbus; 39°13′48″N 85°54′58″W	Bartholomew	Completed in 1964, this was designed by Finnish architect Eero Saarinen. It has a hexagonal shape with an elevated hexagonal sanctuary in the center and pews surrounding the altar. From the roof rises a 192-foot (59 m) spire and cross, which represents Christianity arising from Judaism.
31^{†}	Oldfields (J. K. Lilly House)	Oldfields (J. K. Lilly House)	July 31, 2003 (#00000676)	Indianapolis; 39°49′42″N 86°11′07″W	Marion	On the grounds of the Indianapolis Museum of Art, Oldfields is a 26-acre (110,000 m^{2}) estate. The 22-room mansion was the home of philanthropist and businessman Josiah K. Lilly Jr. and was designed by Olmsted Brothers.
32	The Republic	The Republic	October 16, 2012 (#12001015)	Columbus; 39°11′59″N 85°55′18″W	Bartholomew	Myron Goldsmith of Skidmore, Owings and Merrill designed the offices of this newspaper publishing house. It is the youngest architectural National Historic Landmark ever designated.
33	James Whitcomb Riley House	James Whitcomb Riley House	December 29, 1962 (#66000799)	Indianapolis; 39°46′20″N 86°08′52″W	Marion	Located in the Lockerbie Square Historic District, this Victorian style building was home to Hoosier Poet James Whitcomb Riley for 23 years.
34	Charles Shrewsbury House	Charles Shrewsbury House	April 19, 1994 (#94001190)	Madison; 38°44′05″N 85°22′58″W	Jefferson	Francis Costigan designed this Classical Revival house for merchant Charles L. Shrewsbury. It was completed in 1849 and is an example of Regency architecture.
35	Spencer Park Dentzel Carousel	Spencer Park Dentzel Carousel	February 27, 1987 (#87000838)	Logansport; 40°45′34″N 86°21′20″W	Cass	This is one of three remaining Dentzel menagerie carousels in good condition. It is also called the Riverside Park Carousel.
36	Clement Studebaker House	Clement Studebaker House	December 22, 1977 (#73000044)	South Bend; 41°40′35″N 86°15′28″W	St. Joseph	Carriagemaker and founder of H & C Studebaker Company Clement Studebaker lived here from 1889 until his death in 1901. In the 1890s the company was the world's largest producer of horse-drawn vehicles. It later converted into an automobile manufacturer. The mansion was named Tippecanoe Place and has been turned into a restaurant.
37	Tippecanoe Battlefield	Tippecanoe Battlefield	October 9, 1960 (#66000013)	Battle Ground; 40°28′08″N 86°50′43″W	Tippecanoe	In the Battle of Tippecanoe on November 7, 1811, Indiana Territory Governor William Henry Harrison and his force of 1,000 men defeated the Shawnee and their leader Tenskwatawa.
38	Samara (John E Christian House)	Samara (John E Christian House)	February 27, 2015 (#92000679)	West Lafayette; 40°26′19″N 86°54′59″W	Tippecanoe	Completed in 1956, Samara is an outstanding and mature example of a Usonian house designed by Frank Lloyd Wright during his late period (1941-59). It is a remarkably complete Usonian design, incorporating more than 40 Wrightian design elements, including character-defining Usonian features such as modular design, indoor-outdoor connections, slab floor construction, flat roofs, and open-plan public spaces conducive to simple living for average middle-class families.
39	Wallace Circus Winter Headquarters	Wallace Circus Winter Headquarters	February 27, 1987 (#87000837)	Peru; 40°45′16″N 86°01′11″W	Miami	This building was used by the Hagenbeck-Wallace Circus, the American Circus Corporation and the Ringling Brothers Circus as a winter headquarters. It is now the Circus Hall of Fame and has many artifacts from classic circuses.
40	General Lew Wallace Study	General Lew Wallace Study	May 11, 1976 (#76000013)	Crawfordsville; 40°02′26″N 86°53′40″W	Montgomery	Lew Wallace was a Civil War general, governor of the New Mexico Territory, and minister to the Ottoman Empire, and he is best known for writing Ben-Hur: A Tale of the Christ. He used this building as his study from 1895 until his death in 1905. Wallace designed it himself, and it is now a museum.
41	Madam C.J. Walker Manufacturing Company	Madam C.J. Walker Manufacturing Company	July 17, 1991 (#80000062)	Indianapolis; 39°46′33″N 86°10′01″W	Marion	Madam C. J. Walker founded a manufacturing company that produced hair care products and cosmetics for Black women, and it was the most successful Black business for years. Finished in 1927, the building also served as a community cultural center. It has since been restored and hosts many performing arts and educational programs.
42	Marie Webster House	Marie Webster House	November 4, 1993 (#92000678)	Marion; 40°33′09″N 85°39′36″W	Grant	This was the home of quilter Marie Webster, who wrote Quilts: Their History and How to Make Them. It is now the home of the Quilters Hall of Fame.
43	West Baden Springs Hotel	West Baden Springs Hotel	February 27, 1987 (#74000016)	West Baden Springs; 38°34′02″N 86°37′05″W	Orange	West Baden Springs has many natural mineral water springs. This hotel was built in 1902, and its 200-foot (61 m) glass dome was once the largest dome in the world.
44	West Union Covered Bridge	West Union Covered Bridge	December 23, 2016 (#100000869)	Montezuma; 39°51′18″N 87°20′09″W	Parke	One of the nation's best-preserved examples of a 19th-century Burr Truss covered bridge.

== National Historic Landmarks formerly in Indiana ==
	Landmark name	Image	Date listed	Locality	County	Description
1	Donald B (Towboat)	Black-and-white photo of long towboat on the water	December 20, 1989	Bellaire	Belmont	The Donald B. was built in 1923 and is the only 1920s unchanged diesel sternwheel towboat left in the United States. It still operates towing barges in the Ohio River. After years of being located near Vevay in Switzerland County, its home port was moved to Bellaire, Ohio in 2012.
2	Milwaukee Clipper (Passenger Steamship)	Starboard side of a gray-white boat with two lifeboats, four decks, and a small smokestack docked on a pier	April 11, 1989	Muskegon	Muskegon	The Milwaukee Clipper was a museum ship at Navy Pier in Chicago, Illinois when declared an NHL. In 1990 it was moved to Hammond, Indiana and in 1997 moved to Muskegon, Michigan.

== See also ==
- List of U.S. National Historic Landmarks by state
- National Register of Historic Places listings in Indiana
- Historic preservation
- List of National Natural Landmarks in Indiana
