= Lanier Mansion =

Historic house in Indiana, United States

- U.S. National Register of Historic Places
- U.S. National Historic Landmark
- U.S. National Historic Landmark District – Contributing property
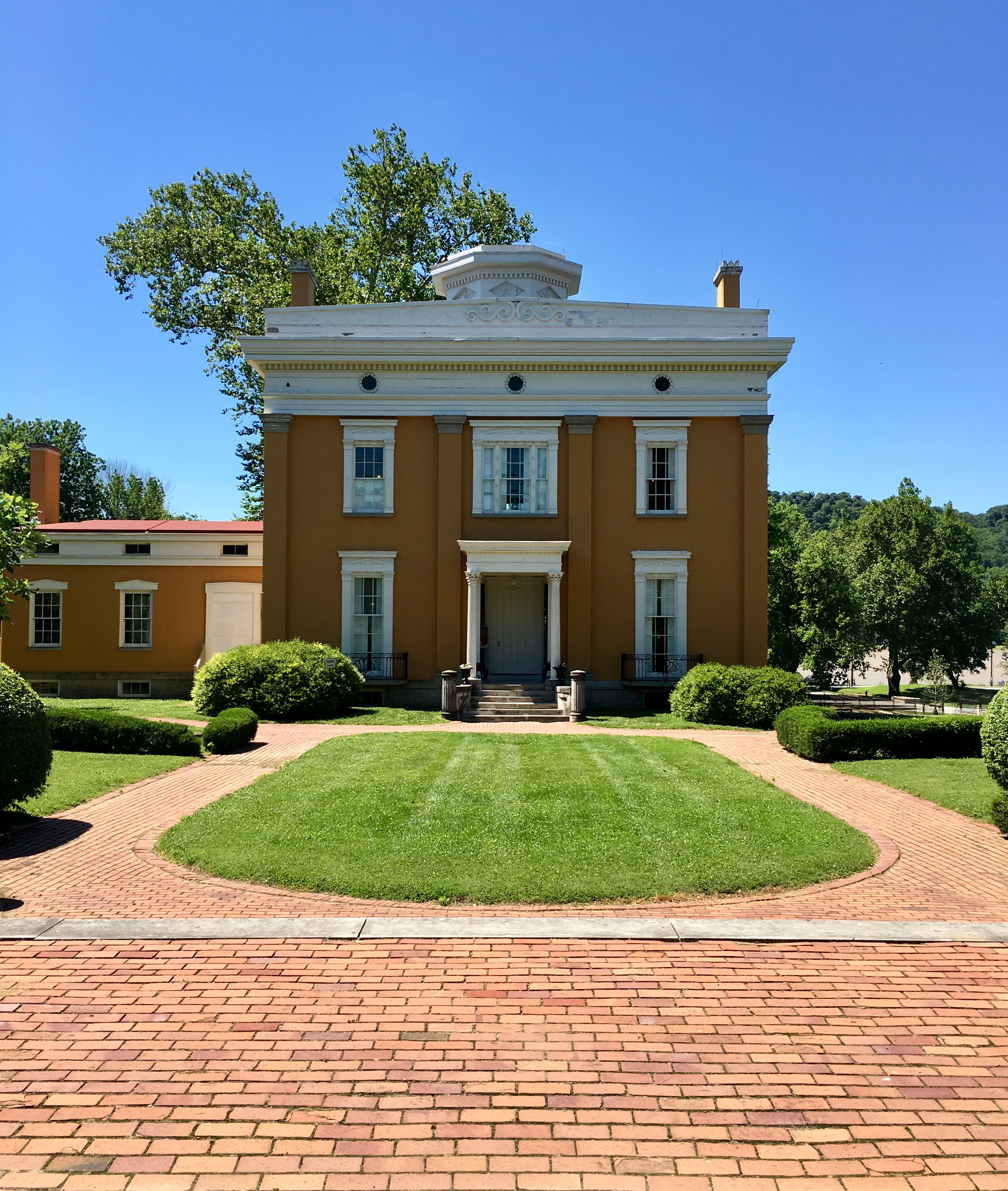

- Location within Indiana Location within the United States
- Location: 601 West First Street, Madison, Indiana
- Coordinates: 38°44′7.2″N 85°23′9.4″W
- Architect: Francis Costigan
- Architectural style: Greek Revival
- Part of: Madison Historic District (ID73000020)
- NRHP reference No.: 94001191

Significant dates
- Added to NRHP: April 19, 1994
- Designated NHL: April 19, 1994
- Designated NHLDCP: May 25, 1973

The Lanier Mansion is a historic house located at 601 West First Street in the Madison Historic District of Madison, Indiana. Built by wealthy banker James F. D. Lanier in 1844, the house was declared a State Memorial in 1926. It was designated a National Historic Landmark in 1994 as one of the nation's finest examples of Greek Revival architecture.

== History ==
James Franklin Doughty Lanier was one of Madison's pioneers moving to the city in 1817 where he later practiced law. In the 1830s, he turned to banking and finance becoming the president of the Madison Branch of the State Bank of Indiana and a major investor in Indiana's first railroad. With his financial success, Lanier commissioned in 1840 prominent local architect Francis Costigan to design and build a residence for the sum of $25,000. Costigan designed the mansion in the Greek Revival style, popular in the mid-19th century, drawing from the pattern books of New York architect Minard Lafever. Construction of the house used materials that were manufactured nearby, or on the premises, including the brick, limestone and timber, largely tulip poplar, that was plentiful in the area. The mansion was completed and occupied in 1844.

Lanier only lived at the property for seven years before moving to New York City where he helped start the investment firm Winslow, Lanier & Co. In 1861, his son Alexander was given the deed to the mansion and moved into the house. Alexander Lanier modernized the house by adding amenities such as a coal furnace, gas lighting, a toilet and bath tubs. Alexander also developed large, elaborate gardens containing two greenhouses that employed several professional gardeners. The mansion would remain within the Lanier family until 1917, when James' youngest son Charles donated the site to the Jefferson County Historical Society. In 1925, the society, with the family's blessing, gave control of it to the state, which promptly opened it publicly as a historic house museum.

Since the 1990s, archaeologists and historians have worked at the site with much of the research funded by The National Society of the Colonial Dames of America and other grants. Their work has helped with the ongoing restoration of the mansion to its appearance in 1844. Archaeologists have discovered the locations of the former dog kennels, poultry house, greenhouses, cisterns, the original Lanier home (which faced Elm Street) and the carriage house, which was reconstructed in 2003 on the original foundation.

== Architecture ==
The Lanier Mansion is sited on the sloping banks of the Ohio River with views of the hills of Kentucky across the river. Built in the Greek Revival style, the layout of the main block of the house is a near perfect square of approximately 54 feet (20 m) by 53 feet (20 m), with a service wing projecting from the east side that extends the facade by 36 feet (10 m). The house encompasses approximately 13,500 square feet (1,250 m^{2}), with just under 9,900 square feet (920 m^{2}) of livable space.

=== Exterior ===
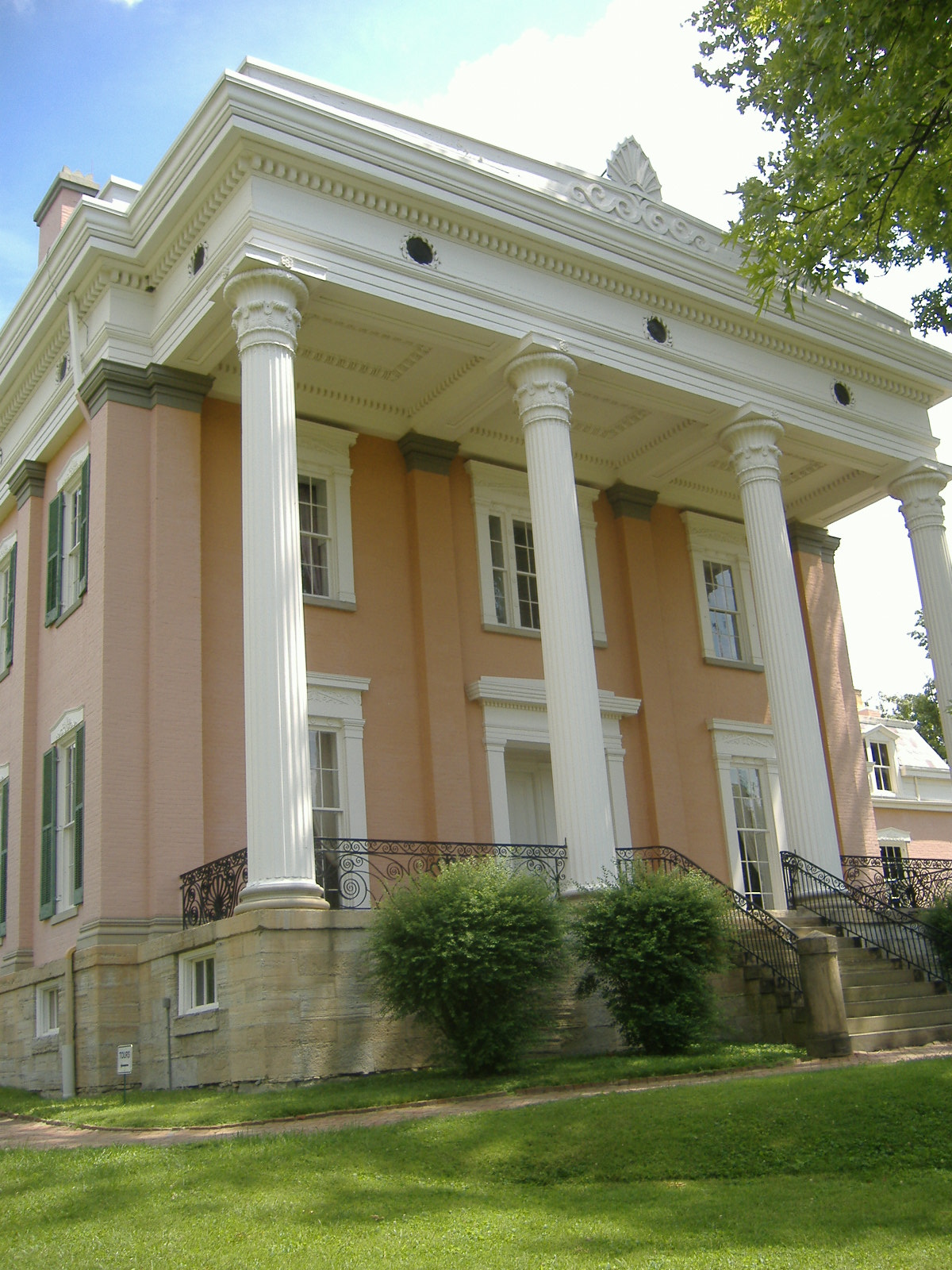
River front of mansion

There is no distinct entrance facade, as the house has a city front and a river front, with the latter being the most ornate. Built on a raised blue limestone foundation, the house is built of brick, painted a yellow ochre and trimmed in white. The southern river front features a two-story portico that extends the length of the facade, enclosed with ornate iron railings, and supported by four 30-foot fluted wooden columns with carved Corinthian capitals. The capitals, designed in a motif of rosettes and scrolled acanthus leaves, support an essentially Ionic entablature of architrave and frieze, pierced by three circular windows framed by a ring of leaves, separated by a projecting fillet and a simply molded denticulated cornice. A plain wooden parapet showcasing a decorative scroll ornament encompasses the low-hipped gabled roof that is crowned by an octagonal shaped cupola. The cupola has a wide eave overhang and is adorned with leaf-and-scroll decorative brackets and a string of dentils. Each side is embellished with a recessed diamond panel with a five-pointed star in the center. The exterior of the three bay facade features four Ionic engaged columns that correspond with the fluted columns of the portico. These engaged columns continue to encircle all but the east wing of the house. The center bay features a recessed paneled doorway with full length side lights, and framed with a classical surround of pilasters supporting a molded entablature. Above is a tripartite window with a plain surround. Flanking the central bay are full length six-over-nine double-hung sash windows, framed by wooden pilasters, stone sills, and a frieze ornamented with carved wooden rosettes and a scrolled fan-and-leaf motif on the first level; while the second level has six-over-six double-hung sash windows, and are framed in a similar manner as below.

Due to the sloping nature of the site, the raised foundation is not as pronounced on the northern, city front elevation as opposed to the southern facade. The city front elevation mimics the southern front in regards to window, door placement and trim, but instead of an ornate two-story portico there is only a central one-story portico supported by a pair of fluted Corinthian columns, and plain squared pilasters that surrounds the entrance, flanked by wrought iron balconies under the respective lower windows. The eastern service wing is also 3 bays wide, asymmetrically arranged with two six-over-six double-hung sash windows and a paneled service entrance to the right. The wing continues the Ionic entablature of architrave and frieze that is pierced by three small rectangular windows. On the southern front, the service wing features two six-over-six double-hung sash windows.

=== Interior ===
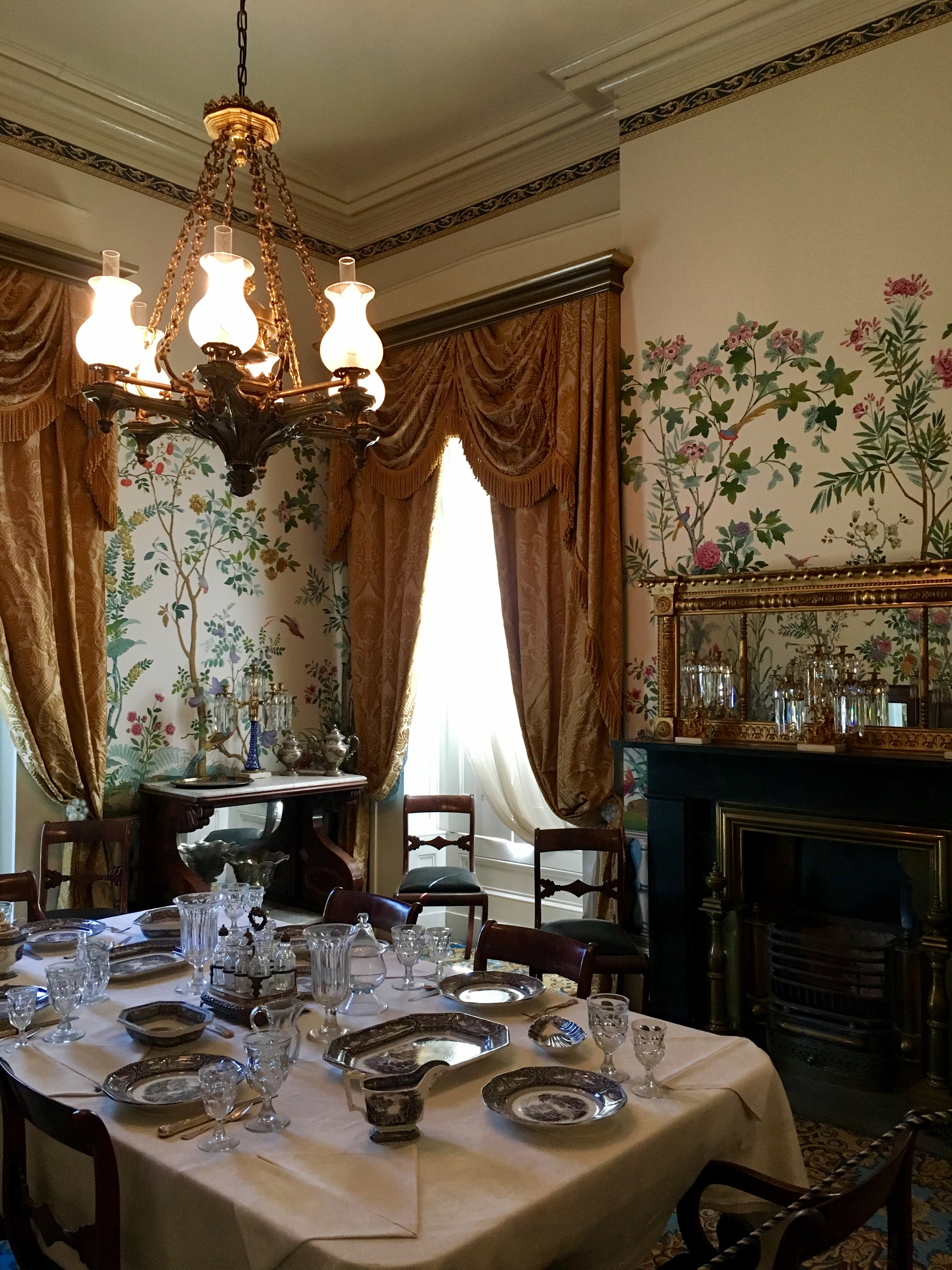
Lanier Mansion dining room

The interior of the mansion features a center-hall floorplan, with a 10 feet (3.0 m) wide formal entrance hall running north to south, with two rooms on each side of the hall. On the first floor there are double parlors to the west, and on the east are the dining room and library. The adjacent parlors are largely furnished as one, with twin black marble fireplaces, gilded mantel mirrors and chandeliers that hang from the 14 feet (4.3 m) high ceilings. The wide doorway, that can be closed off as needed, between the two rooms is ornately trimmed with fluted Ionic columns and an entablature with egg-and-dart molding. The same egg-and-dart molding can be found articulating the ceiling as well. An unusual feature found in both parlors, as a result of the mansion being built in the strict accordance to Greek Revival style of architecture, are the pair of doors found on the east side of the rooms. One of the doors opens only into a wall; this was necessary so that the entrance door from the hall would have a match. The library with its highly stylized decorative ceiling done in gold leaf, deep red and blue, is separated from the dining room by a passageway that leads to the service wing. The dining room features a botanical wallpaper from the French manufacturer Zuber, that uses a technique called British Transfer, where each color in the pattern is separately stamped onto the paper. The chandelier is adorned with Bacchus, the Greek god of wine. The service wing is divided into two nearly square rooms: the service room and kitchen.

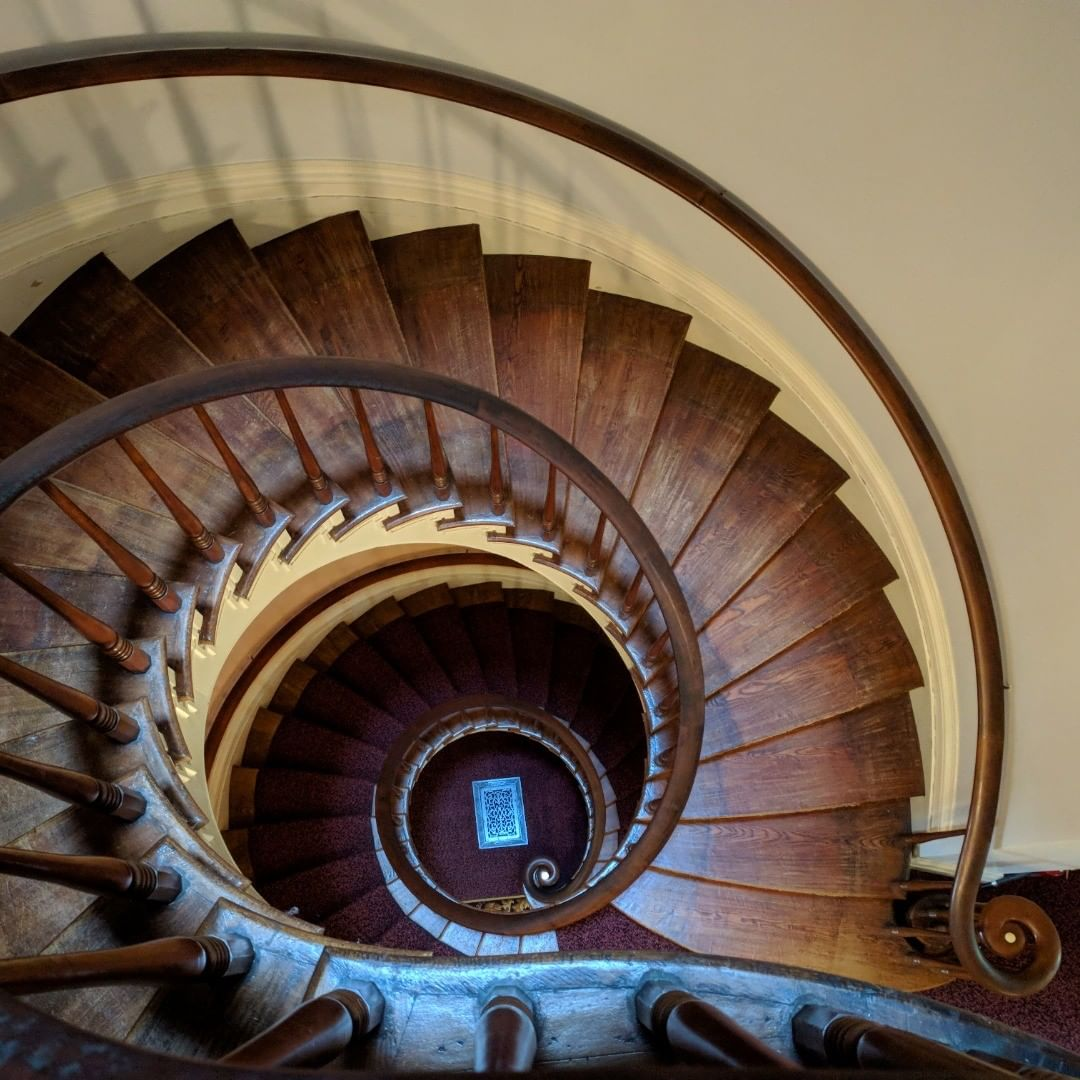
Stairs inside Lanier Mansion

The upper stories are accessed by a self-supporting staircase, trimmed with a Greek key design, found at the midpoint of the entrance hall that corkscrews up to the cupola. The cupola provides natural light to the center of the house via a skylight. The second floor plan of the main block of the house, corresponds to the layout of the lower level, with bedrooms in the four corners. However, two small rooms are found at each end of the central hall, a study on the north end, and a nursery on the south that connects to the bedroom in the southeast corner. The private quarters of the family are less ornate than the main level, and the ceiling height decreases to 12 feet (3.7 m). The servants wing houses an additional bedroom and bath, a servant's bedroom, and a stairway to the first level. The third floor, plainly decorated and with ceilings just over 6 feet (1.8 m), housed smaller children, additional servants quarters and storage space.

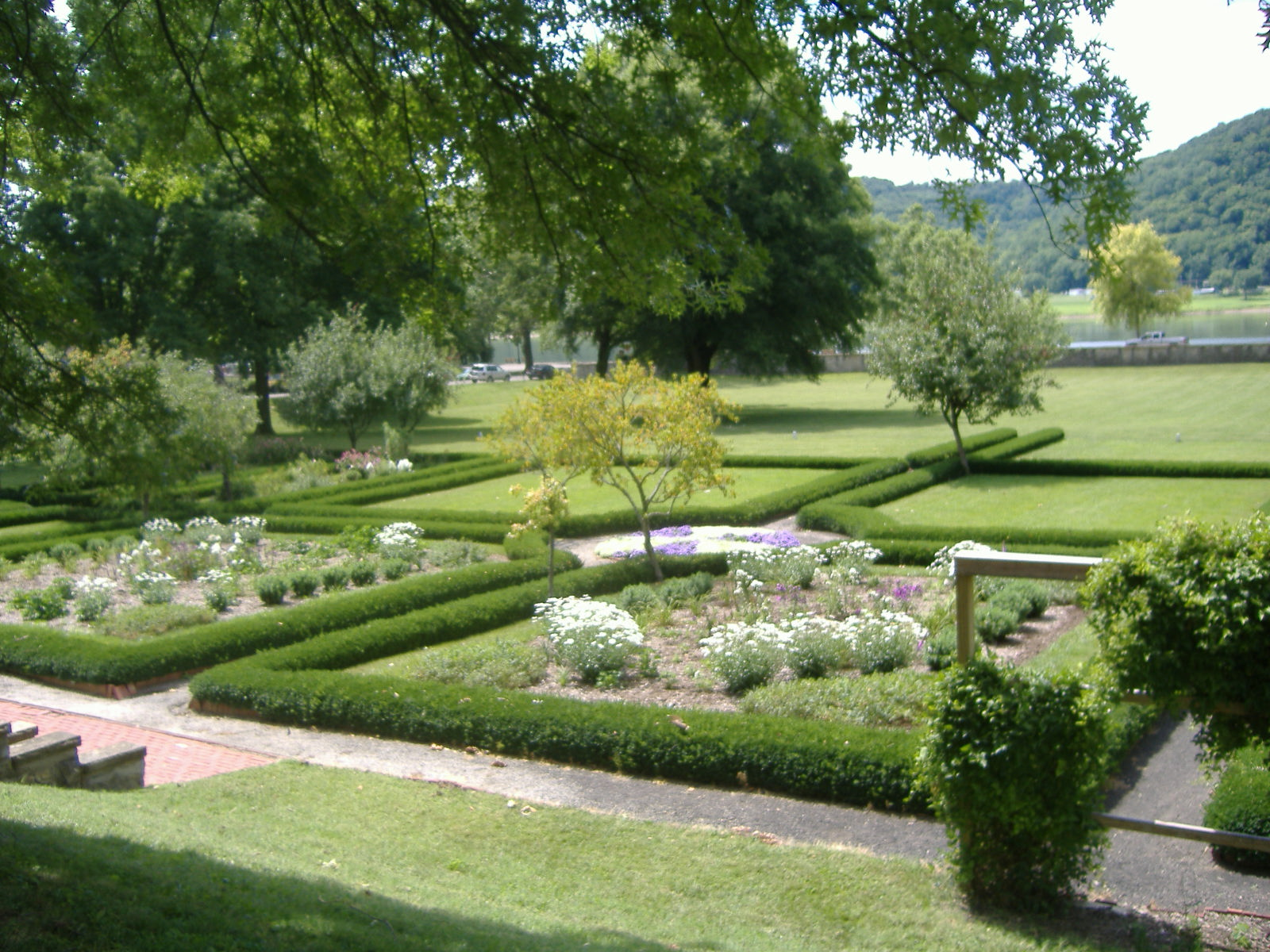
The Lower Terrace

== Grounds ==
The Lanier Mansion sits on a large rectangular lot encompassing 10 acres (0.040 km^{2}) within the city of Madison. Bounded by West 2nd Street on the north, West Vaughan Street on the south and Elm and Vine Street on the east and west. The grounds and gardens of the mansion were developed by Alexander Lanier, the son of J.F.D. Lanier, and included the construction of several stately greenhouses in the late 19th century. Unfortunately time and neglect caused the landscape to be abandoned and totally erased once flooding deposited silt a foot deep. Today, the historical recreation of the gardens are based on an 1876 lithograph of the site. The modern landscape consists of four areas: Craven Square, the Upper Terrace, the Lower Terrace and Pasture. Craven Square located opposite the northern elevation of the house was not originally part of the grounds, as the land was donated to the site in 1944. The city closed the portion of First Street directly in front of the house, so the grounds continue uninterrupted for a city block. Craven Square features curving brick walkways and a lush landscape of flowering trees, shrubs and annuals. The Upper Terrace has a walled sunken garden constructed in 1928, while the Lower Terrace directly in front of the south elevation of the house features the recreated formal gardens of geometric parterres enclosed by hedges of boxwood and gravel paths. Beyond the formal gardens is the pasture with views of the Ohio River.

== Gallery ==
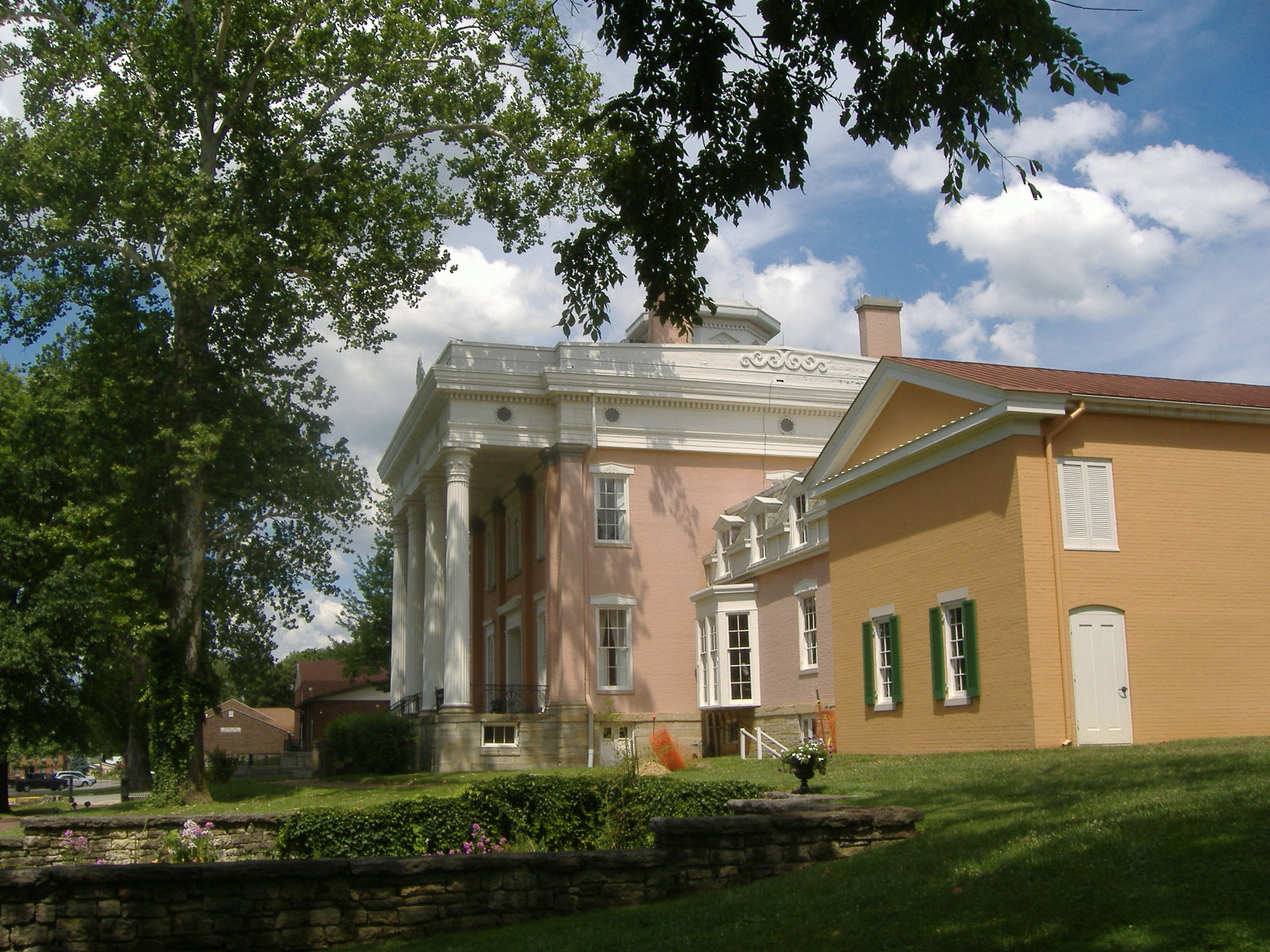
East view of mansion

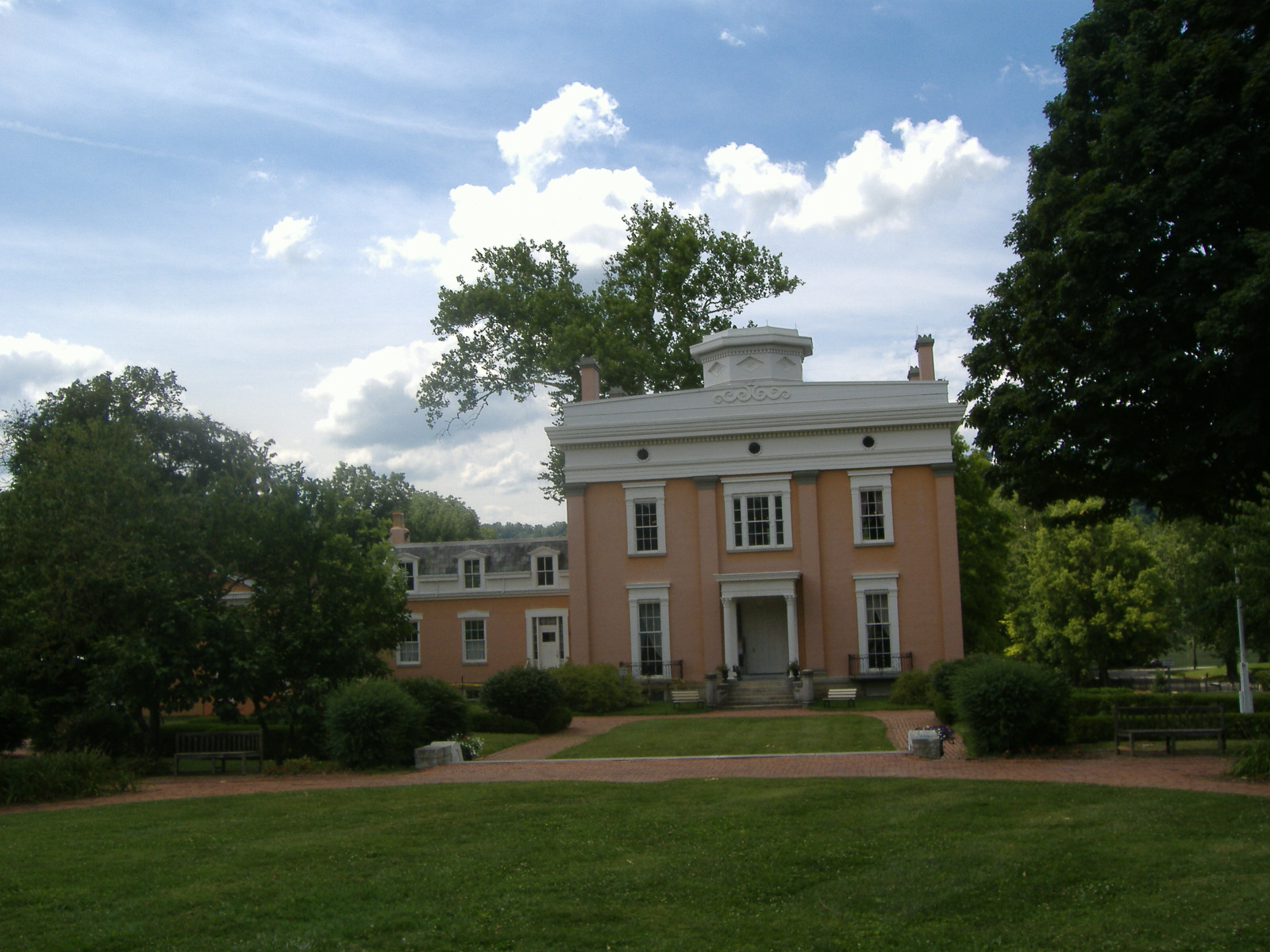
North view of mansion

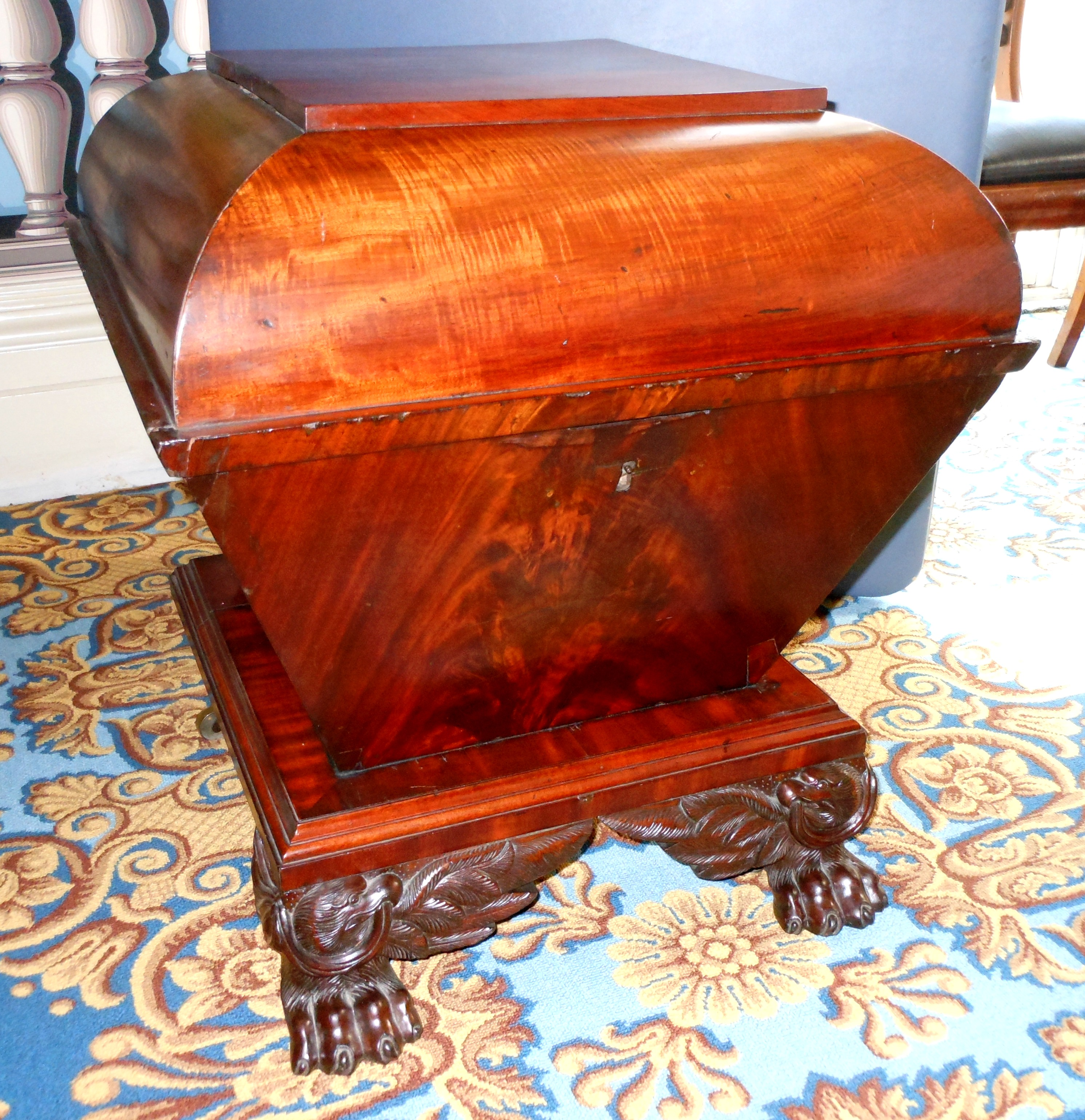
Antique cellarette "sarcophagus" style

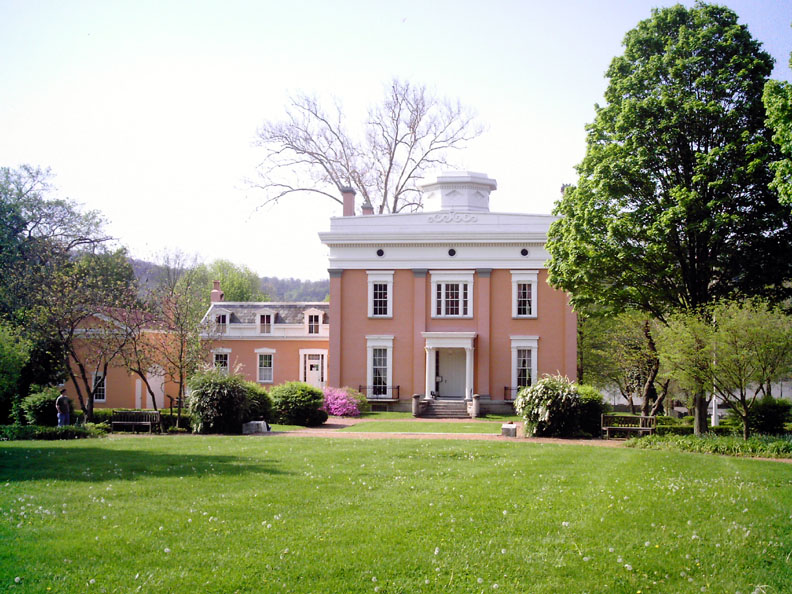
North view of mansion

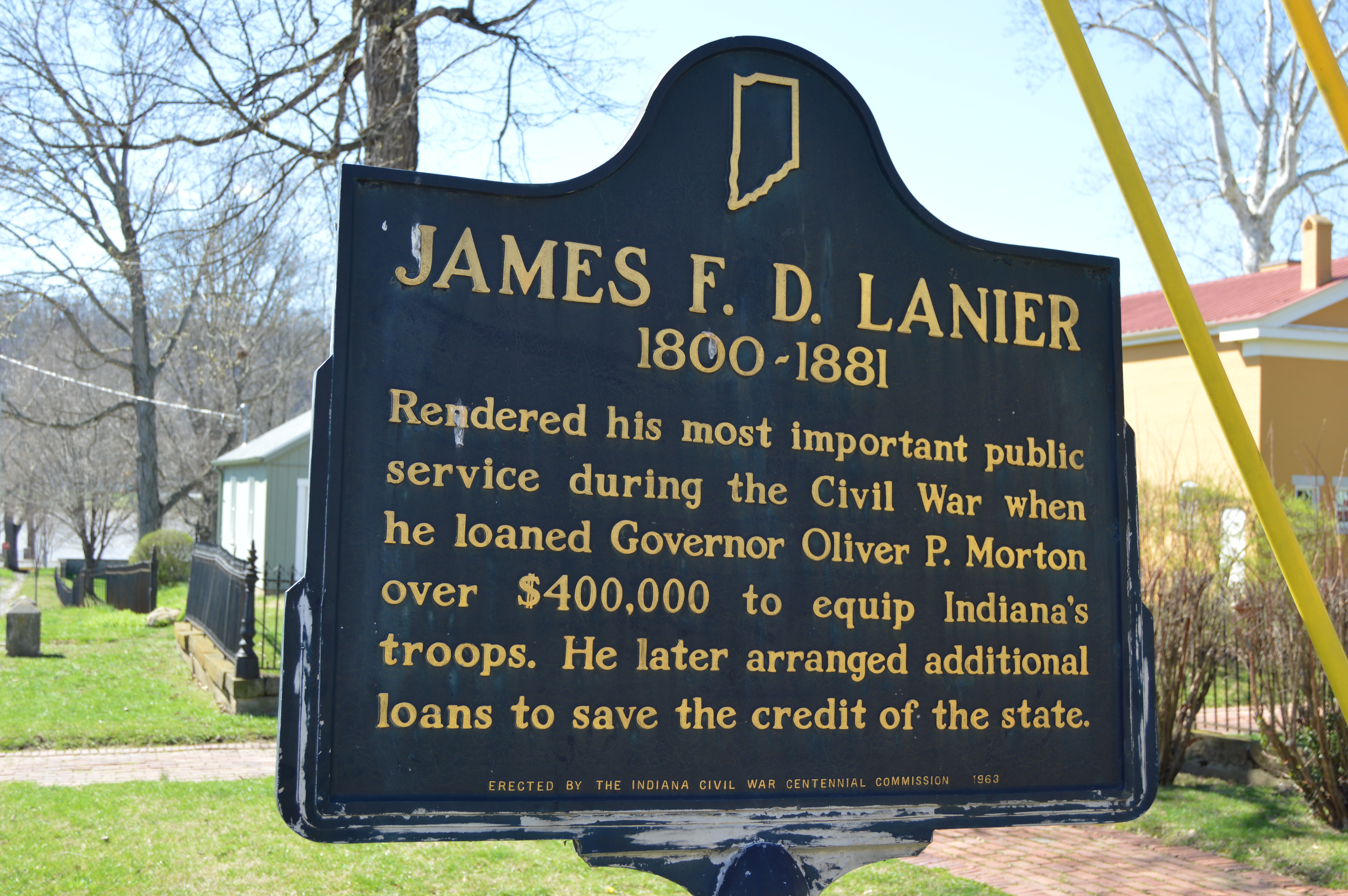
Historical marker on the grounds of the Lanier Mansion

== See also ==
- List of museums in Indiana
- List of National Historic Landmarks in Indiana
- National Register of Historic Places listings in Jefferson County, Indiana
