= Charles L. Shrewsbury House =

Historic house in Indiana, United States

- U.S. National Register of Historic Places
- U.S. National Historic Landmark
- U.S. National Historic Landmark District – Contributing property
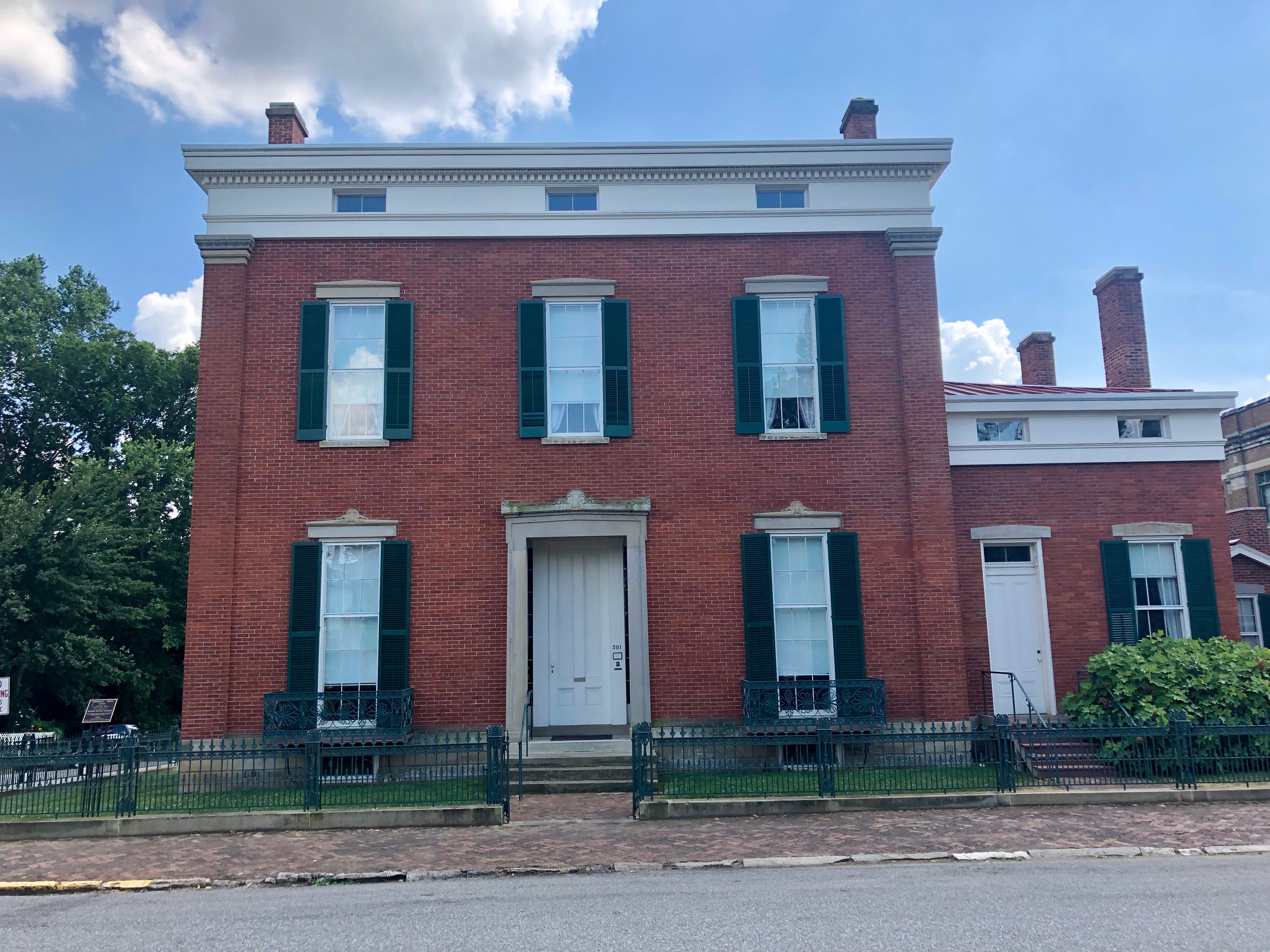
- Principal Facade

- Location within Indiana Location within the United States
- Location: 301 W. 1st St., Madison, Indiana
- Coordinates: 38°44′5″N 85°22′58″W
- Area: less than one acre
- Architect: Francis Costigan
- Architectural style: Greek Revival
- Part of: Madison Historic District (ID73000020)
- NRHP reference No.: 94001190

Significant dates
- Added to NRHP: April 19, 1994
- Designated NHL: April 19, 1994
- Designated NHLDCP: May 25, 1973

The Charles L. Shrewsbury House (also known as the Shrewsbury–Windle House) is a historic house museum located at 301 West First Street in Madison, Indiana. Built in 1849 to a design by Francis Costigan, it was designated a National Historic Landmark in 1994 for its fine Classical Revival architecture. It is located in the Madison Historic District.

== History ==
The Charles Shrewsbury House, also known as the Shrewsbury–Windle House, is the 1848 Greek Revival home of Charles Shrewsbury, a salt-barge riverboat agent, flour manufacturer and pork merchant. Shrewsbury was also the mayor of Madison. The house was designed by Francis Costigan. The Shrewsbury house is a two-story brick building, with a symmetrical 3-bay facade and stone trim details. The building corners feature brick pilasters rising to stone capitals, supporting an entablature punctuated by small attic-level windows. The interior has twelve rooms, thirteen fireplaces and a fifty-three step spiral staircase. The floor to ceiling windows are thirteen feet tall. A man on horseback could easily step through the enormous front and rear doors, which are twelve feet in height.

Architectural historians have ranked the house's free-standing spiral staircase as the most impressive part of the interior. Built of pine stairs and cherry railings, the staircase ascends from the middle of the house, supporting its own weight. Aside from allowing access to the second floor, the staircase helps to cool the house: hot air from the first floor can rise through the stairwell and leave the house through the attic windows.

== See also ==
- List of museums in Indiana
- List of National Historic Landmarks in Indiana
- National Register of Historic Places listings in Jefferson County, Indiana
