= North Madison, Indiana =

Coordinates: 38°46′04″N 85°23′48″W

North Madison is a neighborhood of Madison, Indiana, in the United States.

== History ==
North Madison was platted in 1846. A post office was established at North Madison in 1848, and remained in operation until it was discontinued in 1957. In 1952 North Madison was annexed, becoming a neighborhood of Madison, which aided in providing city services to new businesses started in the area. A tornado in 1974 destroyed a number of buildings in the neighborhood.
