= Madison, Indiana =

City in Indiana, United States

- City
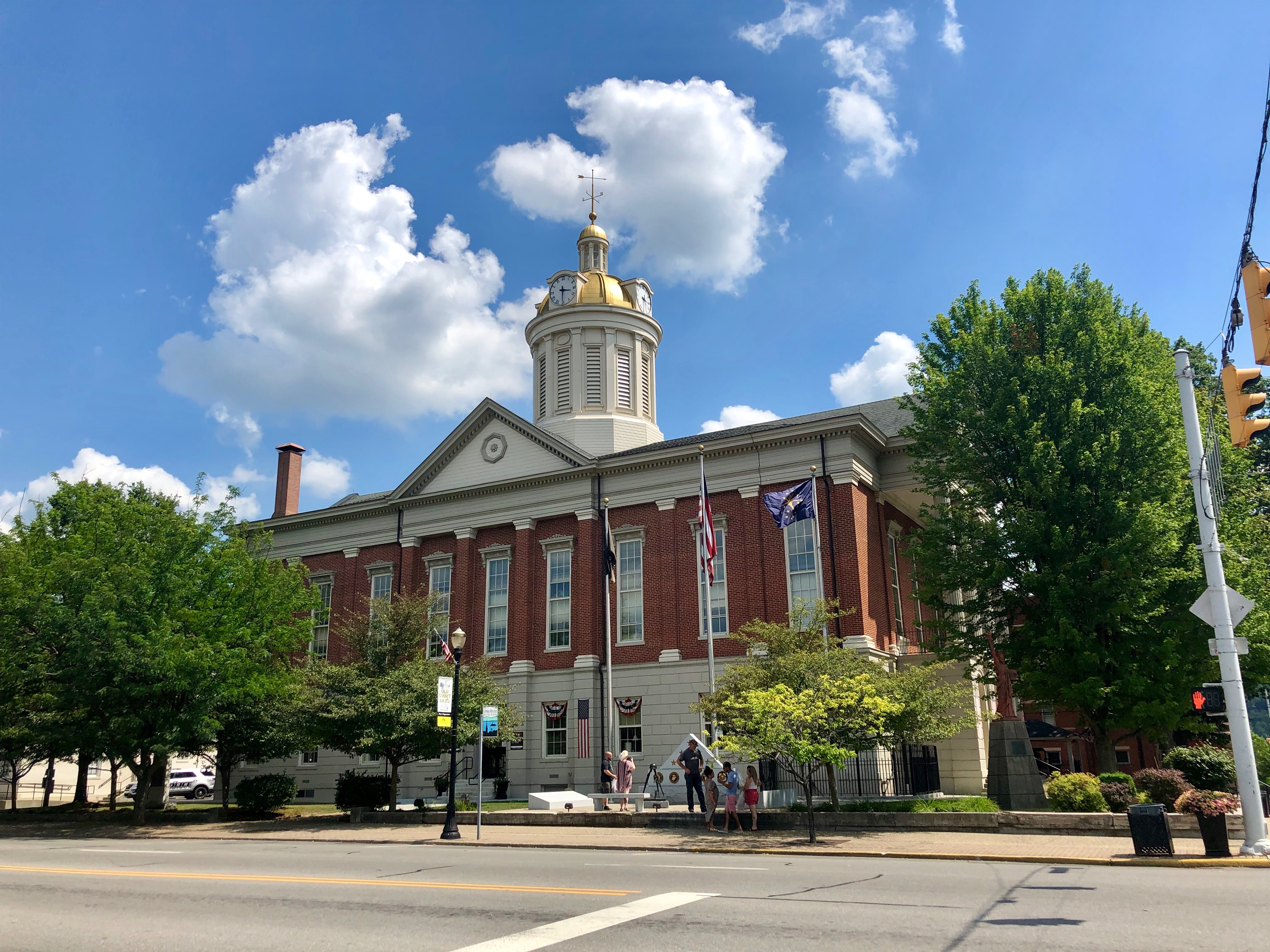
- Jefferson County Courthouse in Madison

- Flag Seal
- Nicknames: "Madtown", "Princess of the Rivers"
- Motto: "America's Hometown"
- Location of Madison in Jefferson County, Indiana
- Coordinates: 38°45′30″N 85°23′50″W
- Country: United States
- State: Indiana
- County: Jefferson
- Township: Madison

Government
  - Type: Mayor-council government
  - Mayor: Bob Courtney (R)

Area
  - City: 8.92 sq mi (23.09 km^{2})
  - Land: 8.64 sq mi (22.38 km^{2})
  - Water: 0.27 sq mi (0.71 km^{2}) 3.05%
- Elevation: 866 ft (264 m)

Population (2020)
  - City: 12,357
  - Density: 1,430.3/sq mi (552.23/km^{2})
  - Metro: 32,428
- Time zone: UTC-5 (EST)
  - Summer (DST): UTC-4 (EDT)
- ZIP code: 47250
- Area code: 812
- FIPS code: 18-45990
- GNIS feature ID: 2395805
- Website: madison-in.gov

Madison is a city in and the county seat of Jefferson County, Indiana, United States, along the Ohio River. As of the 2020 census, Madison had a population of 12,357. Over 55,000 people live within 15 miles (24 km) of downtown Madison. Madison is the largest city along the Ohio River between Louisville and Cincinnati. In 2006, the majority of Madison's downtown area was designated a National Historic Landmark—133 blocks of the downtown area is known as the Madison Historic Landmark District.

== History ==
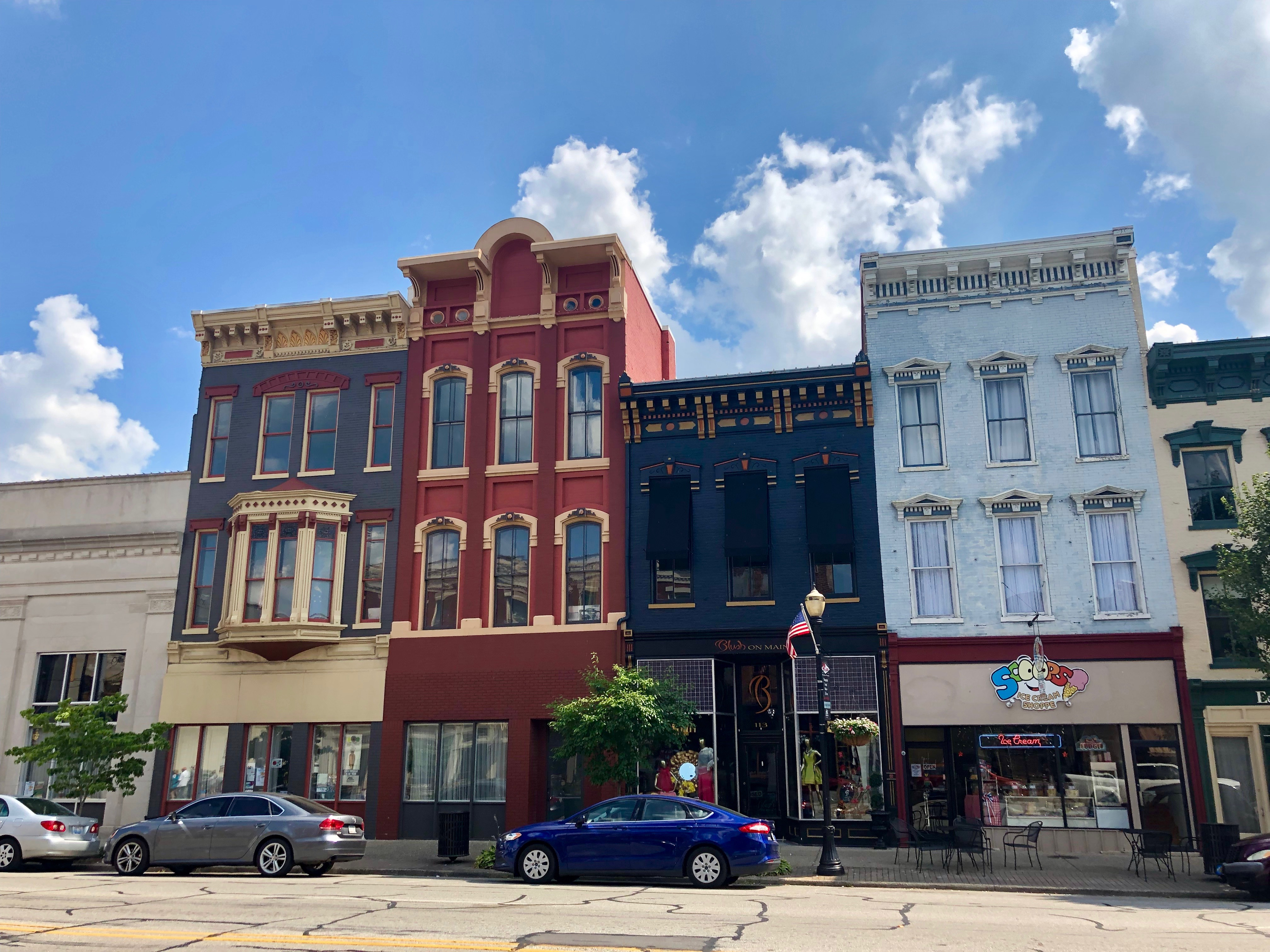
Historic buildings line Main Street in Madison

Madison was laid out and platted in 1810, and the first lots were sold in 1811 by John Paul. It had busy early years due to heavy river traffic and its position as an entry point into the Indiana Territory along the historic Old Michigan Road. Madison's location across the Ohio River from Kentucky, a slave state, made it an important location on the Underground Railroad, which worked to free fugitive slaves. George DeBaptiste's barbershop in town became a nerve center of the local group. By 1850, Madison was the third-largest city in Indiana (after New Albany and Indianapolis), and among the 100 largest cities in the U.S.

Indiana's first railroad, the Madison & Indianapolis Railroad, was built there from 1836 to 1847. Chartered in 1832 by the Indiana State Legislature as the Madison Indianapolis & Lafayette Railroad, and construction begun September 16, 1836, the railroad was transferred to private ownership on January 31, 1843, as the Madison & Indianapolis Railroad. Successful for more than a decade, the railroad went into decline and was sold at foreclosure in 1862, renamed the Indianapolis & Madison Railroad, and after a series of corporate transfers, became part of the massive Pennsylvania Railroad system in 1921. In March 1924, the Madison Area Chamber of Commerce was founded to aid area business growth and development. Conrail much later bought Pennsylvania Railroad, but the deal left out a 26-mile (42 km) stretch of track from North Vernon to Madison. Madison Port Authority purchased this, forming Madison Railroad in 1975.

Madison's days as a leading Indiana city were numbered, however, when river traffic declined and new railroads built between Louisville, Indianapolis, and Cincinnati tapped into Madison's trade network. As a result, Madison's growth did not continue at the same pace it had experienced before the Civil War. During the late nineteenth century, many new buildings were still being built, but in many cases older structures were modernized by adding cast-iron storefronts and ornamental sheet metal cornices. Some earlier buildings survived without major alterations, and the Madison National Landmark Historic District today contains examples of all the major architectural styles of the nineteenth and early twentieth centuries, from Federal to Art Moderne.

In 1952 the town of North Madison was annexed, becoming a neighborhood of the city, which aided in providing city services to new businesses started in the area. A tornado in 1974 destroyed a number of buildings in the neighborhood.

On January 11, 1992, Shanda Sharer was murdered in the city by four teenage girls.

=== National Register of Historic Places ===
Downtown Madison was granted National Historic Landmark District status in early 2006. On August 25, 2006, just months after the designation, a blaze severely damaged two historic downtown buildings, the Madison Elks Lodge and a former city hall building that was occupied by an insurance company.

The Crawford-Whitehead-Ross House, Jefferson County Jail, Lanier Mansion, Madison Historic District, and Charles L. Shrewsbury House are listed on the National Register of Historic Places.

=== Jefferson County Courthouse fire ===
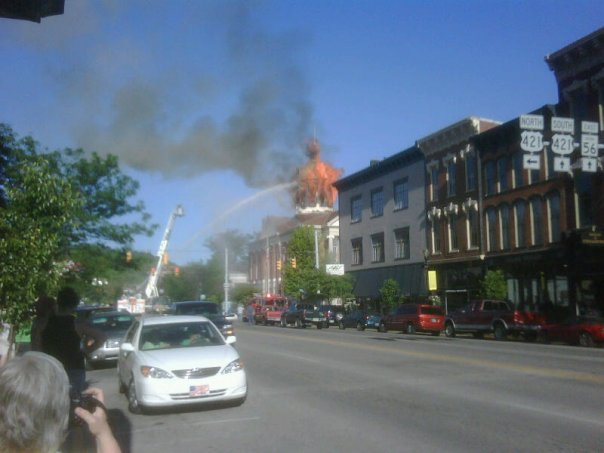
The Jefferson County Courthouse dome engulfed in flames.

On May 20, 2009, the newly painted dome of the Jefferson County Courthouse caught fire. The blaze started around 6:15 pm. Smoke billowed hundreds of feet into the air and flames rose out of the clock tower. The fire continued to burn for hours. Fire officials reported that the fire was tentatively under control just before 9:45 pm. No major injuries were reported. The dome of the courthouse was being painted in celebration of Madison's bicentennial. On May 28, 2009, the ruined dome was removed from the top of the courthouse in two pieces. Authorities stated that the cause of the fire was a contractor using an open-flame propane torch to solder two pieces of copper together in one of the built-in gutters on the north side of the roof.

=== Super Outbreak of tornadoes ===
The 1974 Super Outbreak is the second-largest tornado outbreak on record for a single 24-hour period. From April 3 to April 4, 1974, there were 148 tornadoes confirmed in 13 states, including Illinois, Indiana, Michigan, Ohio, Kentucky, Tennessee, Alabama, Mississippi, Georgia, North Carolina, Virginia, West Virginia, and New York; and the Canadian province of Ontario. It extensively damaged approximately 900 square miles (2,300 km^{2}) along a total combined path length of 2,600 miles (4,200 km). The 1974 Super Outbreak remains the most outstanding severe convective weather episode of record in the continental United States. The outbreak far surpassed previous and succeeding events in severity, longevity and extent.

Shortly after an F-5 tornado struck Depauw, northwest of Louisville, the Hanover/Madison F4 twister formed near Henryville and traveled through Jefferson County, leveling many structures in the town of Hanover and in Madison. Eleven were killed in this storm, while an additional 300 were injured. According to WHAS-TV in Louisville, 90% of Hanover was destroyed or severely damaged, including the Hanover College campus. Despite the fact that no one was killed or seriously injured at the college, all but one of the college's 33 buildings were damaged, including two that were completely destroyed and six that sustained major structural damage. Hundreds of trees were downed, completely blocking every campus road. All utilities were knocked out and communication with those off campus was nearly impossible. Damage to the campus alone was estimated at $10 million. In Madison, seven fatalities took place, and about 300 homes were destroyed; the tornado also brushed the community of China, causing additional fatalities.

The same storm would later strike the Cincinnati area, producing multiple tornadoes including another F5.

== Geography ==
Madison is located at 38°45′N 85°24′W (38.750, −85.395), on the north side of the Ohio River. It is bordered to the south, across the river, by the city of Milton, Kentucky. U.S. Route 421 passes through the center of town, crossing the Ohio into Kentucky on the Milton–Madison Bridge. US-421 leads north 26 miles (42 km) to Versailles, Indiana, and south 23 miles (37 km) to Campbellsburg, Kentucky. Indiana State Road 7 has its southern terminus in Madison and leads northwest 23 miles (37 km) to Vernon. Indiana State Road 56, the Ohio River Scenic Byway, is Madison's Main Street, leading east (upriver) 20 miles (32 km) to Vevay and west 23 miles (37 km) to Scottsburg. Louisville is 48 miles (77 km) southwest of Madison by highway, and Cincinnati is 68 miles (109 km) to the northeast.

Madison is bordered to the west by Clifty Falls State Park, encompassing the canyon of Big Clifty Creek and its tributaries, with several waterfalls, as well as high ground rising 400 feet (120 m) above the Ohio River valley.

According to the 2010 census, Madison has a total area of 8.842 square miles (22.90 km^{2}), of which 8.57 square miles (22.20 km^{2}) (or 96.92%) is land and 0.272 square miles (0.70 km^{2}) (or 3.08%) is water.

=== Climate ===
The climate in this area is characterized by hot, humid summers and generally mild to cool winters. According to the Köppen Climate Classification system, Madison has a humid subtropical climate, abbreviated "Cfa" on climate maps.

== Demographics ==
Historical population
Census	Pop.	Note	%±
1840	3,798		—
1850	8,012		111.0%
1860	8,130		1.5%
1870	10,709		31.7%
1880	8,945		−16.5%
1890	8,936		−0.1%
1900	7,835		−12.3%
1910	6,934		−11.5%
1920	6,711		−3.2%
1930	6,530		−2.7%
1940	6,923		6.0%
1950	7,506		8.4%
1960	10,488		39.7%
1970	13,081		24.7%
1980	12,472		−4.7%
1990	12,006		−3.7%
2000	12,004		0.0%
2010	11,967		−0.3%
2020	12,357		3.3%
Source: US Census Bureau

=== 2020 census ===
As of the 2020 census, Madison had a population of 12,357. The median age was 42.9 years. 18.4% of residents were under the age of 18 and 21.4% of residents were 65 years of age or older. For every 100 females there were 81.3 males, and for every 100 females age 18 and over there were 76.3 males age 18 and over.

92.5% of residents lived in urban areas, while 7.5% lived in rural areas.

There were 5,209 households in Madison, of which 24.9% had children under the age of 18 living in them. Of all households, 38.6% were married-couple households, 19.4% were households with a male householder and no spouse or partner present, and 34.2% were households with a female householder and no spouse or partner present. About 37.3% of all households were made up of individuals and 17.6% had someone living alone who was 65 years of age or older.

There were 5,786 housing units, of which 10.0% were vacant. The homeowner vacancy rate was 1.9% and the rental vacancy rate was 6.9%.

Racial composition as of the 2020 census
Race	Number	Percent
White	11,183	90.5%
Black or African American	268	2.2%
American Indian and Alaska Native	33	0.3%
Asian	201	1.6%
Native Hawaiian and Other Pacific Islander	4	0.0%
Some other race	170	1.4%
Two or more races	498	4.0%
Hispanic or Latino (of any race)	341	2.8%

=== 2010 census ===
As of the census of 2010, there were 11,967 people, 5,048 households, and 2,951 families residing in the city. The population density was 1,396.4 inhabitants per square mile (539.2/km^{2}). There were 5,787 housing units at an average density of 675.3 per square mile (260.7/km^{2}). The racial makeup of the city was 93.5% White, 2.8% African American, 0.2% Native American, 1.2% Asian, 0.7% from other races, and 1.6% from two or more races. Hispanic or Latino of any race were 1.7% of the population.

There were 5,048 households, of which 27.2% had children under the age of 18 living with them, 41.4% were married couples living together, 12.8% had a female householder with no husband present, 4.3% had a male householder with no wife present, and 41.5% were non-families. 35.1% of all households were made up of individuals, and 14.4% had someone living alone who was 65 years of age or older. The average household size was 2.18 and the average family size was 2.79.

The median age in the city was 42.2 years. 21% of residents were under the age of 18; 7.8% were between the ages of 18 and 24; 25% were from 25 to 44; 28.9% were from 45 to 64; and 17.2% were 65 years of age or older. The gender makeup of the city was 44.8% male and 55.2% female.

=== 2000 census ===
As of 2000 the median income for a household in the city was $35,092, and the median income for a family was $46,241. Males had a median income of $32,800 versus $22,039 for females. The per capita income for the city was $18,923. About 10.2% of families and 12.3% of the population were below the poverty line, including 18.3% of those under age 18 and 8.6% of those age 65 or over.

== Powerboat racing ==
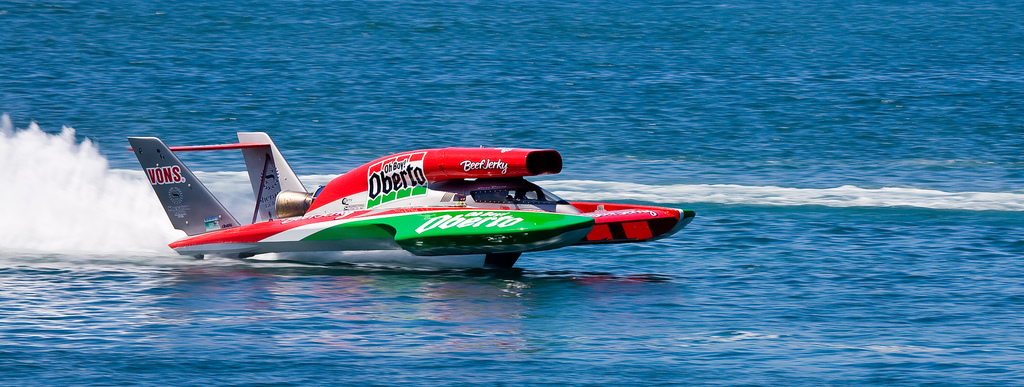
Miss Madison is an H1 Unlimited hydroplane and the only community-owned unlimited hydroplane in the world.

Madison has a powerboat racing tradition dating back to at least 1911. In 1929, the city began holding an annual race, later called the Madison Regatta beginning in 1948. Since 1954, the Madison Regatta has held a high points Unlimited hydroplane race annually in early July. Although Madison has a population of only 12,000, the regatta maintains its place in Unlimited Hydroplane racing, hosting an H1 Unlimited race, whose other events are in Seattle, San Diego, Guntersville, Alabama, and Tri-Cities, Washington. The Madison Regatta draws about 70,000–100,000 people annually on the July 4 weekend. A week-long riverfront festival also surrounds this racing event.

A source of community pride is that Madison has the world's only community-owned unlimited hydroplane racer, Miss Madison, which began Unlimited-class racing in 1961. The boat, which has been known by various corporate sponsor names but was officially called U-6, traditionally finished near the bottom of the circuit. Before Anheuser-Busch dropped its sponsorship of hydroplane racing after the 2004 season, U-6 had won just six races using a variety of hulls. One of those wins was an upset in the 1971 Regatta, when by a mistake in the bidding process, the APBA Gold Cup was held in Madison for the first time, in which the low-budget team and its 1960-vintage hull defeated the well-funded corporate teams and their newer generation of "Thunderboats". The Gold Cup winner retired at the end of the year, taking second place in the overall national standings, and was replaced with a new Miss Madison in 1972. Newer hulls followed in 1978 and 1988. Madison hosted the APBA Gold Cup Race again in 1979 and 1980.

As a participant in the new H1 Unlimited series, the City of Madison team driver, Steve David, finished first in the H1 Unlimited national point drivers standings in both 2005 and 2006 driving U-6, now in the colors of sponsor Oh Boy! Oberto. In 2008, under the aegis of Miss Madison Incorporated and with a new hull built in 2007, the U-1 Miss Madison won its first H1 Unlimited National High Points Championship for Oh Boy! Oberto. On July 3, 2011, at Madison, David escaped serious injury but the hull was seriously damaged when the three-time defending national champion crashed into the U-96 Spirit of Qatar on the third lap of the championship heat after Qatar spun in a turn into the path of the Oh Boy! Oberto/Miss Madison. David and the repaired boat returned in time for the 2011 Columbia Cup, where it finished second (to U-96), then won the August 7 Albert Lee Appliance Cup in Seattle. In true Miss Madison tradition, the repairs to the hull are being defrayed by local fundraisers.

The Miss Madison's greatest accomplishment, when it seemingly came from out of nowhere to win the 1971 Gold Cup with an aged boat against powerful competitors such as Atlas Van Lines II and Miss Budweiser, was recreated in the semi-fictional film Madison.

In 2013, Miss Madison/ Oh Boy! Oberto driver Steve David announced his retirement after his final run at the San Diego Sea Fair. On Friday, November 8, 2013, a retirement celebration was held at the Boneyard Grill on Madison's hilltop to celebrate David's 12-year tenure as the driver of Miss Madison's Oh Boy! Oberto.

The Madison-based team continues to compete in the H1 Unlimited championship, with driver Jimmy Shane and sponsor HomeStreet Bank, who have been with the squad since 2016.

== Government ==
Mayor : Bob Courtney Clerk-Treasurer : Shirley Rynearson Council President : Carla Krebs

=== City Council ===
Office	Name	Party
Councilman-at-Large	Jim Bartlett	Republican
Councilman-at-Large	Joshua Wilbur	Republican
1st District Councilman	Patrick Thevenow	Republican
2nd District Councilman	Carla Krebs (Council President)	Republican
3rd District Councilman	Lucy Dattilo	Republican
4th District Councilman	Joshua Schafer	Republican
5th District Councilman	Joel Storm	Republican

Damon Welch died in September 2019 and Bob Courtney was voted by the Republican Party to finish his term. Courtney was elected to a full term as mayor on November 5, 2019, winning with 62% of the vote.

== Education ==
Madison Consolidated Schools

- Madison Consolidated High School
- Madison Consolidated Junior High School
- Ryker's Ridge Elementary School
- Anderson Elementary School. (closed in 2012, reopened in 2019 following expansion)
- Eggleston Elementary School (now closed, sold 2011)
- Lydia-Middleton Elementary School
- Canaan Elementary School, closed in 2010, reopened 2012 as Canaan Community Academy (a Charter School)
- Deputy Elementary School
- Dupont Elementary School (now closed, 2012)
- E.O. Muncie Elementary School (now closed, 2019)

Southwestern Schools

- Southwestern Junior and Senior High School
- Southwestern Elementary School

Prince of Peace Catholic Schools

- Shawe Memorial High School
- Pope John XXIII Elementary School

Other private schools

- Christian Academy of Madison

Madison has a branch of the Jefferson County Public Library.

== In popular culture ==
In 1943, director Josef Sternberg filmed Madison for the Office of War Information documentary short film The Town, presenting the city as an American ideal community.

Two Hollywood films have been shot in Madison. In the summer of 1957 Madison was selected as the location for Some Came Running, which brought actors Frank Sinatra, Dean Martin and Shirley MacLaine to town. The film was nominated for five Academy Awards. For Some Came Running, released in 1958, director Vincente Minnelli selected Madison to represent the fictional town of Parkman in filming the James Jones novel. On September 3, 1999, the community held an organized celebration to mark the 40th anniversary of the making of the film, which itself became the subject of a film documentary by Turner Classic Movies.

The city of Madison was both the subject and location for the film Madison, released in 2001. The filming brought notable stars such as Jim Caviezel, Bruce Dern, Paul Dooley, and Mary McCormack to town. Madison was released in 2001 and recounts the story of the city's hosting and winning the penultimate hydroplane racing event of 1971, echoing the movie Hoosiers.

A Netflix Docuseries titled Girls Incarcerated was filmed there about the former Madison Juvenile Correction Facility.

== Notable people ==
- David L. Armstrong, former mayor of Louisville, Kentucky
- George Benson, professional football player
- Jesse D. Bright, Lieutenant Governor of Indiana, president pro tempore of the United States Senate, and Confederate sympathizer
- James Graham Brown, entrepreneur, philanthropist
- Bryan Bullington, professional baseball player, pitcher
- Francis Costigan, architect
- Donald W. Duncan, soldier and anti-war activist
- Irene Dunne, five-time Academy Award nominee for Best Actress, raised in Madison
- William Eckert, former Major League Baseball commissioner, raised in Madison
- Bernhard Felsenthal, rabbi
- Gerard Fowke, archaeologist and geologist
- Agnes Moore Fryberger, music educator
- Steve Green, basketball player, Indiana University and NBA
- Joe L. Hensley, lawyer, science-fiction writer
- James F.D. Lanier, chartered State Bank of Indiana in 1833
- Martin A. Marks, businessman
- Samuel Austin Moffett (1864–1939), early Presbyterian missionary to Korea
- David Graham Phillips, novelist and journalist
- Emily Lee Sherwood Ragan (1839–1916), author, journalist
- Olive Sanxay (1873–1965), poet
- Shanda Sharer, murder victim
- William McKendree Snyder, artist
- Paul Sorvino, actor
- Milton Stapp, Lieutenant Governor of Indiana, second mayor of Madison
- Jeremiah C. Sullivan, attorney, Civil War general in the Union Army
- Tommy Thevenow, professional baseball player for 1926 World Series champion St. Louis Cardinals
- John L. Tiernon, U.S. Army brigadier general
- George David Yater, watercolor artist associated with the Cape Cod School of Art
- Adam Alexander, sports broadcaster

== See also ==
- List of cities and towns along the Ohio River
