= Francis Costigan =

American architect (1810–1865)

- Born: March 4, 1810; Washington, D.C., US
- Died: April 18, 1865 (aged 55); Indianapolis, Indiana, US
- Occupation: Architect
- Buildings: Charles Shrewsbury House; Lanier Mansion; Francis Costigan House

Francis Costigan (March 4, 1810 – April 18, 1865) was an Indiana architect known primarily for his work in Madison, Indiana and Indianapolis. He worked primarily in the Greek Revival style.

== Life and work ==
Born in 1810 in Washington, D.C., Costigan worked as a carpenter in Baltimore, before settling in Madison, Indiana in 1837. Two of his important Madison commissions are the Lanier Mansion and the Charles Shrewsbury House, both National Historic Landmarks. His own home in Madison is listed on the National Register of Historic Places, and is available for tours through Historic Madison, Inc. He left Madison for Indianapolis in 1851 where he designed residences and public buildings. Notable works included the Institute for the Education of the Blind, the Bates House (1852–3), the Odd Fellows Building (1853), the Gatling Gun Club, the Wallace Residence and the Groves Residence. In 1858, he designed, built and then operated a hotel called the Oriental on the site of what is now the Le Méridien Indianapolis Hotel in downtown Indianapolis. According to historian Wilbur Peat, Costigan was Indiana's "outstanding architect" in the state's formative years. He died in Indianapolis in 1865 and is buried in Crown Hill Cemetery (Section 1, Lot 26).

== Notable works ==
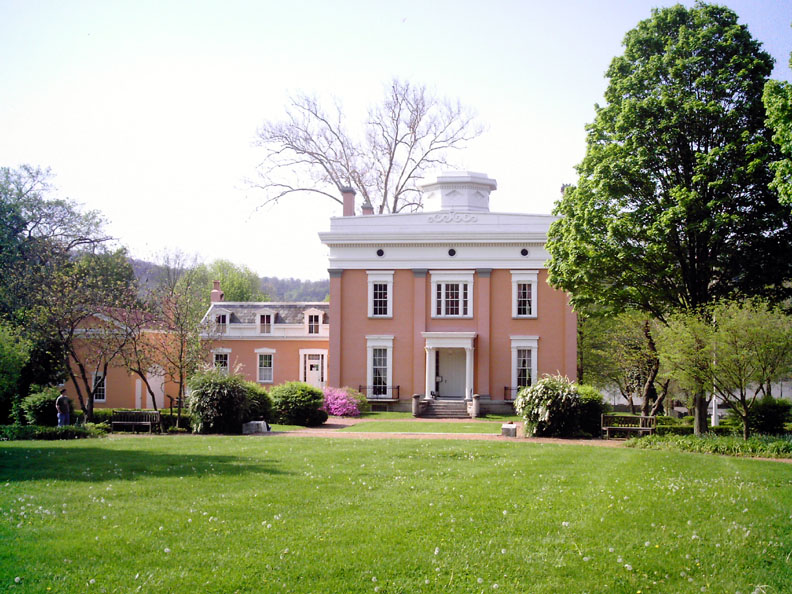
Lanier Mansion

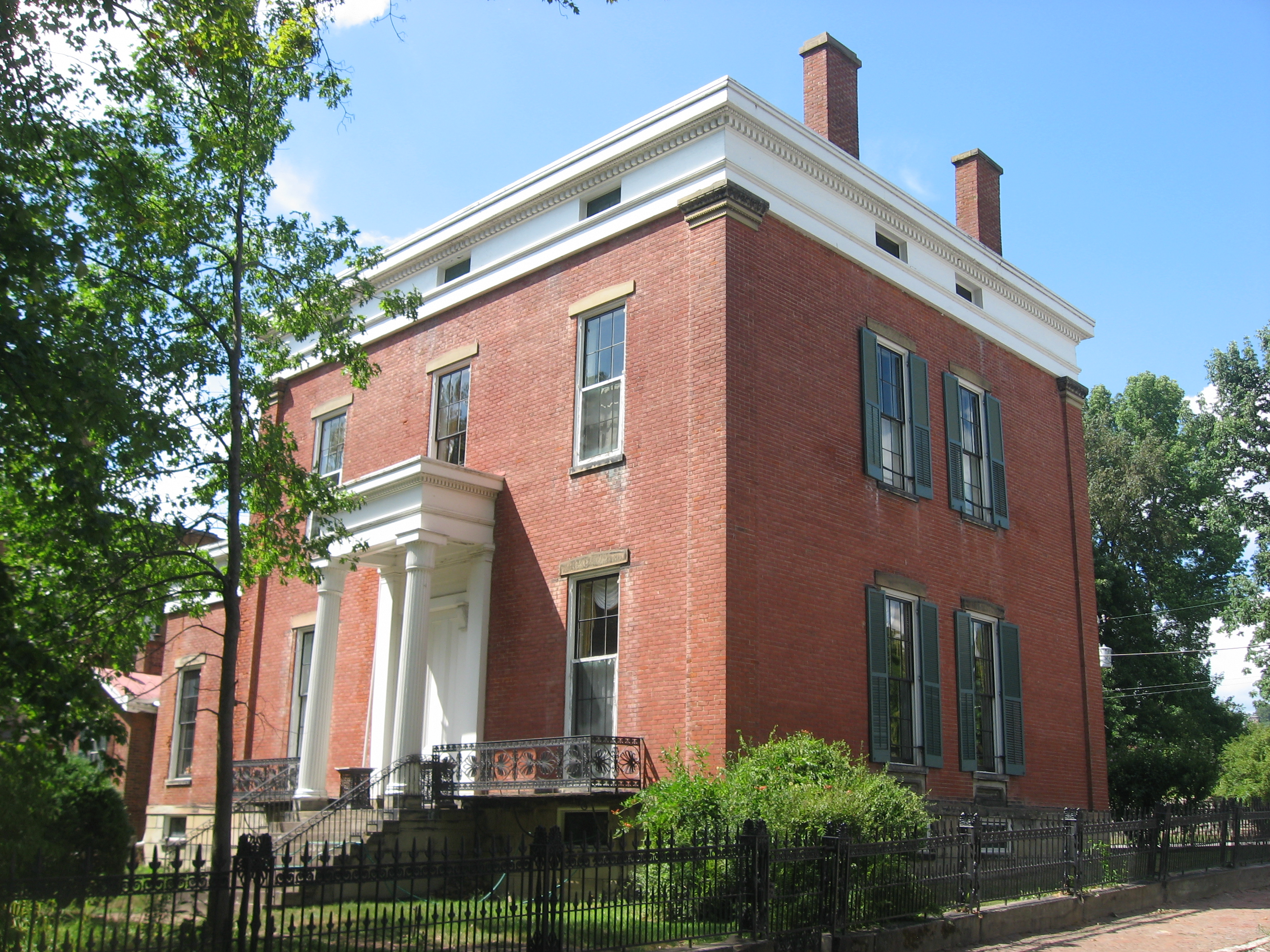
Charles Shrewsbury House
