= American Industrial Union =

Former trade union of the United States

For the Fourierist organization of 1844 known by this name, see American Union of Associationists.

George W. Howard, former Vice President of the American Railway Union, was the creator of the American Industrial Union.

The American Industrial Union (AIU) was a short-lived American labor organization launched in April 1895 in Chicago by George W. Howard, formerly of the American Railway Union. The organization was an attempt to construct an industrial trade union encompassing workers from a multitude of crafts into a single labor organization.

Several locals of the AIU were established in Chicago, with a total membership of approximately 500. Efforts to join forces with the ARU proved unsuccessful and the union died a quiet death late in 1895 or early in 1896.

== Organizational history ==
=== Establishment ===
Initial conversations about establishing a new industrial union to be known as the American Industrial Union (AIU) began in March 1895, with news reports at the end of that month indicating that former US Senator Lyman Trumbull of Illinois, a friend of the organized labor movement, had been approached with an offer to be made head of the new organization. Trumbull would decline the offer, leaving its chief originator, former Vice President of the American Railway Union (ARU) George W. Howard to serve as the public face of the new organization.

The AIU was officially launched on April 21, 1895, at a meeting of 35 delegates held in Chicago through Howard's initiative. Howard proclaimed the ARU to be defunct in the aftermath of the failed 1894 Pullman strike and characterized the new union as a logical successor to the ARU's effort to build a mass industrial organization.

A new constitution, written by Howard, C.E. Ward, and James Nugent, was read to the assembly — a process taking a full hour and about which there was no discussion permitted. Heated debate followed, with one newspaper account indicating that dissidents "argued that it was preposterous to rush through a constitution in a few minutes which was supposed to contain the underlying principles of the industrial structure of America." A majority of those gathered were Howard loyalists, however, and the constitution was rapidly approved seriatim, with votes on the various sections approved in rapid succession.

Debate turned to a letter about the new organization written by Eugene V. Debs, with some seeking to have the correspondence filed without reading while others insisting on the document being read. As the new union had been conceived while Howard and Debs were incarcerated together at McHenry County Jail earlier in the year, the views of ARU President Debs about the AIU — positive or negative — were deemed important for the future of the new organization.

After a vote, the Debs letter was read. Debs declined to participate in the AIU, asserting his continued allegiance to the American Railway Union and casting its future prospects in highly optimistic terms.

The AIU patterned itself after the American Railway Union but with a goal of establishing national labor bureaus throughout the United States and seeing to the implementation of the 8-hour day by September 1, 1897. The preamble to the organization's constitution called for expansion of the principle of cooperation, the establishment of postal savings banks, and universal suffrage for women. No political party was endorsed, with union members encourage to continue to support the candidates and parties of their own choosing.

The AIU rather fantastically claimed a membership of 5,000 at the time of its launch, with most of its adherents said to come from the ranks of telegraphers. A more reasonable estimate may be extrapolated from another contemporary press report indicating a membership of about 300 for Local Union No. 1, the first and most important chapter of the organization, which ultimately had three locals in Chicago.

A national convention to perfect the organization was slated for January 1896.

=== Structure ===
The AIU was to be funded by means of $1 initiation fees and annual dues, with the April convention following the American Railway Union in setting an annual fee of $1. The organization declared that it would not conduct strikes nor build a fund for striking workers, but rather expressed its intention to use its surplus funds for the support of various cooperative colonies which were being established in the United States. Membership was open to all save for representatives of monopolistic corporations without regard to religion, race, or gender.

J.H. Copeland, a lawyer, was selected by the April 1895 organizing convention as the President of the AIU, with George W. Howard chosen as General Secretary.

The AIU was headed by a ten-member board of directors which included a President, two Vice Presidents, a Secretary, and a Treasurer. Those elected included:

- A.J. Arkin
- J.H. Copeland
- S.H. Herbeson
- George W. Howard
- W.I. Howard
- George Muller
- James Nugent
- R.H. Rogers
- C.E. Ward
- W.W. Welsh

=== Development ===
After its April 1895 launch, the American Industrial Union met each Sunday in Chicago, with a nucleus of about 40 members regularly attending these Sunday sessions. These gatherings were soon marked by factionalism, however, with one May 1895 session garnering front page headlines when General Secretary Howard was challenged by local Knights of Labor activist August E. Gans for having solely authored the organization's constitution and forcing its passage in unaltered form. "If anyone does not agree exactly with your pet schemes, you brand him an obstructionist,” Gans is reported to have said, adding, "you want everything your own way." Howard erupted in fury at "such personal attacks," declaring, "I will settle this with you outside." While no fisticuffs actually resulted, the young union's effort to project itself as stable and harmonious was severely undercut by the acrimony.

At least three "Local Unions" of the AIU were established in Chicago by the middle of May 1895.

Out on bail after serving just 17 days of his 3 month jail sentence for contempt of court in association with the Pullman Strike, on June 10, 1895, General Secretary Howard was notified that he and the other convicted leaders of the American Railway Union would have to return to jail for the completion of their terms following a refusal of the United States Supreme Court to overturn their convictions. While Debs and the other ARU leaders were returned to Woodstock Jail, owing to strained relations over the AIU Howard was allowed to complete his sentence in another Illinois county jail, serving his final 73 days at the Will County Jail in Joliet, Illinois. Extension of the AIU was hampered by its leader's removal from activity during this time.

Attendance at local meetings soon flagged and while hope was held out that popular orator Eugene Debs of the ARU would fully embrace the AIU, no firm endorsement would follow. The simultaneous release of former ARU Vice President Howard from Joliet and all other directors of the ARU (except Debs) from Woodstock on August 22 was met with an explicit denial of any intention to join forces of the two organizations by ARU director William Burns.

Burns declared that "to all inquiries of this sort we have invariably answered that we know nothing about the American Industrial Union. We think we are a sufficiently big tub to stand on our own bottom."

Instead the ARU announced its plan to reorganize on the basis of a secret society in an effort to avoid the blacklisting of its members by railroad corporations and a renewed effort to build the ARU as an industrial union of railway workers.

=== Termination ===
The AIU attempted to wield influence upon the Democratic Party at its 1896 National Convention, dispatching a three member delegation to Chicago in July to attempt to insert three planks in the party's electoral platform. These included such traditional Republican themes as establishment of a protective tariff to help eliminate the deleterious effects of "imported goods made by cheap foreign labor" and "honest money...sufficient in amount to transact the business of the country" (a euphemism for gold), as well as a plank calling for arbitration as a means of solving labor disputes. The actual platform only gave a minor tip of the cap to the last of these three proposals, declaring the Democrats to be "in favor of the arbitration of differences between employers engaged in interstate commerce and their employees."

Unable to join forces with the ARU and its popular leader Eugene Debs or to generate publicity through the launch of cooperative colonies, the AIU seems to have died a quiet death sometime in the second half of 1896.

By the end of 1898 the American Federation of Labor could ridicule its former potential rival in unabashedly harsh terms, proclaiming it "the greatest fake union ever perpetrated upon the workingmen of this or any other country," which had been populated only by a group of temporary officers-elect, none of whom, the AF of L contended, "had ever been known to work for a living" except for Secretary Howard, who was "a cripple."
