= L. W. Rogers =

American labor unionist

L.W. Rogers as he appeared at the time of his leaving the editorship of Railroad Trainmen's Journal in 1892.

Louis William Rogers (May 28, 1859 – April 18, 1953), commonly known as "L.W.," was an American teacher, railway brakeman, trade union functionary, socialist political activist, and newspaper editor. Rogers is best remembered in this context as one of the key officials of the American Railway Union jailed in conjunction with the Pullman Strike of 1894. After more than two decades in and around the labor movement, Rogers shifted his activity to mysticism as a prominent lecturer, writer, and long-time president of the Theosophical Society in America.

== Biography ==
=== Early years ===
Louis William Rogers was born in the state of Iowa in the Midwestern United States on May 28, 1859. Trained as a teacher, Rogers taught in the public schools of Iowa and Kansas for a period of five years, beginning late in the 1870s.

Rogers later went to work as a brakeman, a crew member of a locomotive train who helped regulate the speed through the manual application of brakes. He worked across a number of midwestern railways, including the Kansas City, Springfield & Memphis, the Wabash & Western, the Santa Fe, and the Chicago, Burlington & Quincy. Rogers was fired from his position on the latter road during the Burlington railroad strike of 1888, when he supported the locomotive engineers striking the road. Following his dismissal Rogers toured the Burlington route engaging in public speeches on behalf of the strikers, traveling from Illinois all the way to Colorado on his mission.

Leaving actual railway work after his dismissal from the Burlington & Quincy, Rogers launched his first newspaper, the Railroad Patriot in St. Joseph, Missouri. The paper proved to be short-lived, terminating publication the following year.

With his newspaper having folded, in 1889 Rogers moved to the state of Colorado, where he first became active in the Brotherhood of Railroad Brakemen (BRB), known from 1890 as the Brotherhood of Railroad Trainmen (BRT). He edited two short-lived newspapers in Colorado, the Denver Patriot and the Vona Herald as the 1880s came to a close.

In September 1889, Rogers was chosen as a delegate to the national convention of the BRB, which selected him as editor of the official organ of the union, the Railroad Brakemen's Journal. He continued in this capacity until the end of 1892.

In the 1880s Rogers also became a public lecturer on Freethought and its underlying philosophical doctrine of Rationalism.

Early in the 1890s Rogers returned to the Midwest, moving first to Galesburg, Illinois, then to Chicago, and finally in 1892 to Oshkosh, Wisconsin. There Rogers established a new newspaper, the Age of Labor, which he published and edited until its 1893 merger with The Labor Advocate, one of the prominent labor newspapers of the day.

In 1893 Rogers helped to establish the Wisconsin State Federation of Labor.

=== American Railway Union activities ===
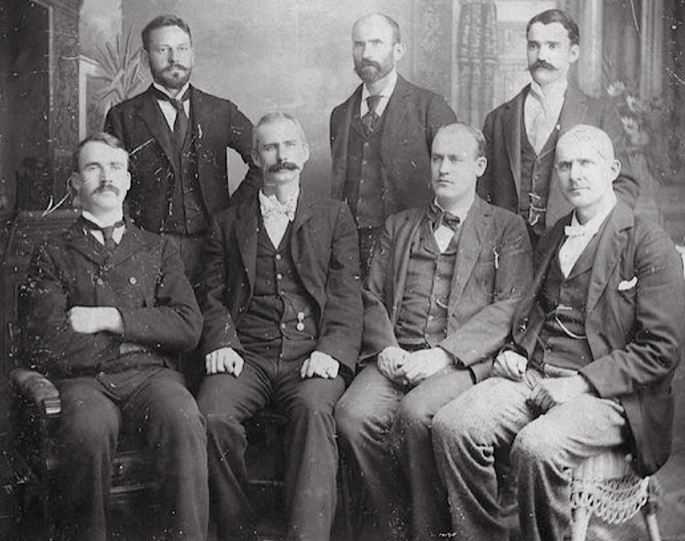
Seven of the eight officers of the American Railway Union jailed in connection with the 1894 Pullman Strike. (Standing, L-R): George W. Howard, Martin J. Elliott, Sylvester Keliher. (Seated, L-R): William E. Burns, James Hogan, Roy M. Goodwin, Eugene V. Debs. Not Shown: L. W. Rogers.

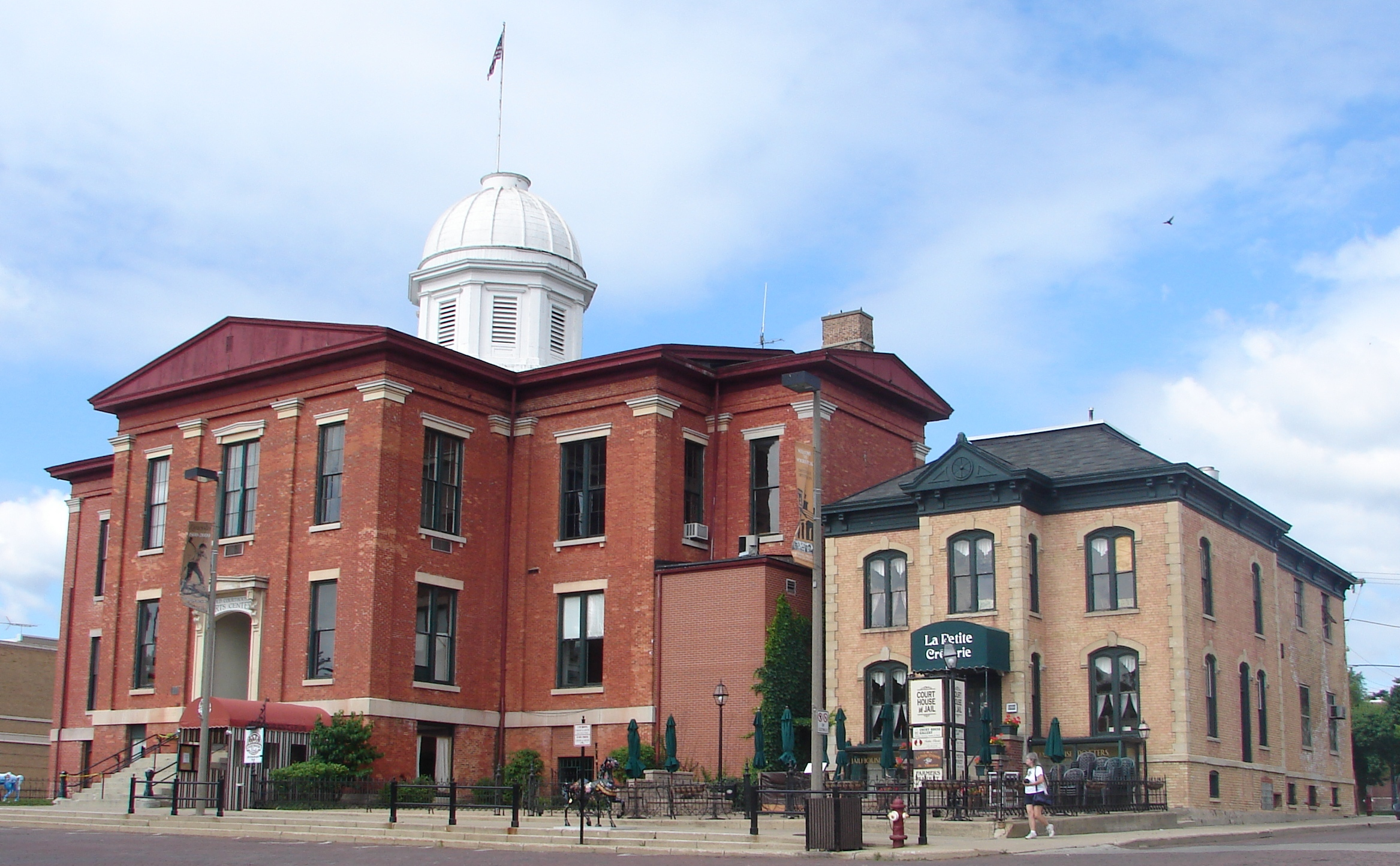
McHenry County Courthouse and Jail in Woodstock, Illinois as they appear today.

As a veteran trade unionist and railway worker, Rogers found the 1894 establishment of the American Railway Union (ARU) by former Brotherhood of Locomotive Firemen official Eugene V. Debs to be irresistible — an attempt to create an industrial union joining workers in the myriad of railway crafts into a centralized and therefore powerful organization. Rogers became active in the ARU, was named to the organization's seven-member executive board, and was appointed editor of the organization's weekly newspaper, Railway Times.

This position as an ARU executive put Rogers in harm's way, however, as a victim of the process set in motion when the U.S. government sought to end the bitter 1894 Pullman Strike launched by the ARU by means of judicial injunction.

On July 2, 1894, United States Attorney General Richard Olney and his assistant Edwin Walker instructed Chicago US Attorney Thomas M. Milchrist to file a bill in equity with the combined US District and Circuit Courts summarizing the harm allegedly done to the railroads and to commerce by the ARU strike. District Court Judge Peter S. Grosscup and Circuit Court Judge William A. Woods actively worked with the petitioner to shape and refine the injunction request, which was granted.

The judges on that same day ordered that 10,000 copies of their newly granted injunction be printed and distributed by federal marshals along the striking railroad lines. The ARU was thereby ordered to cease and desist interfering with or hindering trains on any involved railroad or any train carrying U.S. Mail.

When the strike was not terminated two weeks after issuance of the injunction, the government returned to court charging that ARU head Gene Debs, Vice President George W. Howard, Secretary Sylvester Keliher, and Editor Rogers were in contempt of court for failing to abide by the injunction. This July 17 hearing did not actually find the four to be in contempt, but nevertheless presiding judge William H. Seaman ordered the defendants to be temporarily held pending another hearing on July 23. Bail was set at $3,000 each.

Rogers and his three ARU associates surrendered to authorities the same afternoon that the so-called "body attachment order" was issued. To the surprise of contemporary observers, all four ARU officials waived the right to post bail and were immediately jailed. Rogers later recalled that the substantial amount set for bail was not the cause of this decision, declaring, "If it was $2, I'd go to jail. This is a mighty test between labor and capital, and we will fight it to the finish."

Owing to an indefinite end to the period of incarceration, this decision was quietly reversed on July 25, 1894, when bail was posted and Debs, Rogers and the other ARU leaders freed from the Cook County Jail. Trial was set to begin on September 5.

On December 14, 1894, fully three months after the trial of the ARU had been held, Judge Woods finally issued a lengthy ruling. Wood found the union and its leaders guilty of having conducted an illegal strike in violation of the Sherman Anti-Trust Act.

Debs was sentenced to 6 months in jail as leader of the ARU, while Rogers and the other defendants in the case were sentenced to terms of 3 months. These sentences were not to be served in Chicago's Cook County Jail, but rather in McHenry County Jail in neighboring Woodstock, Illinois. These sentences were served, starting in June 1895, with Rogers and the other 5 members of the ARU executive board gaining their release on August 22. Debs was released three months later. Additional civil penalties were assessed against the union.

=== Later labor activism ===
Upon his release, the ARU having been effectively crushed in the failed Pullman strike, Rogers moved to Pueblo, Colorado, where he worked as an organizer for the American Federation of Labor. He also edited yet another labor newspaper in 1896, the Industrial Advocate.

With the launch of the Social Democratic Party of America in 1897, an organization springing in large part from activists loyal to Gene Debs and his ARU, Rogers became involved in the affairs of that organization. He returned to Chicago to edit the new political party's official organ, The Social Democrat for a time, and helped to manage the massive speaking tours of Debs, one of the renowned orators of the day, for the next two years.

While remaining involved in socialist politics, Rogers remained a participant in the economic labor movement as well, serving as president of the Michigan Federation of Labor from 1898 to 1899.

=== Theosophy ===
In the 20th century, Rogers turned his attention to a new interest, mysticism and theosophy. In 1903 Rogers joined the Theosophical Society in America (TSA). Rogers was soon absorbed by the Theosophical movement, lecturing extensively and publishing numerous books and pamphlets on reincarnation, life after death, karma, and sundry matters of philosophical idealism.

As one of the most prominent American exponents of esoteric mysticism, Rogers would be elected vice president of the TSA in 1918, serving in that capacity until 1920, when he would ascend to the presidency of that organization. Rogers would remain as president of the Theosophical Society for more than a decade, standing down in 1931.

Following his time at the helm of the TSA, Rogers served as the editor of two of the organization's periodicals — Ancient Wisdom, which he edited from 1935 to 1936, and The Voice, from 1951 to 1952.

=== Death and legacy ===
Louis Rogers died on April 18, 1953, in Santa Barbara, California.

== Works ==
- "Will White Slavery Be Established?" Railway Carmen's Journal, vol. 3, whole no. 26 (May 1893), pp. 267–269.
- The Evidence for Theosophy: A Lecture. Harrogate: Theosophical Publishing Committee, 1906.
- The Occultism in Shakespeare's Plays. New York: Theosophical Book Co., 1909.
- Occultism as a Factor in Civilization: A Lecture on the Two Phases of Human Evolution Represented in the Civilization of the Occident and the Orient. Ridgewood, NJ: Theosophical Book Company, 1910.
- The Hidden Side of Evolution: A Lecture on the Reasonableness of the Existence of a Spiritual Hierarchy and the Guidance of Human Evolution. Chicago: L.W. Rogers, n.d. [c. 1910s].
- What Theosophy Is. Chicago: National Publicity Department, Theosophical Society, 1910.
- Soul Powers and Possibilities: A Lecture on Some of the Methods of Nature in Evolving Latent Powers and Faculties in Human Beings. Los Angeles: Theosophical Book Concern, 1910.
- Karma: Nature's Law of Justice: A Lecture on the Law of Cause and Effect as Operating in Some of the Affairs of Love. Los Angeles: Theosophical Book Concern, n.d. [c. 1910s].
- Hints to Young Students of Occultism. Los Angeles: Theosophical Book Concern, 1915.
- The Inspired Life. Los Angeles: L.W. Rogers, 1915.
- Self Development and the Way to Power. Los Angeles: L.W. Rogers, 1916.
- Elementary Theosophy. Los Angeles: Theosophical Book Concern, 1917.
- The Life Sublime. Chicago: Theosophical Book Co., 1917.
- Reincarnation from the Scientific Viewpoint: A Lecture. Chicago: Theosophical Book Co., 1917.
- Reincarnation: Do We Life on Earth Again? Chicago : National Publicity Dept., Theosophical Society, 1917.
- The Logic of Reincarnation: A Lecture. Chicago: Theosophical Book Co., 1918.
- Beyond the Border: A Lecture. Chicago: Theosophical Book Co., 1918.
- Occultism as a Factor in Civilization: A Lecture. Chicago: Theosophical Book Co., 1918.
- Scientific Evidence of Future Life: A Lecture. Chicago: Theosophical Book Co., 1918.
- The Invisible World About Us: A Lecture on the Unseen Regions Beyond the Grasp of the Physical Senses and the Life We Live After Bodily Death. Chicago: Theosophical Book Co., 1918.
- Australian War Speeches and the Soldier Dead. Chicago: Theosophical Book Co., c. 1918.
- Dreams and Premonitions. Chicago: Theo Book Co., 1923.
- Theosophical Questions Answered. Chicago: Theo Book Co., 1924.
- Gods in the Making, and Other Lectures. Chicago: Theo Book Co., 1925.
- The Purpose of Life, and Other Lectures. Chicago: Theo Book Co., 1925.
- The Soldier Dead; and A Scientific Religion. Chicago: Theo Book Co., 1925.
- Universal Brotherhood. Chicago: Theo Book Co., 1925.
- Hints to Students of Occultism. Chicago: Theo Book Co., 1931.
- The Coming Civilization. Chicago: Theo Book Co., 1934.
- Olcott Manual: First Series: Theosophy, Religion, Science, Philosophy. With Annie Besant. Wheaton, IL: Theosophical Press, 1934.
- Reincarnation, and Other Lectures. Wheaton, IL: Theosophical Press, n.d. [1940s].
- The Ghosts in Shakespeare: A Study of the Occultism in the Shakespeare Plays. Wheaton, IL: Theosophical Press, 1949.
- Man: An Embryo God, and Other Lectures. Wheaton, IL: Theosophical Press, 1950.
- Karma: The Law of Human Destiny. New York : Philosophers Book Shop, n.d.
