= George W. Howard =

George Washington Howard
- George W. Howard, vice president of the American Railway Union and founder of the American Industrial Union
- Born: November 16, 1848; Lawrence County, Illinois, US
- Died: February 25, 1940 (aged 91); South Pasadena, California
- Known for: railway labor organizer

George Washington Howard (November 16, 1848 – February 25, 1940) was an American railway worker and trade union official. Howard is best remembered as the head of the Brotherhood of Railway Conductors (BRC), a rival to the Order of Railway Conductors (ORC) that was established in 1885 and later absorbed into the ORC in 1891. Howard was also the Vice President of the American Railway Union from 1893 to 1894, and was a significant figure in the failed Pullman Strike of 1894.

== Biography ==
=== Early years ===
George Washington Howard was born in Lawrence County, Illinois. He began his career as a newsboy, working on the Evansville and Crawfordsville Railroad.

During the American Civil War, Howard served in the Union Army for two years in Company F of the 58th Indiana Infantry Regiment.

As a young man, Howard worked various railroad jobs, from the dangerous job of brakeman to general superintendent. Among other companies, Howard worked for the Louisville, New Albany, and Chicago Railroad, the Ohio and Mississippi Railway, the Atchison, Topeka and Santa Fe Railway, and the Louisville and Nashville Railroad.

=== Brotherhood of Railway Conductors ===
In 1885, Howard spearheaded the establishment of a new trade union, the Brotherhood of Railway Conductors (BRC), as a rival to the long-established Order of Railway Conductors (ORC). He was elected to the leading position of Grand Chief Conductor.

After half a decade, the two railway conductor organizations combined in 1891, with the ORC absorbing its rival.

=== California streetcar lines ===
Howard was instrumental in constructing the lines of the Coronado Beach Company, a transportation company that helped launch the city of Coronado, California, and was involved in building the city's streetcar system in neighboring San Diego.

In 1890, Howard returned to the Midwestern United States to become master of transportation for the Mackey system of railroads in Indiana.

=== American Railway Union ===
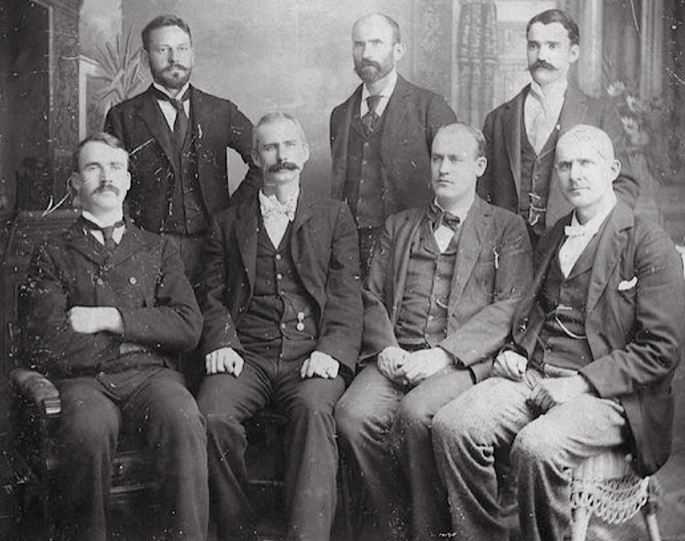
Seven of the eight officers of the American Railway Union jailed in connection with the 1894 Pullman Strike. (Standing, L-R): George W. Howard, Martin J. Elliott, Sylvester Keliher. (Seated, L-R): William E. Burns, James Hogan, Roy M. Goodwin, Eugene V. Debs. Not Shown: L. W. Rogers.

Howard was elected vice president of the American Railway Union (ARU) when it formed in 1893; Eugene V. Debs was elected president. He spent much of 1894 on the road speaking for the organization. One contemporary observer, after hearing Howard speak at an ARU organizing meeting in Brazil, Indiana, remarked:

"Mr. Howard is a rapid speaker and has foiled the brightest stenographers who have attempted to catch the elegant language as it flowed from his lips. Mr. Howard is a short, heavy-set fellow, and is alert and active as a cat, and talks with lightning rapidity.... He claimed that the existing orders could not reconcile themselves to perfect federation, and consequently it was necessary to have an order large and broad enough to encompass all classes of railroad employees, thus bringing them closer together and eliminating the prejudices existing in the orders of today."

In August 1894, Howard testified on behalf of striking American Railway Union workers before the United States Strike Commission appointed by President Grover Cleveland. Howard opposed the strike and believed it would not have occurred "had the A.R.U. been strong enough." The union's involvement in the strike led to a jail term for Debs at Woodstock and a term for Howard at Joliet; Howard became the first US prisoner confined at Joliet.

=== Later years ===
In April 1895, Howard was the principal organizer of the American Industrial Union (AIU), a new industrial union. He was elected General Secretary of that organization at its founding convention in Chicago. The AIU platform included the standardization of the eight-hour workday nationwide, settlement of disputes between labor and management through arbitration, women's suffrage (but not women's political participation beyond voting), temperance, and equal pay for women doing the same jobs as men.

By the summer of 1899, Howard had retired from labor organization to become a farmer in Arkansas. Howard's farm was located on the Ouachita River at Witherspoon, about five miles north of Arkadelphia.

In his later years, Howard lectured on "The Application of Cooperation to Trade Unionism" in Little Rock as late as November 1902.

He died on February 25, 1940, in South Pasadena, California.
