= James Hogan (trade unionist) =

American trade unionist

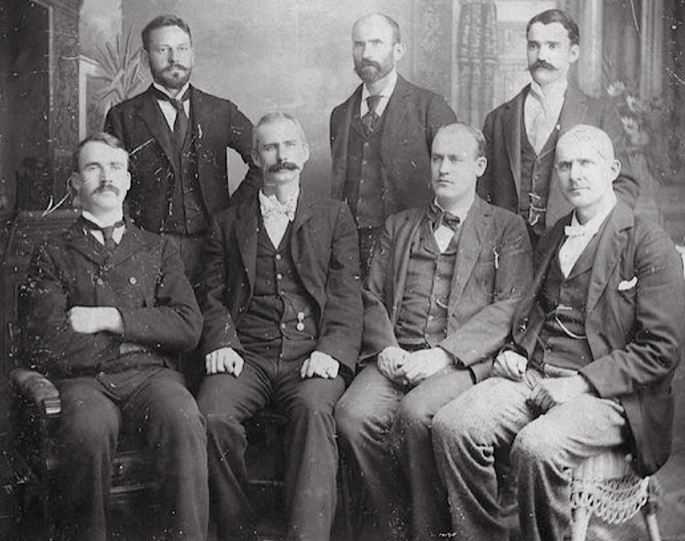
Seven of the eight officers of the American Railway Union jailed in connection with the 1894 Pullman Strike. (Standing, L-R): George W. Howard, Martin J. Elliott, Sylvester Keliher. (Seated, L-R): William E. Burns, James Hogan, Roy M. Goodwin, Eugene V. Debs. Not Shown: L. W. Rogers.

James Hogan was an American trade unionist. He is best known for being a leading member of the American Railway Union. He was also a member of the Brotherhood of Railroad Trainmen (Salt Lake lodge #68) and secretary of its grievance committee on the Union Pacific Railroad.
