= American Railway Union =

Former trade union of the United States

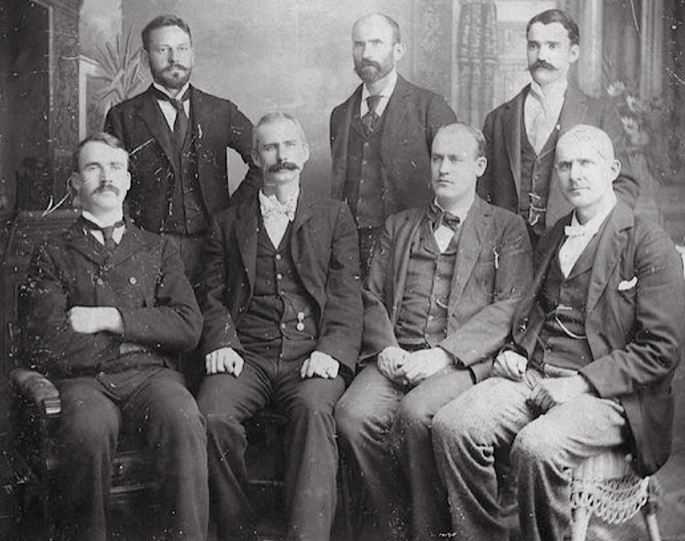
Seven of the eight officers of the American Railway Union jailed in connection with the 1894 Pullman Strike. (Standing, L-R): George W. Howard, Martin J. Elliott, Sylvester Keliher. (Seated, L-R): William E. Burns, James Hogan, Roy M. Goodwin, Eugene V. Debs. Not Shown: L. W. Rogers.

The American Railway Union (ARU) was one of the major American labor unions of the 1890s and one of the first industrial unions in the United States. It was co-founded by Eugene V. Debs.

Launched at a meeting held in Chicago in February 1893, the ARU won an early victory in a strike on the Great Northern Railroad in the summer of 1894. This successful strike was followed by the bitter 1894 Pullman Strike in which government troops and the power of the judiciary were enlisted against the ARU, ending with the jailing of the union's leadership for six months in 1895 and effectively crushing the organization. The group's blacklisted and dispirited remnants finally disbanded the organization via amalgamation into the Social Democracy of America (SDA) at its founding convention in June 1897.

== Organizational history ==
=== Establishment ===
Volition for a formation of an industrial union uniting all branches of the railroad industry began in the early 1890s with the failure of an attempt at loose federation of several railway brotherhoods by Brotherhood of Locomotive Firemen and Enginemen Secretary-Treasurer and Locomotive Firemen's Magazine editor Eugene V. Debs. A new union bringing together all railway workers, regardless of craft or service, was constructed in a series of meetings held in Chicago, Illinois, beginning with a four-hour session held at the Leland Hotel on February 9 and 10, 1893. Headquarters for the new union were to be rented in Chicago.

This preparatory meeting, chaired by George W. Howard of Oshkosh, Wisconsin, former Grand Chief of the Brotherhood of Railway Conductors, elected a three-person committee to write a constitution and by-laws for the new organization, which was formally launched at a week-long convention attended by 24 delegates representing many of the numerous railway brotherhoods held at Chicago's Greene Hotel from April 11–17, 1893. This gathering formally elected officers for the new union, including Debs as president, Howard as vice president and Sylvester Keliher (Secretary-Treasurer of the Brotherhood of Railway Carmen) as Secretary-Treasurer of the ARU.

Day-to-day governance was by these three officers as part of a nine-member Board of Directors, which also included W.S. Missemer of the Brotherhood of Railway Carmen, W.H. Sebring of the Order of Railroad Conductors, Frank W. Arnold of the Brotherhood of Locomotive Firemen, Henry Walton of the Brotherhood of Locomotive Engineers, James A. Clark of the Railway Telegraphers and Louis W. Rogers of the magazine Age of Labor.

A convention to introduce the new union to the broader public and to build organizational momentum was scheduled and held in Chicago on June 20, 1893. A mass meeting of railroad employees was held in conjunction with the gathering, meeting at Uhlich's Hall in Chicago at 8 pm, where it was addressed by Eugene Debs and others.

At the ARU's first annual convention, Debs proposed to allow black people to join the union, but it failed on a 113 to 102 vote. Debs later blamed the organization's racism as one of the reasons for its failure in the Pullman Strike.

=== Structure ===
Advertisement for pins and fobs bearing the emblems of the ARU

The ARU was to be divided into 12 regional districts, each of which maintained a headquarters office in a local urban center. These districts were to in turn be subdivided, apparently on a state basis, with the organization to be governed by annual state conventions and a quadrennial national convention of the entire organization. These national conventions were to choose a governing Board of Directors for the organization and to elect officers.

Only one official national convention of the ARU was held; this convened at Fisher's Hall in Chicago at 10 o'clock on the morning of June 12, 1894. About 400 delegates were in attendance—too many for the venue, which caused the gathering to be immediately moved after convocation to the more spacious room at Uhlich's Hall. There the assembled delegates heard a lengthy keynote address delivered by ARU President Gene Debs before adjourning for additional meetings in secret session.

=== Great Northern Railway strike ===
Beginning in August 1893, the Great Northern Railway enacted a series of wage cuts for its workers, reductions amounting to $146,500 per month. The American Railway Union organized all classes of employees of the road in a strike action lasting 18 days and forcing the company to arbitration of its unilateral wage cuts.

The arbitrators, consisting of businessmen from St. Paul and Minneapolis, Minnesota, found in favor of the Great Northern workers, thereby pressuring the company to roll back its wage cuts. It was the ARU's first and only victory.

=== Pullman Strike ===
Buoyed by the success of the Great Northern strike, railway workers on other lines sought similar redress of their grievances through strike action. Debs and other union officials were concerned that other disruptions were inopportune, with the union needing a brief respite to better organize itself and to restore its finances. However, this was not to be because on May 11, 1894, the workers of the Pullman Palace Car Company launched a wildcat strike against their employer.

The Pullman Company had begun a company town on the outskirts of Chicago called Pullman, Illinois, incorporated into the city of Chicago in 1889. The company and town were namesakes of its millionaire owner, George Pullman. The town of Pullman was his "utopia". He owned the land, homes and stores. Workers had to live in his homes and buy from his stores, thereby ensuring virtually all wages returned directly back into his pockets.

Although initially opposed to the strike, Debs responded to notice of the strike of the Pullman workers by traveling to Chicago to investigate the situation in person. Debs later recalled in sworn testimony:

I found that the wages and expenses of the employees were so adjusted that every dollar the employees earned found its way back into the Pullman coffers; that they were not only not getting wages enough to live on, but that they were daily getting deeper into the debt of the Pullman company; that it was impossible for many of them to leave there at all... Wages had been reduced, but the expenses remained the same, and no matter how offensive the conditions were they were compelled to submit to them. After I heard those statements I satisfied myself that they were true and I made up my mind, as president of the American Railway Union, of which these employees were members, to do everything in my power that was within law and within justice to right the wrongs of those employees.

An effort was made by the ARU to engage the Pullman Company and its workers in arbitration, but the officers of the company refused to submit to the proposal, instead claiming that they had nothing to arbitrate. Railway workers had lost confidence in the existing network of craft-based railway brotherhoods—which were essentially fraternal benefit societies—to resist an industry-wide wage reduction campaign coordinated by the railway managers' association and looked to the fledgling ARU as a mechanism to stem the tide. Sympathy for the Pullman Company workers was widespread among other workers in the railroad industry.

The ARU's constitutionally-required biannual convention was forthcoming and delegates representing the 465 locals of the union—which claimed a total membership of about 150,000—assembled in the city to take up matters of concern to the organization. During the course of the proceedings, the situation of the Pullman workers came before the assembly, which appointed a committee of Pullman employees to study the situation.

On June 21, 1894, two days prior to adjournment of the convention, the Pullman Committee reported that the company continued to refuse to arbitrate its unilateral wage cuts. The committee recommended that an ultimatum be delivered that unless the Pullman Company began arbitration within 5 days, a boycott of railroad workers should be launched under which no member of the ARU would handle a train to which Pullman cars were attached. After discussion this proposal was accepted by majority vote of the convention and a strike deadline was scheduled for June 26.

The June 26 deadline came and still the Pullman Company refused to arbitrate its wage reductions. Railway employees began to refuse to handle trains pulling Pullman cars. The ARU established temporary strike headquarters in Chicago to keep more closely abreast of the situation. Chicago became a constant mass of meetings as workers of the various railway crafts gathered to discuss the strike situation. The railway switchmen were the first to act, refusing to attach Pullman cars to trains. When one switchman would be fired for insubordination, all the others in the shop would quit, in accord with a previously agreed upon plan.

The railway managers took to the courts for relief, gaining a sweeping injunction against the ARU which was served upon union president Debs on July 2. Terms of the injunction prohibited the union from sending out any telegram or letter or issuing any order which would have the effect of inducing or persuading railroad workers to withhold their service in pursuit of the strike action.

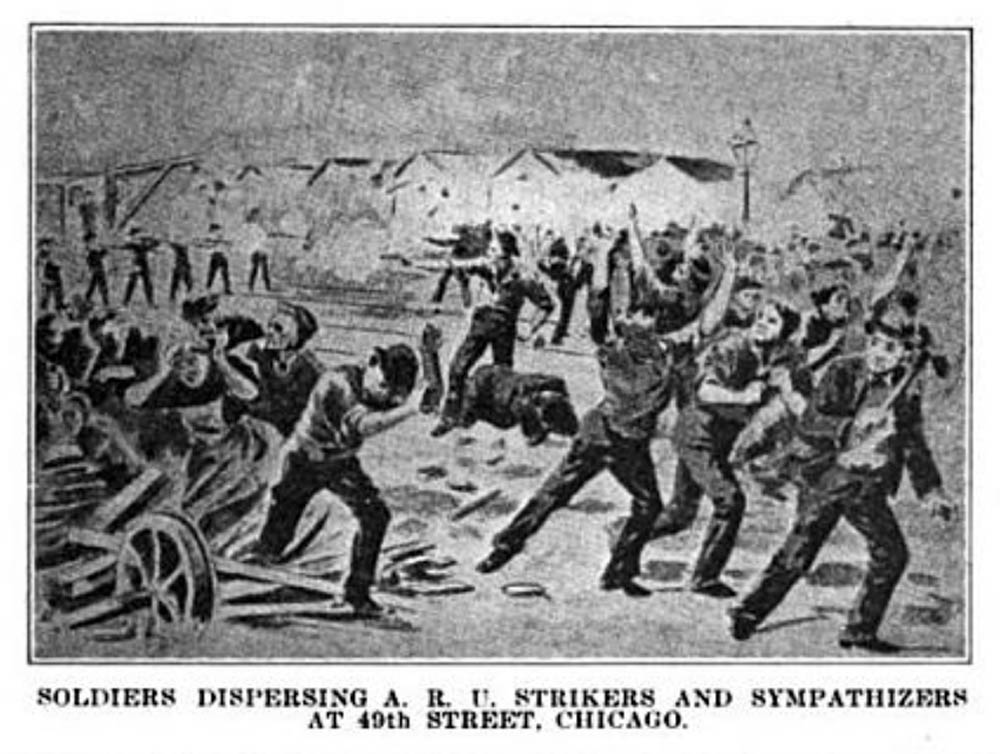
The 1894 Pullman Strike of the ARU being dispersed by soldiers

The rationale for this legal action lay in the fact that the Mail was transported by rail—transport which was interrupted when trains including Pullman cars were stopped in their tracks. Under the Sherman Anti-Trust Act of 1890, which ruled it illegal for any business combination to restrain trade or commerce, an injunction was issued on July 2 enjoining the ARU leadership from "compelling or inducing by threats, intimidation, persuasion, force or violence, railway employees to refuse or fail to perform their duties". The next day, President Cleveland ordered 20,000 federal troops to crush the strike and run the railways.

=== Transition to a political party ===
By July 7, Debs and ten other ARU leaders were arrested and later tried and convicted for conspiracy to halt the free flow of mail. The strike was finally crushed while the board and president spent six months in prison in Woodstock, Illinois. Pullman reopened with all labor union leaders sacked.

During Debs' time in jail, he spent much of his time reading socialist texts like that of Edward Bellamy. Karl Marx's book Capital: A Critique of Political Economy was brought to Debs by Victor L. Berger and had a particularly deep impact on Debs. After Debs got out of jail, he merged the ARU with the Brotherhood of the Co-operative Commonwealth to form the Social Democracy of America (SDA). In 1900, Martin J. Elliott ran for Congressman in Montana and Debs ran for President heading the SDA ticket. Elliott was later elected to the Montana Legislature while Debs ran unsuccessfully four more times for the presidency as a socialist.

== See also ==
- Brotherhood of Locomotive Firemen and Enginemen
- List of American railway unions

== Works cited ==
- Foner, Philip (1977). American Socialism and Black Americans: From The Age of Jackson to World War II. Greenwood Publishing Group. ISBN 0837195454.
