= Eugene V. Debs =

American labor and political leader (1855–1926)

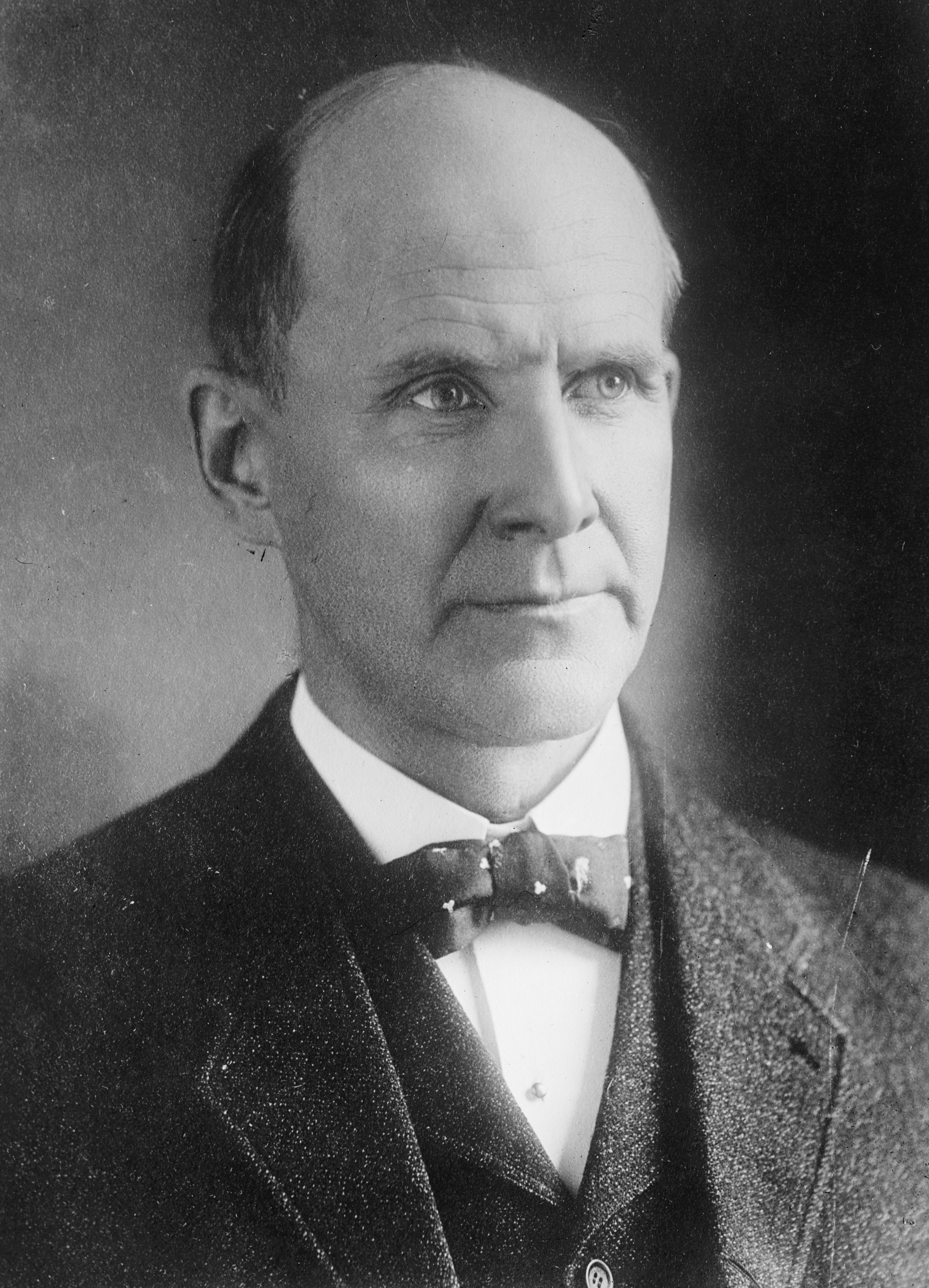
- Debs, c. 1912

National Chairman of the Socialist Party of America
- In office July 8, 1924 – October 20, 1926
- Preceded by: Office established
- Succeeded by: Victor L. Berger

President of the American Railway Union
- In office April 17, 1893 – June 15, 1897
- Preceded by: Office established
- Succeeded by: Office abolished

Grand Secretary and Treasurer of the Brotherhood of Locomotive Firemen
- In office July 13, 1880 – February 1, 1893
- Preceded by: William N. Sayre
- Succeeded by: Frank W. Arnold

Member of the Indiana House of Representatives from the 17th district
- In office January 8, 1885 – January 6, 1887 Serving with Reuben Butz
- Preceded by: Multi-member district
- Succeeded by: Multi-member district

City Clerk of Terre Haute, Indiana
- In office September 1879 – September 1883

Personal details
- Born: Eugene Victor Debs; November 5, 1855 Terre Haute, Indiana, U.S.
- Died: October 20, 1926 (aged 70) Elmhurst, Illinois, U.S.
- Resting place: Highland Lawn Cemetery
- Party: Democratic (1870s–1894); Populist (1894–1896); Social Democracy (1897–1898); Social Democratic (1898–1901); Socialist (1901–1926)
- Spouse: Kate Metzel (m. 1885)
- Relatives: Theodore Debs (brother)
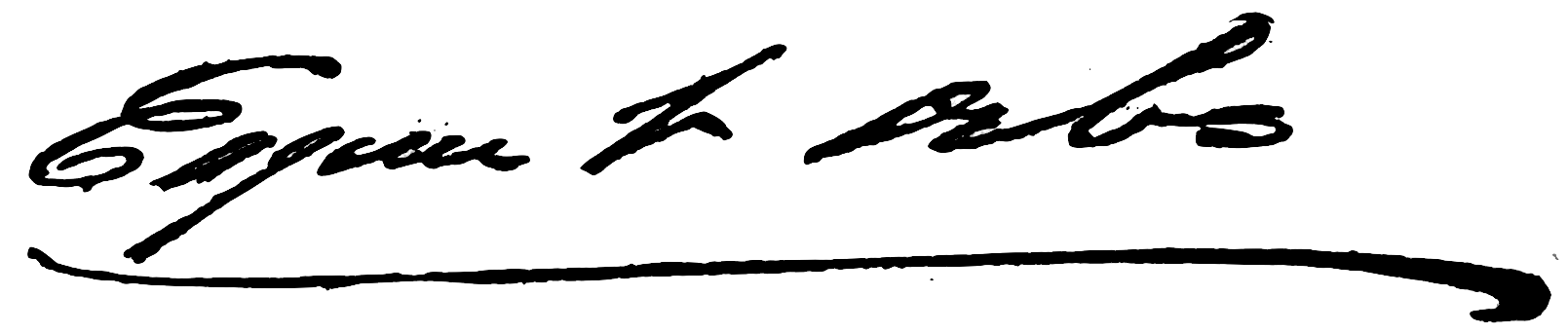
- Signature

Eugene Victor Debs (November 5, 1855 – October 20, 1926) was an American socialist activist and trade unionist. He was one of the founding members of the Industrial Workers of the World (IWW) and a five-time candidate of the Socialist Party of America for President of the United States; through his presidential candidacies as well as his work with labor movements, Debs eventually became one of the best-known socialists living in the United States.

Early in his political career, Debs was a member of the Democratic Party. He was elected as a Democrat to the Indiana General Assembly in 1884. After working with several smaller unions, including the Brotherhood of Locomotive Firemen, Debs led his union in a major ten-month strike against the CB&Q Railroad in 1888. Debs was instrumental in the founding of the American Railway Union (ARU), one of the nation's first industrial unions. After workers at the Pullman Palace Car Company organized a wildcat strike over pay cuts in the summer of 1894, Debs signed many into the ARU. He led a boycott by the ARU against handling trains with Pullman cars in what became the nationwide Pullman Strike, affecting most lines west of Detroit and more than 250,000 workers in 27 states. Purportedly to keep the mail running, President Grover Cleveland used the United States Army to break the strike. As a leader of the ARU, Debs was convicted of federal charges for defying a court injunction against the strike and served six months in prison.

In prison, Debs read various works of socialist theory and emerged six months later as a committed adherent of the international socialist movement. Debs was a founding member of the Social Democracy of America (1897), the Social Democratic Party of America (1898) and the Socialist Party of America (1901). Debs ran as a Socialist candidate for President of the United States five times: 1900 (earning 0.6 percent of the popular vote), 1904 (3.0 percent), 1908 (2.8 percent), 1912 (6.0 percent), and 1920 (3.4 percent), the last time from a prison cell. He was also a candidate for United States Congress from his home state Indiana in 1916.

Debs was noted for his oratorical skills, and his speech denouncing American participation in World War I would lead to his second arrest in 1918. He was convicted under the Sedition Act of 1918 and stripped of his U.S. citizenship for encouraging young men to evade the draft. He was sentenced to two 10-year prison terms. President Warren G. Harding commuted his sentence in December 1921, but did not have his citizenship restored during his lifetime. Debs died in 1926, not long after being admitted to a sanatorium due to cardiovascular problems that had developed during his time in prison.

== Early life ==
Eugene Victor "Gene" Debs was born on November 5, 1855, in Terre Haute, Indiana, to Jean Daniel and Marguerite Mari Bettrich Debs, who emigrated to the United States from Colmar, Alsace, France. His father, who came from a prosperous Protestant family, owned a textile mill and meat market. Debs was named after the French authors Eugène Sue and Victor Hugo.

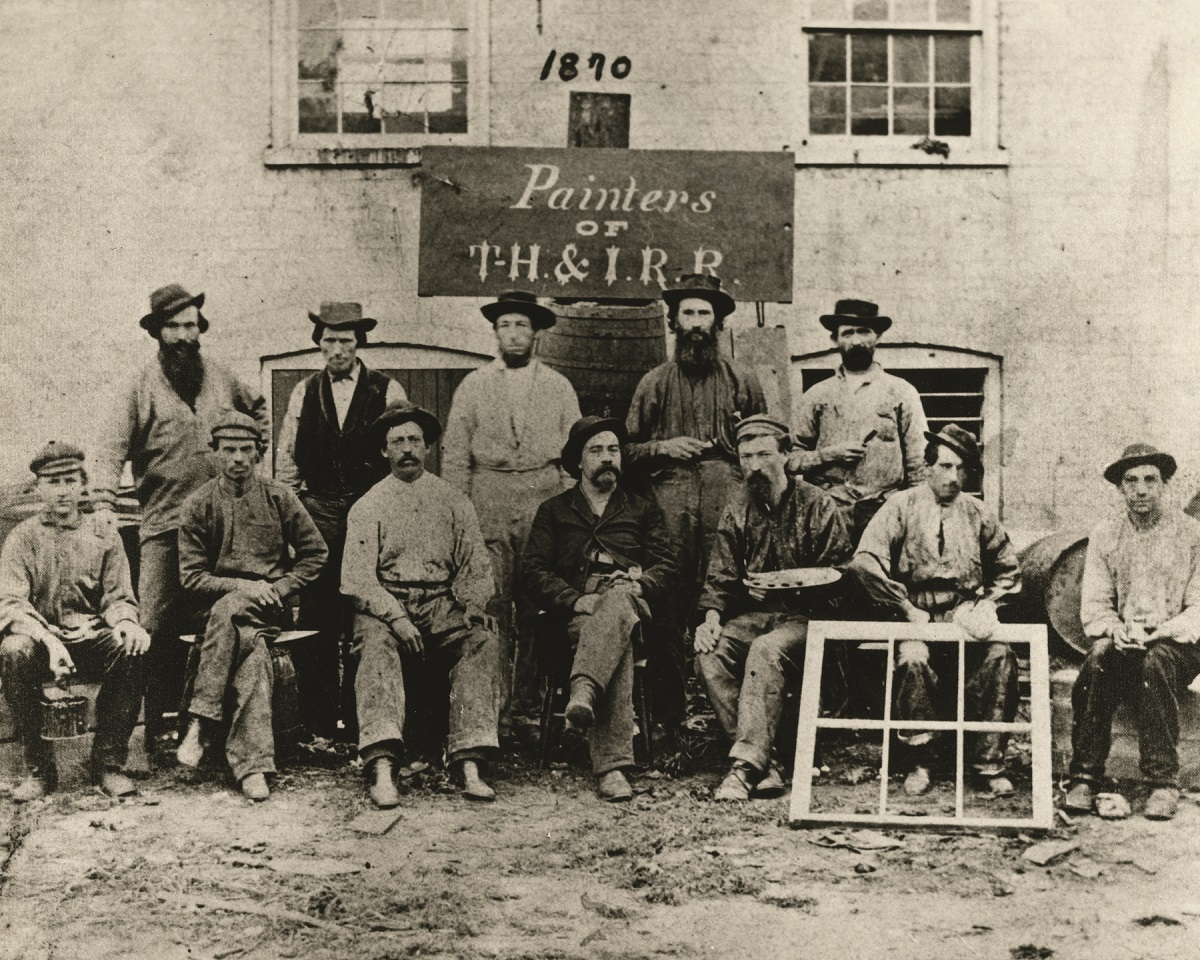
Debs (seated far left) and painters for the Vandalia Railroad in 1870

Debs attended public school, dropping out of high school at age 14. He took a job with the Vandalia Railroad cleaning grease from the trucks of freight engines for fifty cents a day. He later became a painter and car cleaner in the railroad shops. In December 1871, when a drunken locomotive fireman failed to report for work, Debs was pressed into service as a night fireman. He decided to remain a fireman on the run between Terre Haute and Indianapolis, earning more than a dollar a night for the next three and half years. In July 1875, Debs left to work at a wholesale grocery house, where he remained for four years while attending a local business school at night.

Debs joined the Brotherhood of Locomotive Firemen (BLF) in February 1875 and became active in the organization. In 1877 he served as a delegate of the Terre Haute lodge to the organization's national convention. Debs was elected associate editor of the BLF's monthly organ, Firemen's Magazine, in 1878. Two years later, he was appointed Grand Secretary and Treasurer of the BLF and editor of the magazine in July 1880. He worked as a BLF functionary until February 1893 and as the magazine's editor until September 1894.

At the same time, he became a prominent figure in the community. He served two terms as Terre Haute's city clerk from September 1879 to September 1883. In the autumn of 1884, he was elected as a Democrat to represent Terre Haute and Vigo County in the Indiana General Assembly. He served for one term in 1885.

=== Marriage and family ===
Debs married Katherine "Kate" Metzel on June 9, 1885, at St. Stephen's Episcopal church. Their home still stands in Terre Haute, preserved on the campus of Indiana State University.

== Labor activism ==
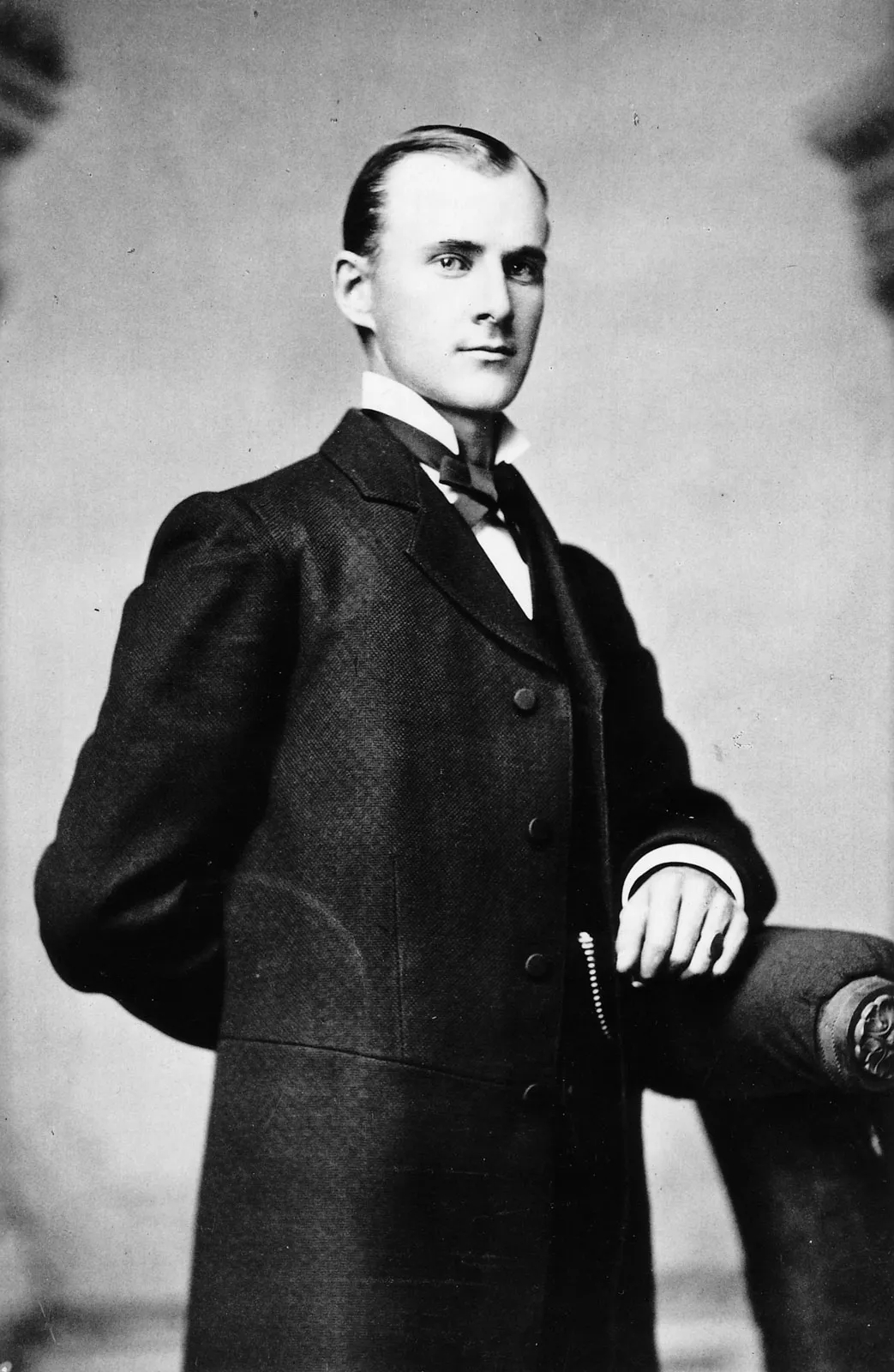
Debs as a young man

The railroad brotherhoods were comparatively conservative organizations, focused on providing fellowship and services rather than on collective bargaining. Their motto was "Benevolence, Sobriety, and Industry". As editor of the official journal of the Brotherhood of Locomotive Firemen, Debs initially concentrated on improving the brotherhood's death-and-disability-insurance programs. During the early 1880s, Debs's writing stressed themes of self-uplift: temperance, hard work, and honesty. Debs also held the view that "labor and capital are friends" and opposed strikes as a means of settling differences. The brotherhood had never authorized a strike from its founding in 1873 to 1887, a record of which Debs was proud. Railroad companies cultivated the brotherhood and granted them perks like free transportation to their conventions for the delegates. Debs also invited railroad president Henry C. Lord to write for the magazine. Summarizing Debs's thought in this period, the historian David A. Shannon wrote: "Debs's desideratum was one of peace and co-operation between labor and capital, but he expected management to treat labor with respect, honor and social equality".

Debs gradually became convinced of the need for a more unified and confrontational approach as railroads were powerful forces in the economy. One influence was his involvement in the Burlington Railroad Strike of 1888, a defeat for labor that convinced Debs of "the need to reorganize across craft lines", according to Joanne Reitano. After stepping down as Brotherhood Grand Secretary in 1893, Debs organized one of the first industrial unions in the United States, the American Railway Union (ARU), for unskilled workers. He was elected president of the ARU upon its founding, with fellow railway labor organizer George W. Howard as first vice president. The union successfully struck the Great Northern Railway in April 1894, winning most of its demands.

=== Pullman Strike ===
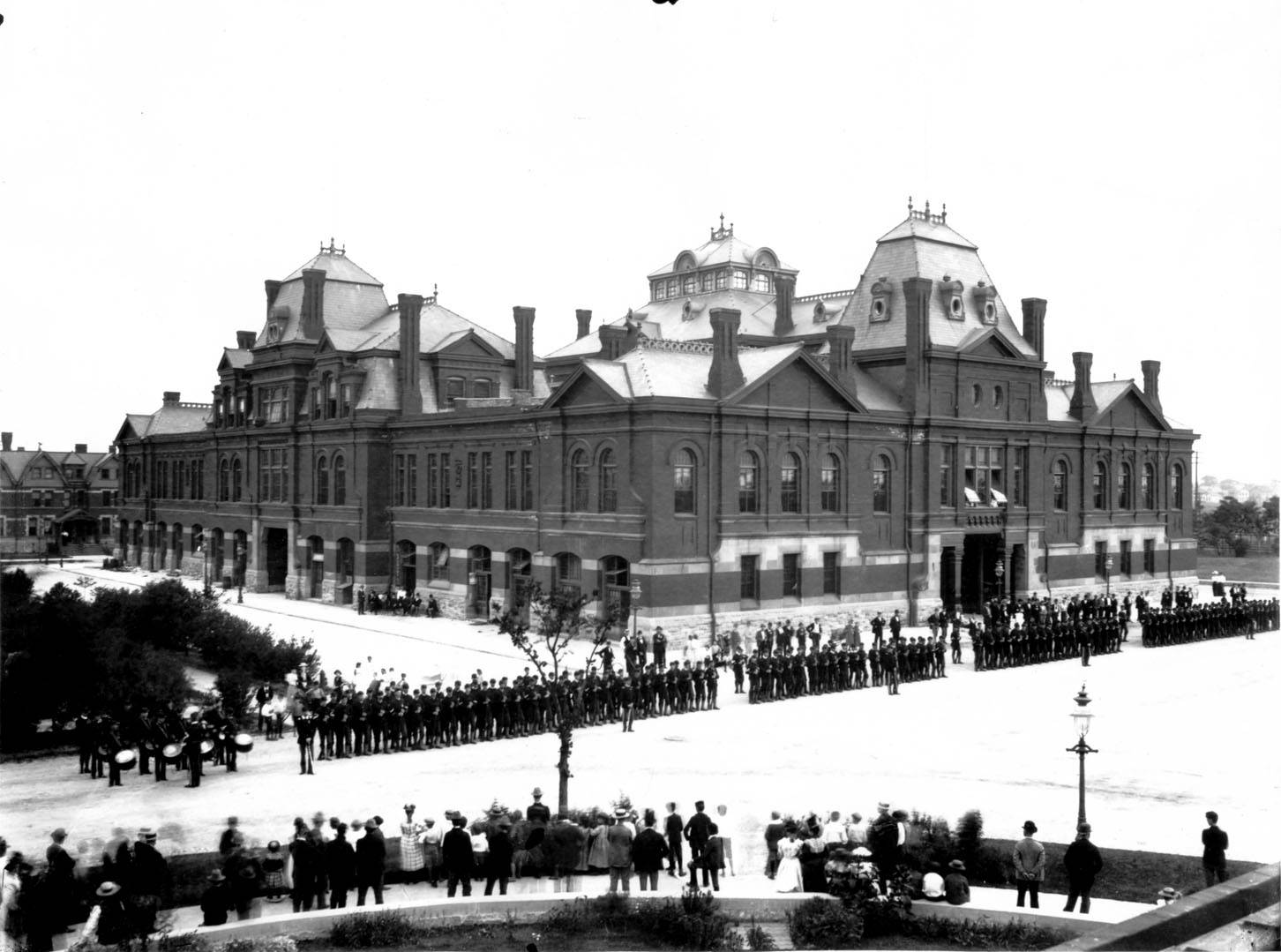
Striking American Railway Union (ARU) members confront Illinois National Guard troops in Chicago during Debs's rebellion in 1894.

In 1894, Debs became involved in the Pullman Strike, which grew out of a compensation dispute started by the workers who constructed the rail cars made by the Pullman Palace Car Company. The Pullman Company, citing falling revenue after the economic Panic of 1893, had cut the wages of its factory employees by twenty-eight percent. The workers, many of whom were already members of the ARU, appealed for support to the union at its convention in Chicago, Illinois. Debs tried to persuade union members, who worked on the railways, that the boycott was too risky given the hostility of the railways and the federal government, the weakness of the union, and the possibility that other unions would break the strike.

The membership ignored his warnings and refused to handle Pullman cars or any other railroad cars attached to them, including cars containing the U.S. mail. After ARU Board Director Martin J. Elliott extended the strike to St. Louis, doubling its size to eighty thousand workers, Debs relented and decided to take part in the strike, which was now endorsed by almost all members of the ARU in the immediate area of Chicago. On July 9, 1894, a New York Times editorial called Debs "a lawbreaker at large, an enemy of the human race". Strikers fought by establishing boycotts of Pullman train cars and with Debs's eventual leadership the strike came to be known as "Debs' Rebellion".

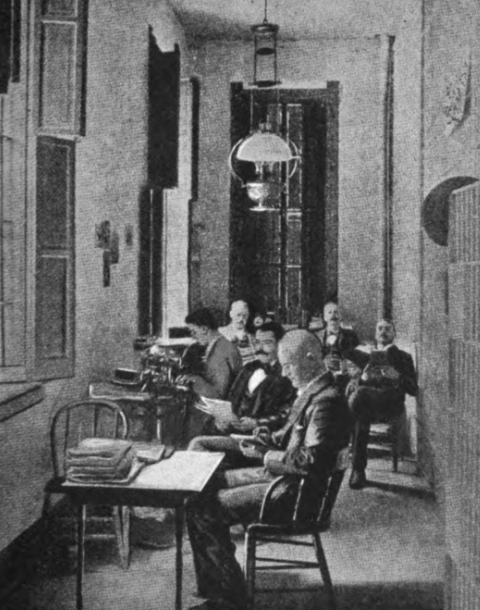
Debs while in prison in Woodstock, Illinois, in 1895

The federal government intervened, obtaining an injunction against the strike on the grounds that the strikers had obstructed the U.S. mail, carried on Pullman cars, by refusing to show up for work. President Grover Cleveland, whom Debs had supported in all three of his presidential campaigns, sent the United States Army to enforce the injunction. The presence of the army was enough to break the strike. Overall, thirty strikers were killed in the strike, thirteen of them in Chicago, and thousands were blacklisted. An estimated $80 million worth of property was damaged and Debs was found guilty of contempt of court for violating the injunction and sent to federal prison.

Debs was represented by Clarence Darrow, later a leading American lawyer and civil libertarian, who had previously been a corporate lawyer for the railroad company. Although it is commonly thought that Darrow "switched sides" to represent Debs, a myth repeated by Irving Stone's biography, Clarence Darrow for the Defense, he had in fact resigned from the railroad earlier, after the death of his mentor William Goudy. A Supreme Court case decision, In re Debs, later upheld the right of the federal government to issue the injunction.

== Socialist leader ==
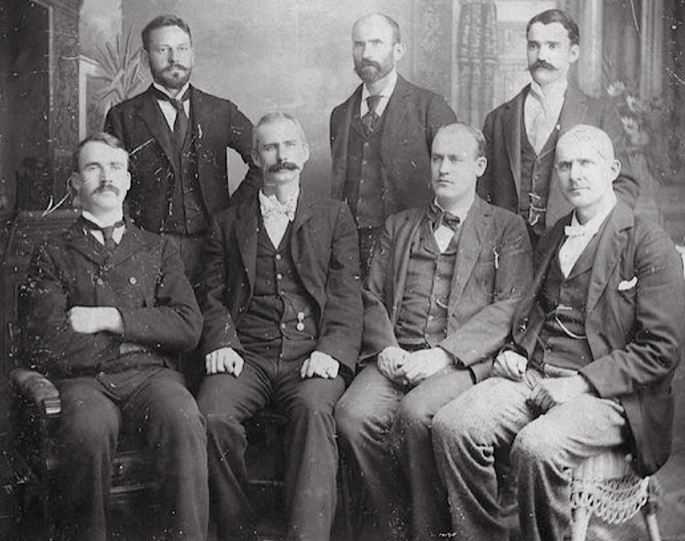
Seven of the eight officers of the American Railway Union jailed in connection with the 1894 Pullman Strike. (Standing, L-R): George W. Howard, Martin J. Elliott, Sylvester Keliher. (Seated, L-R): William E. Burns, James Hogan, Roy M. Goodwin, Eugene V. Debs. Not Shown: L. W. Rogers.

At the time of his arrest for mail obstruction, Debs was not yet a socialist. While serving his six-month term in the jail at Woodstock, Illinois, Debs and his ARU comrades received a steady stream of letters, books and pamphlets in the mail from socialists around the country. Debs recalled several years later:

I began to read and think and dissect the anatomy of the system in which workingmen, however organized, could be shattered and battered and splintered at a single stroke. The writings of [Edward] Bellamy and [Robert] Blatchford early appealed to me. The Cooperative Commonwealth of [Laurence] Gronlund also impressed me, but the writings of [Karl] Kautsky were so clear and conclusive that I readily grasped, not merely his argument, but also caught the spirit of his socialist utterance – and I thank him and all who helped me out of darkness into light.

Additionally, Debs was visited in jail by the Milwaukee socialist newspaper editor Victor L. Berger, who in Debs's words "came to Woodstock, as if a providential instrument, and delivered the first impassioned message of Socialism I had ever heard". In his 1926 obituary in Time, it was said that Berger left him a copy of Capital and "prisoner Debs read it slowly, eagerly, ravenously". Debs emerged from jail at the end of his sentence a changed man. He spent the final three decades of his life proselytizing for the socialist cause.

After Debs and Martin Elliott were released from prison in 1895, Debs started his socialist political career. Debs started agitating for the ARU membership to form a social democratic organization. In 1896, Debs supported Democratic candidate William Jennings Bryan in the presidential election following Bryan's Cross of Gold speech. After Bryan's loss in the election, a disappointed Debs decided for certain that the future for socialist policies lay outside the Democratic Party. In June 1897, the ARU membership finally joined with the Brotherhood of the Cooperative Commonwealth to form the Social Democracy of America.

=== Split to found the Social Democratic Party ===
The Social Democracy of America (SDA), founded in June 1897 by Eugene V. Debs from the remnants of his American Railway Union, was deeply divided between those who favored a tactic of launching a series of colonies to build socialism by practical example and others who favored establishment of a European-style socialist political party with a view to capture of the government apparatus through the ballot box.

The June 1898 convention would be the group's last, with the minority political action wing quitting the organization to establish a new organization, the Social Democratic Party of America (SDP), also called the Social Democratic Party of the United States. Debs was elected to the National Executive Board, the five-member committee which governed the party, and his brother, Theodore Debs, was selected as its paid executive secretary, handling day-to-day affairs of the organization. Although by no means the sole decision-maker in the organization, Debs's status as prominent public figure in the aftermath of the Pullman strike provided cachet and made him the recognized spokesman for the party in the newspapers.

=== Presidential elections ===
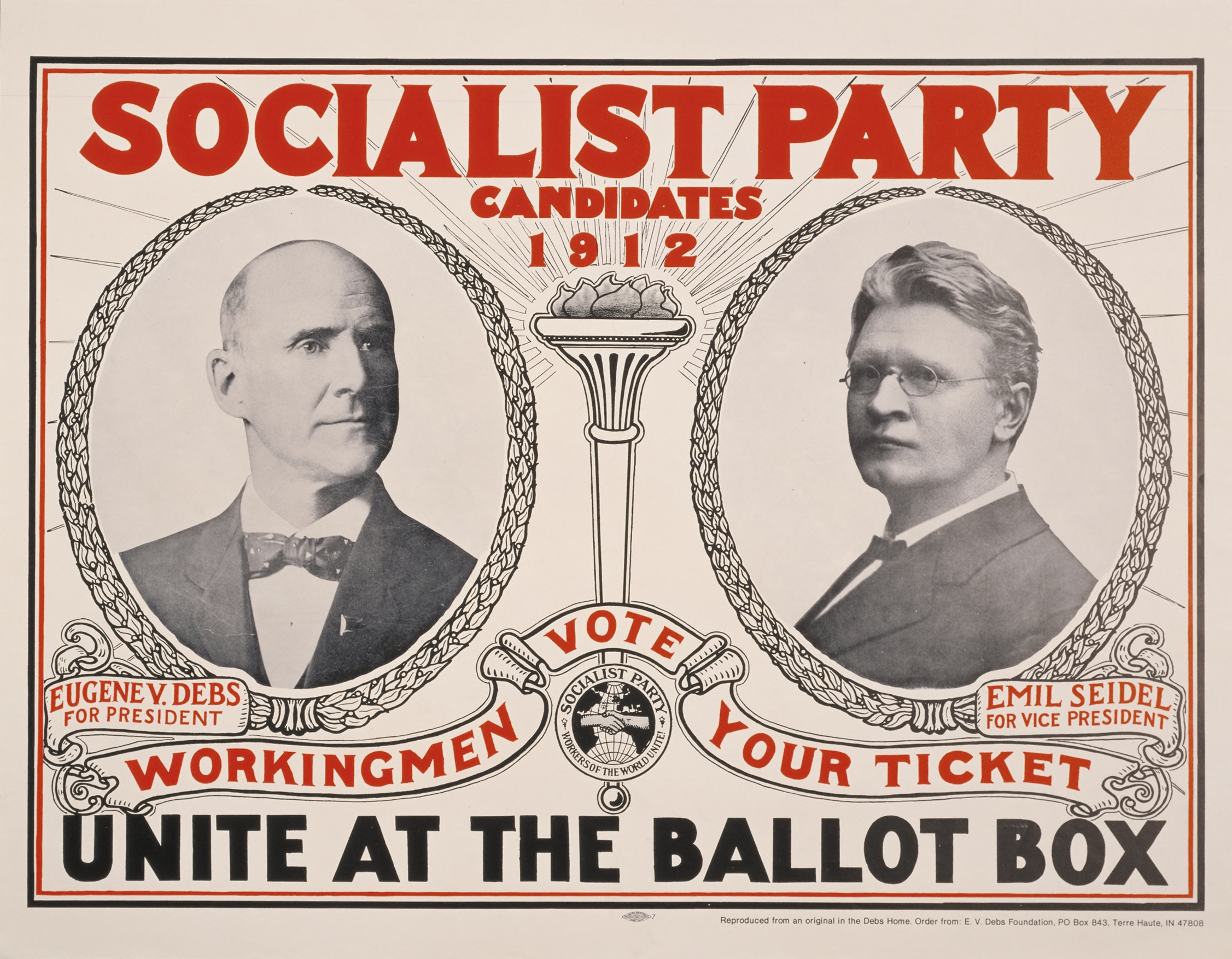
Campaign poster from his 1912 presidential campaign featuring Debs and vice presidential candidate Emil Seidel

Along with Elliott, who ran for Congress in 1900, Debs was the first federal office candidate for the fledgling socialist party, running unsuccessfully for president the same year. Debs and his running mate Job Harriman received 87,945 votes (0.6 percent of the popular vote) and no electoral votes.

Following the 1900 Election, the Social Democratic Party and dissidents who had split from the Socialist Labor Party in 1899 unified forces at a Socialist Unity Convention held in Indianapolis in mid-1901 – a meeting which established the Socialist Party of America (SPA).

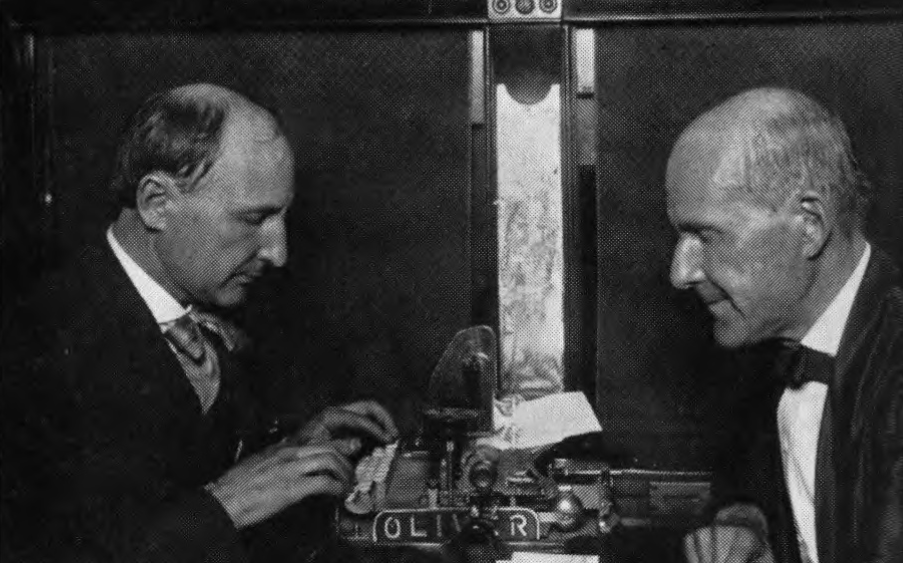
Debs with his brother Theodore Debs while he was running for president in the 1908 election

Debs was the Socialist Party of America candidate for president in 1904, 1908, 1912, and 1920 (the final time from prison). Though he received increasing numbers of popular votes in each subsequent election, he never won any votes in the Electoral College. In both 1904 and 1908, Debs ran with running-mate Ben Hanford. They received 402,810 votes in 1904, for 3.0 percent of the popular vote and an overall third-place finish. In the 1908 election, they received a slightly higher number of votes (420,852) than in their previous run, but at 2.8 percent, a smaller percentage of the total votes cast. In 1912, Debs ran with Milwaukee mayor Emil Seidel as a running mate and received 901,551 votes, which was 6.0 percent of the popular vote, which remains the all-time highest percentage of the vote for a Socialist Party candidate in a U.S. presidential election. Though Debs won no state's electoral votes, in Florida, he came in second behind Wilson and ahead of President William Howard Taft and former President Theodore Roosevelt. Being nominated a fourth time at the party's 1920 convention, Debs ran his final presidential campaign with Seymour Stedman as his running mate. In 1920, Debs won 914,191 votes (3.4%), which remains the all-time high number of votes for a Socialist Party candidate in a U.S. presidential election. Notably, the Nineteenth Amendment passed in 1920, granting women the federal right to vote across the country, and with the expanded voting pool, his vote total accounted for only 3.4 percent of the total number of votes cast. The size of the vote is nevertheless remarkable since Debs was at the time a federal prisoner in jail for sedition, though he promised to pardon himself if elected.

Although he received some success as a third-party candidate, Debs was largely dismissive of the electoral process as he distrusted the political bargains that Victor Berger and other "sewer socialists" had made in winning local offices. He put much more value on organizing workers into unions, favoring unions that brought together all workers in a given industry over those organized by the craft skills workers practiced.

=== Founding the Industrial Workers of the World ===
After his work with the Brotherhood of Locomotive Firemen and the American Railway Union, Debs's next major work in organizing a labor union came during the founding of the Industrial Workers of the World (IWW). On June 27, 1905, in Chicago, Illinois, Debs and other influential union leaders including Bill Haywood, leader of the Western Federation of Miners; and Daniel De Leon, leader of the Socialist Labor Party, held what Haywood called the "Continental Congress of the working class". Haywood stated: "We are here to confederate the workers of this country into a working-class movement that shall have for its purpose the emancipation of the working class". Debs stated: "We are here to perform a task so great that it appeals to our best thought, our united energies, and will enlist our most loyal support; a task in the presence of which weak men might falter and despair, but from which it is impossible to shrink without betraying the working class".

=== Socialists split with the Industrial Workers of the World ===
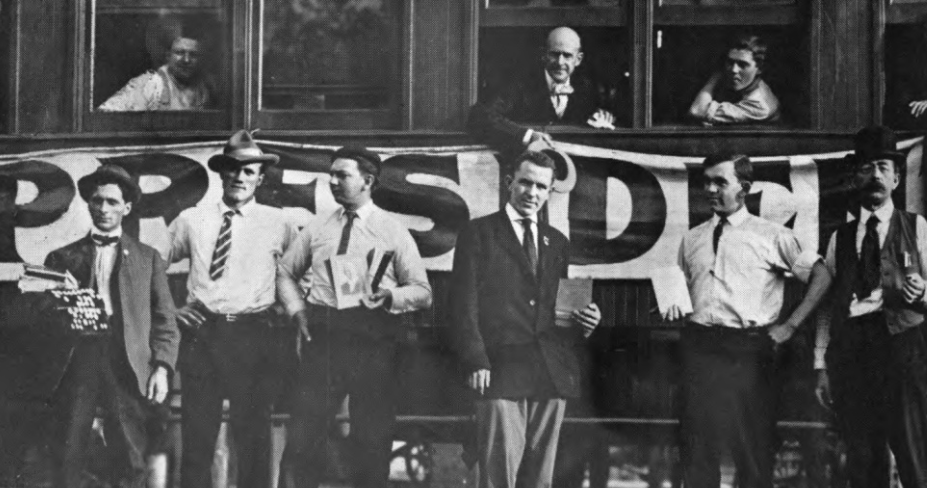
Debs during one of his presidential campaigns

Although the IWW was built on the basis of uniting workers of industry, a rift began between the union and the Socialist Party. It started when the electoral wing of the Socialist Party, led by Victor Berger and Morris Hillquit, became irritated with speeches by Haywood. In December 1911, Haywood told a Lower East Side audience at New York City's Cooper Union that parliamentary Socialists were "step-at-a-time people whose every step is just a little shorter than the preceding step". It was better, Haywood said, to "elect the superintendent of some branch of industry, than to elect some congressman to the United States Congress". In response, Hillquit attacked the IWW as "purely anarchistic".

The Cooper Union speech was the beginning of a split between Haywood and the Socialist Party, leading to the split between the factions of the IWW, one faction loyal to the Socialist Party and the other to Haywood. The rift presented a problem for Debs, who was influential in both the IWW and the Socialist Party. The final straw between Haywood and the Socialist Party came during the Lawrence Textile Strike. The decision of the elected officials in Lawrence, Massachusetts, to send police, who subsequently used their clubs on children, disgusted Haywood, who publicly declared that "I will not vote again" until such a circumstance was rectified. Haywood was purged from the National Executive Committee by passage of an amendment that focused on the direct action and sabotage tactics advocated by the IWW. Debs was probably the only person who could have saved Haywood's seat.

In 1906, when Haywood had been on trial for his life in Idaho, Debs had described him as "the Lincoln of Labor" and called for Haywood to run against Theodore Roosevelt for president, but times had changed and Debs, facing a split in the party, chose to echo Hillquit's words, accusing the IWW of representing anarchy. Debs thereafter stated that he had opposed the amendment, but that once it was adopted it should be obeyed. Debs remained friendly to Haywood and the IWW after the expulsion despite their perceived differences over IWW tactics.

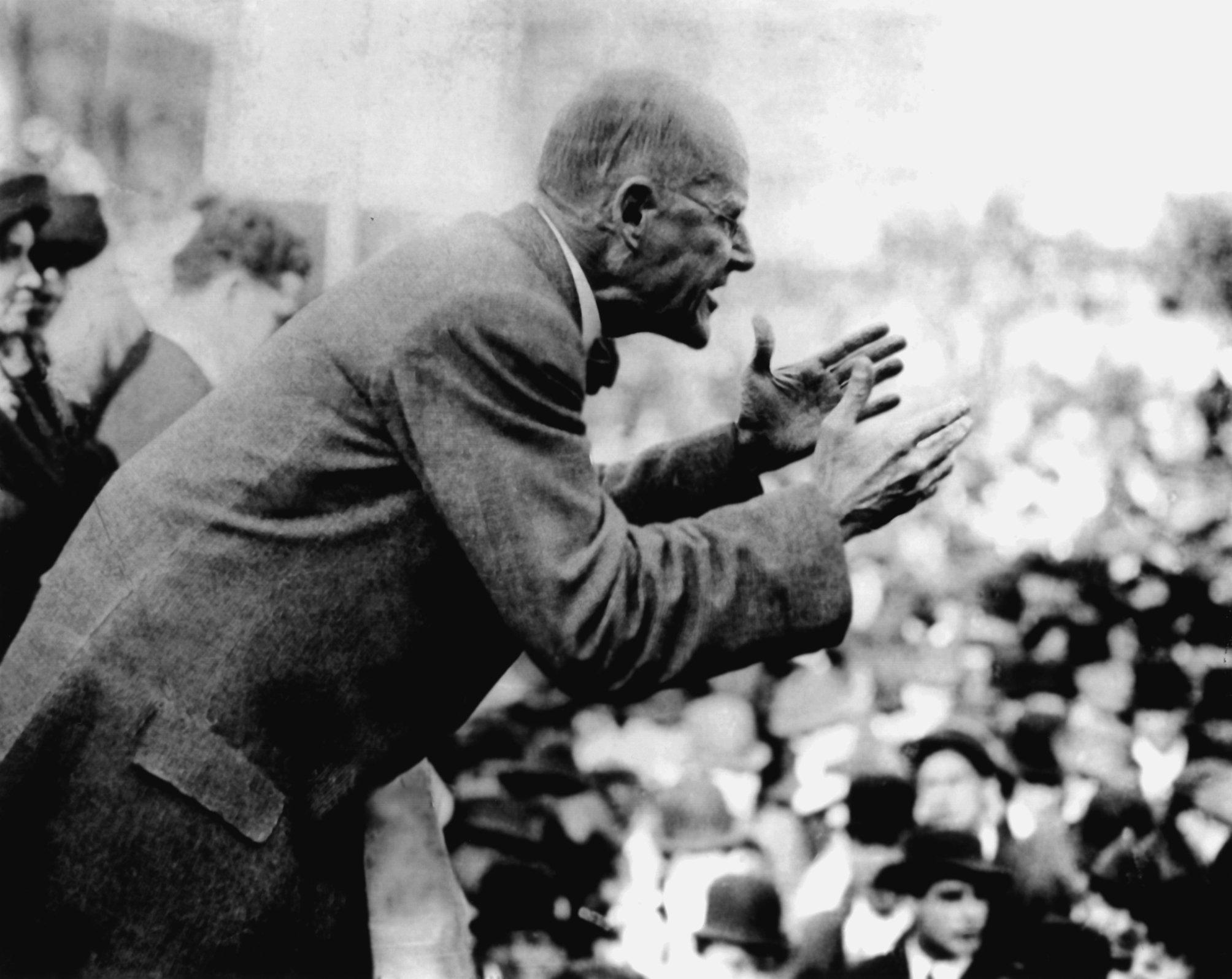
Debs speaking in Canton, Ohio, in 1918, being arrested for sedition shortly thereafter

Prior to Haywood's dismissal, the Socialist Party membership had reached an all-time high of 135,000. One year later, four months after Haywood was recalled, the membership dropped to 80,000. The reformists in the Socialist Party attributed the decline to the departure of the "Haywood element" and predicted that the party would recover, but it did not. In the election of 1912, many of the Socialists who had been elected to public office lost their seats.

=== Leadership style ===
Debs was noted by many to be a charismatic speaker who sometimes called on the vocabulary of Christianity and much of the oratorical style of evangelism, even though he was generally disdainful of organized religion. Howard Zinn opined that "Debs was what every socialist or anarchist or radical should be: fierce in his convictions, kind and compassionate in his personal relations." Heywood Broun noted in his eulogy for Debs, quoting a fellow Socialist: "That old man with the burning eyes actually believes that there can be such a thing as the brotherhood of man. And that's not the funniest part of it. As long as he's around I believe it myself".

Although sometimes called "King Debs", Debs himself was not wholly comfortable with his standing as a leader. As he told an audience in Detroit in 1906:

I am not a Labor Leader; I do not want you to follow me or anyone else; if you are looking for a Moses to lead you out of this capitalist wilderness, you will stay right where you are. I would not lead you into the promised land if I could, because if I led you in, someone else would lead you out. You must use your heads as well as your hands, and get yourself out of your present condition.

=== Sedition conviction and appeal to U.S. Supreme Court ===
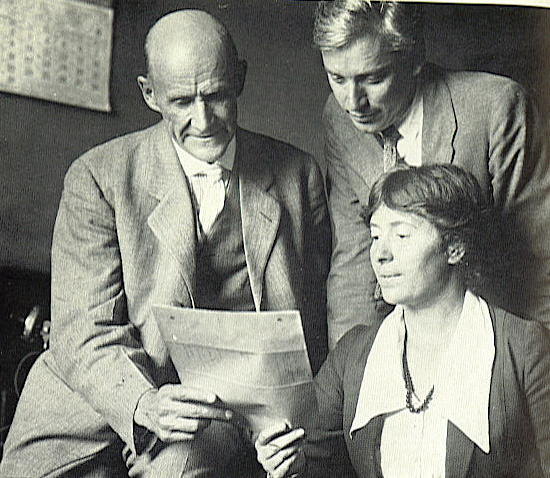
Debs with Max Eastman and Rose Pastor Stokes in 1918

Debs's speeches against the Wilson administration and the war earned the enmity of President Woodrow Wilson, who later called Debs a "traitor to his country." On June 16, 1918, Debs made a speech in Canton, Ohio, urging resistance to the military draft. He was arrested on June 30 and charged with ten counts of sedition.

Seymour Stedman headed Debs' legal defense team. Seymour Stedman, in his opening statement, stated, "We ask you to judge Eugene V. Debs by his life, his deeds and his works. If you will do that we shall abide by your verdict." His trial defense called no witnesses, asking that Debs be allowed to address the court in his defense. That unusual request was granted, and Debs spoke for two hours. He was found guilty on September 12. At his sentencing hearing on September 14, he again addressed the court and his speech has become a classic. Heywood Broun, a liberal journalist and not a Debs partisan, said it was "one of the most beautiful and moving passages in the English language. He was for that one afternoon touched with inspiration. If anyone told me that tongues of fire danced upon his shoulders as he spoke, I would believe it." Debs said in part:

Your honor, I have stated in this court that I am opposed to the form of our present government; that I am opposed to the social system in which we live; that I believe in the change of both but by perfectly peaceable and orderly means. ...

I am thinking this morning of the men in the mills and factories; I am thinking of the women who, for a paltry wage, are compelled to work out their lives; of the little children who, in this system, are robbed of their childhood, and in their early, tender years, are seized in the remorseless grasp of Mammon, and forced into the industrial dungeons, there to feed the machines while they themselves are being starved body and soul. ...

Your honor, I ask no mercy, I plead for no immunity. I realize that finally the right must prevail. I never more fully comprehended than now the great struggle between the powers of greed on the one hand and upon the other the rising hosts of freedom. I can see the dawn of a better day of humanity. The people are awakening. In due course of time they will come into their own.

When the mariner, sailing over tropic seas, looks for relief from his weary watch, he turns his eyes toward the Southern Cross, burning luridly above the tempest-vexed ocean. As the midnight approaches the Southern Cross begins to bend, and the whirling worlds change their places, and with starry finger-points the Almighty marks the passage of Time upon the dial of the universe; and though no bell may beat the glad tidings, the look-out knows that the midnight is passing – that relief and rest are close at hand.

Let the people take heart and hope everywhere, for the cross is bending, midnight is passing, and joy cometh with the morning.

Debs was sentenced on September 18, 1918, to ten years in prison and was also disenfranchised for life. Debs presented what has been called his best-remembered statement at his sentencing hearing:

Your Honor, years ago I recognized my kinship with all living beings, and I made up my mind that I was not one bit better than the meanest on earth. I said then, and I say now, that while there is a lower class, I am in it, and while there is a criminal element, I am of it, and while there is a soul in prison, I am not free.

Debs appealed his conviction to the Supreme Court. In its ruling on Debs v. United States, the court examined several statements Debs had made regarding World War I and socialism. While Debs had carefully worded his speeches in an attempt to comply with the Espionage Act of 1917, the Court found he had the intention and effect of obstructing the draft and military recruitment. Among other things, the Court cited Debs's praise for those imprisoned for obstructing the draft. Justice Oliver Wendell Holmes Jr. stated in his opinion that little attention was needed since Debs's case was essentially the same as that of Schenck v. United States, in which the court had upheld a similar conviction.

Debs went to prison on April 13, 1919. In protest of his jailing, Charles Ruthenberg led a parade of unionists, socialists, and communists on May 1 (May Day) in Cleveland, Ohio. The event quickly broke into the violent May Day riots of 1919.

=== 1920 presidential run ===
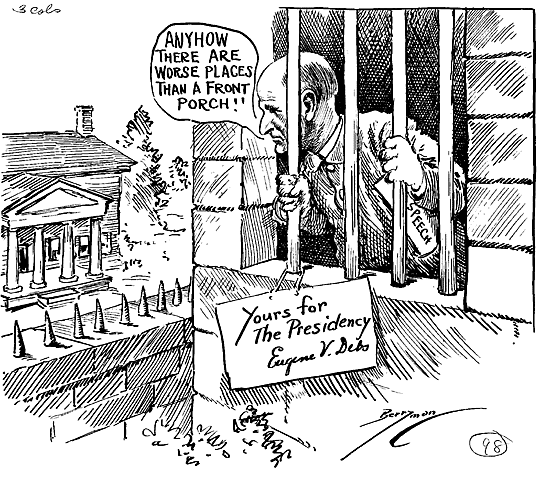
Clifford Berryman's cartoon depiction of Debs's 1920 presidential run from prison

Debs ran for president in the 1920 election while imprisoned in the Atlanta Federal Penitentiary. Campaign pins reading "For President: Convict No. 9653" accompanied his campaign. He received 914,191 votes (3.4 percent), a smaller percentage than he had won in 1912, when he received 6 percent, the highest number of votes for a Socialist Party presidential candidate in the United States. During his time in prison, Debs wrote a series of columns deeply critical of the prison system. They appeared in sanitized form in the Bell Syndicate and were published in his only book, Walls and Bars, with several added chapters. It was published posthumously.

In March 1919, President Wilson asked Attorney General A. Mitchell Palmer for his opinion on clemency, offering his own: "I doubt the wisdom and public effect of such an action." Palmer generally favored releasing people convicted under the wartime security acts, but when he consulted with Debs's prosecutors – even those with records as defenders of civil liberties – they assured him that Debs's conviction was correct and his sentence appropriate. The President and his Attorney General both believed that public opinion opposed clemency and that releasing Debs could strengthen Wilson's opponents in the debate over the ratification of the peace treaty. Palmer proposed clemency in August and October 1920 without success. At one point, Wilson wrote: "While the flower of American youth was pouring out its blood to vindicate the cause of civilization, this man, Debs, stood behind the lines sniping, attacking, and denouncing them. ... This man was a traitor to his country and he will never be pardoned during my administration." In January 1921, Palmer, citing Debs's deteriorating health, proposed to Wilson that Debs receive a presidential pardon freeing him on February 12, Lincoln's birthday. Wilson returned the paperwork after writing "Denied" across it.

In March 1921, soon after the inauguration of President Warren G. Harding, Debs met Harding's Attorney General Harry Daugherty, but was returned to jail afterwards.

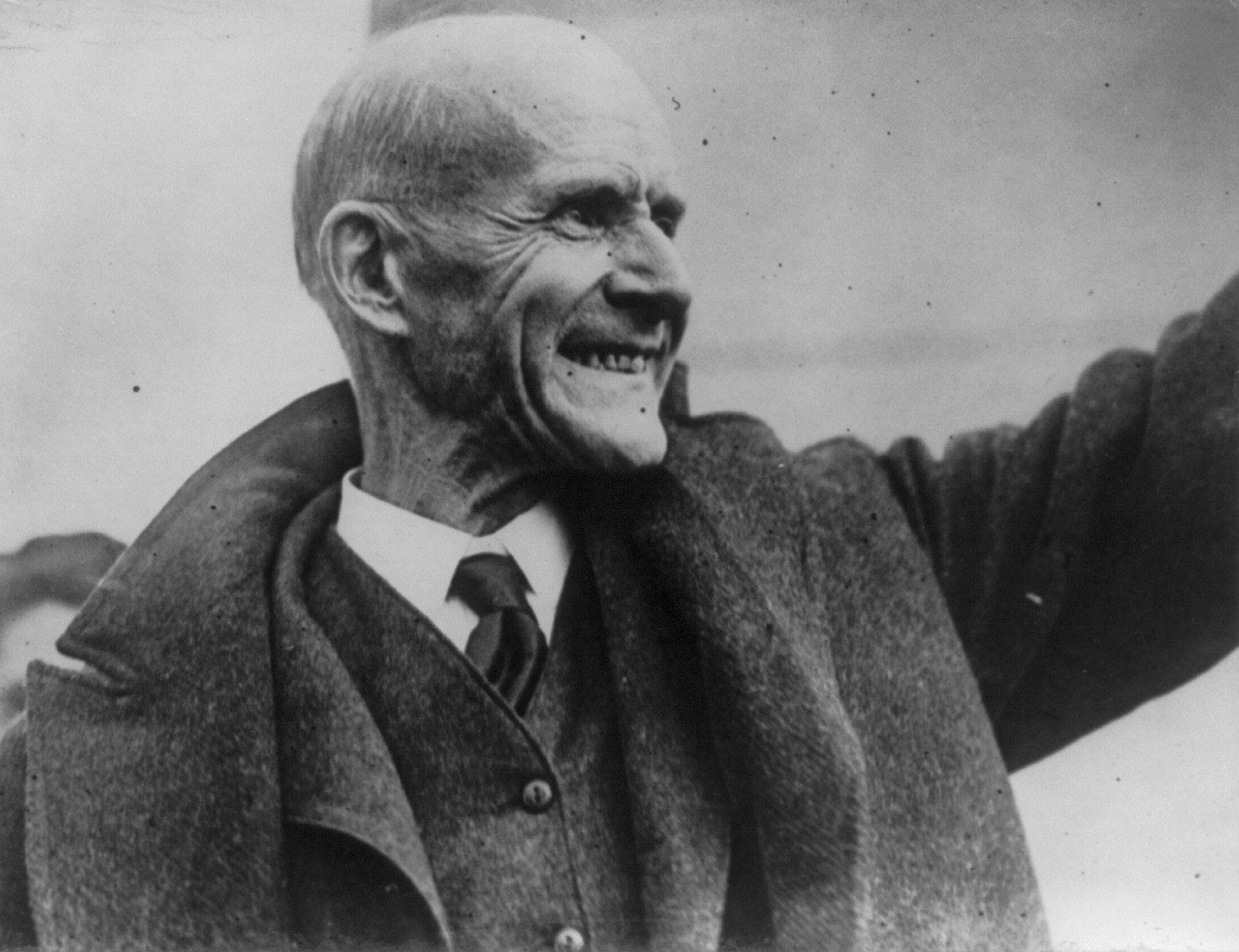
Debs leaving the federal penitentiary in Atlanta on Christmas Day 1921 following commutation of his sentence

On December 23, 1921, President Harding commuted Debs's sentence to time served, effective Christmas Day. He did not issue a pardon. A White House statement summarized the administration's view of Debs's case:

There is no question of his guilt. ... He was by no means, however, as rabid and outspoken in his expressions as many others, and but for his prominence and the resulting far-reaching effect of his words, very probably might not have received the sentence he did. He is an old man, not strong physically. He is a man of much personal charm and impressive personality, which qualifications make him a dangerous man calculated to mislead the unthinking and affording excuse for those with criminal intent.

=== Last years ===
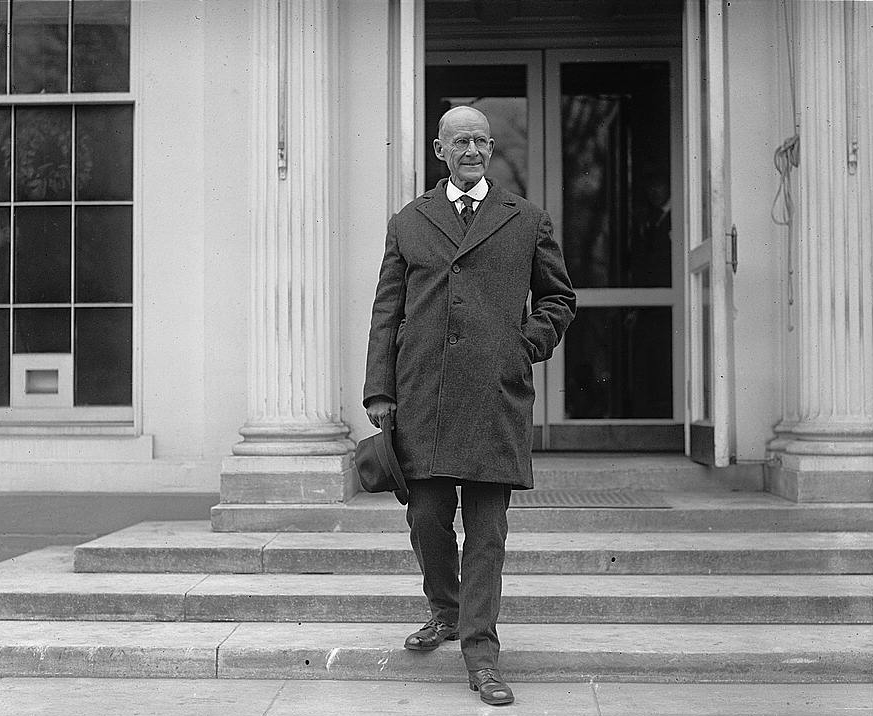
Debs leaving the White House the day after being released from prison in 1921

When Debs was released from the Atlanta Penitentiary, the other prisoners sent him off with "a roar of cheers" and a crowd of fifty thousand greeted his return to Terre Haute to the accompaniment of band music. En route home, Debs was warmly received at the White House by Harding, who greeted him by saying: "Well, I've heard so damned much about you, Mr. Debs, that I am now glad to meet you personally."

In 1924, Debs was nominated for the Nobel Peace Prize by the Finnish Socialist Karl H. Wiik on the grounds that "Debs started to work actively for peace during World War I, mainly because he considered the war to be in the interest of capitalism." The same year, he was named "national chairman" of the Socialist Party, a newly created office that allowed him to step away from the taxing work of the National Executive Committee.

He spent his remaining years trying to recover his health, which was severely undermined by prison confinement. In late 1926, he was admitted to Lindlahr Sanitarium in Elmhurst, Illinois. During his final days, Debs drifted in and out of a comatose state. His final words were written on a piece of paper, shortly before his death, and consisted of the final lines of William Ernest Henley's "Invictus":

It matters not how strait the gate,

How charged with punishments the scroll,

I am the master of my fate

I am the captain of my soul.

He died there of heart failure on October 20, 1926, at the age of 70. His body was cremated and buried in Highland Lawn Cemetery in Terre Haute, Indiana.

== Legacy ==
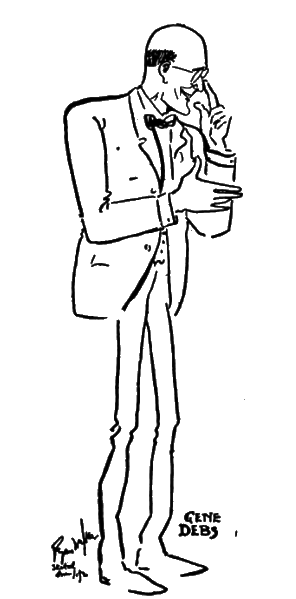
A cartoon of Debs drawn by Ryan Walker. Walker was one of Debs' friends and Debs considered this his favorite cartoon.

Debs helped motivate the American left to organize political opposition to corporations and World War I. American socialists, communists, and anarchists honor his work for the labor movement and motivation to have the average working man build socialism without large state involvement. Several books have been written about his life as an inspirational American socialist.

The Vermont senator and presidential candidate Bernie Sanders has long been an admirer of Debs and produced in 1979 a documentary about Debs which was released as a film and an audio LP record as an audiovisual teaching aid. In the documentary, he described Debs as "probably the most effective and popular leader that the American working class has ever had". Sanders hung a portrait of Debs in city hall in Burlington, Vermont, when he served as mayor of the city in the 1980s and has a plaque dedicated to Debs in his congressional office. On October 25, 2025, the Eugene V. Debs Foundation gave Senator Sanders the namesake award that was first recognized on John L. Lewis in 1965.

On May 22, 1962, Debs's home was purchased for $9,500 by the Eugene V. Debs Foundation, which worked to preserve it as a Debs memorial. In 1965 it was designated as an official historic site of the state of Indiana, and in 1966 it was designated as a National Historic Landmark of the United States. The preservation of the museum is monitored by the National Park Service. In 1990, the Department of Labor named Debs a member of its Labor Hall of Fame.

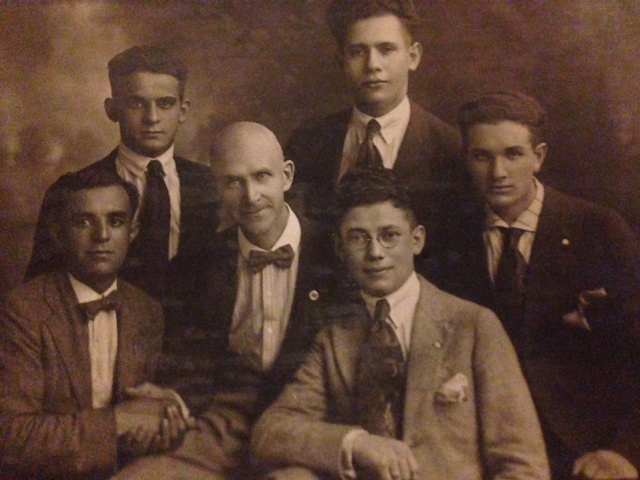
Debs sitting with five young socialists in Chicago c. 1910s. The man on the far right, Louis Eisner, is the father of Stanford University professor Elliot Eisner.

While Debs did not leave a collection of papers to a university library, the pamphlet collection which he and his brother amassed is held by Indiana State University in Terre Haute. The scholar Bernard Brommel, author of a 1978 biography of Debs, has donated his biographical research materials to the Newberry Library in Chicago, where they are open to researchers. The original manuscript of Debs's book Walls and Bars, with handwritten amendments, presumably by Debs, is held in the Thomas J. Morgan Papers in the special collections department of the University of Chicago Library.

Debs was so synonymous with the American socialist movement that other socialist politicians like Frank Crosswaith and Abraham Shiplacoff became known as the "Negro Debs" and the "Jewish Debs," respectively.

Eugene Township in Lake of the Woods County, Minnesota, was likely named after Debs. The community of Debs in Minnesota's Beltrami County may have also been named after him.

Eugene V. Debs Hall in Buffalo, NY is a 501(c)7 nonprofit social club; and home to the Eugene V. Debs Local Initiative, a project to document and commemorate Buffalo's labor movement history.

Former New York radio station WEVD (now ESPN radio), then owned by the socialist Yiddish newspaper The Jewish Daily Forward, took its call letters from his initials and was known as the "Debs Memorial Station."

Debs Place, a housing block in Co-op City in the Bronx, New York, was named in his honor. The Eugene V. Debs Cooperative House in Ann Arbor, Michigan, was named after Debs.

Debs School, a one-room schoolhouse built in 1926 in Hinsdale County, Colorado, was named in honor of Debs; the building also served as a community gathering spot for the rural area. Noteworthy for its unique ornamental concrete block construction, it was added to the National Register of Historic Places in 2005.

There are at least two beers named after Debs, namely Debs's Red Ale and Eugene.

The Oregon State Senator Eugene "Debbs" Potts was named in Debs's honor.

A documentary about Debs, The Revolutionist: Eugene V. Debs, was released on PBS TV series American Masters in 2019.

In 2025, democratic socialist New York City mayor-elect Zohran Mamdani in his victory speech quoted Debs's appeal to the Supreme Court, saying "I can see the dawn of a better day for humanity."

== Representation in other media ==
- John Dos Passos included Debs as a historical figure in his U.S.A. Trilogy. Debs is featured among other figures in the 42nd Parallel (1930).
- Fifty Years Before Your Eyes (1950) is a documentary including historic footage of Debs, among others, directed by Robert Youngson.
- The narrator of Hocus Pocus by Kurt Vonnegut is named Eugene Debs Hartke in honor of Debs (p. 1). A minor character in Vonnegut's Deadeye Dick is also explicitly named in honor of Debs.
- Debs appears in the Southern Victory Series novels The Great War: Breakthroughs and American Empire: Blood and Iron by Harry Turtledove.
- Democratic socialist Bernie Sanders voices Debs in a 1979 documentary about his political career.
- The alternate history collection Back in the USSA by Kim Newman and Eugene Byrne is set in a world where Debs leads a communist revolution in the United States in 1917.
- In the third episode of The Plot Against America HBO miniseries, fictional characters Herman Levin and Shepsie Tirchwell discuss if they voted for Debs or Franklin D. Roosevelt in past elections for President of the United States.

== Works ==
- Locomotive Firemen's Magazine (editor, 1880–1894). Vol. 4 (1880) | Vol. 5 (1881) | Vol. 6 (1882) | Vol. 7 (1883) | Vol. 8 (1884) | Vol. 9 (1885) | Vol. 10 (1886) | Vol. 11 (1887) | Vol. 12 (1888) | Vol. 13 (1889) | Vol. 14 (1890) | Vol. 15 (1891) | Vol. 16 (1892) | Vol. 17 (1893) | Vol. 18 (1894) .
- Debs: His Life, Writings, and Speeches: With a Department of Appreciations (1908). Girard, Kansas: Appeal to Reason.
- Labor and Freedom (1916). St. Louis: Phil Wagner. Audio version.
- Letters of Eugene V. Debs. J. Robert Constantine (ed.). In Three Volumes. Urbana: University of Illinois Press, 1990. —Abridged single volume version published as Gentle Rebel: Letters of Eugene V. Debs. (1995).
- Selected Works of Eugene V. Debs. Tim Davenport and David Walters (eds.).
  - Volume 1, Building Solidarity on the Tracks, 1877–1892. Chicago: Haymarket Books, 2019.
  - Volume 2, The Rise and Fall of the American Railway Union, 1892–1896. Chicago: Haymarket Books, 2020.
  - Volume 3, The Path to a Socialist Party, 1897–1904. Chicago: Haymarket Books, 2021.
  - Volume 4, Red Union, Red Paper, Red Train, 1905–1910. Chicago: Haymarket Books, 2025.
- "Susan B. Anthony: Pioneer of Freedom" (July 1917). Pearson's Magazine. 38: 1. pp. 5–7.
- Walls and Bars: Prisons and Prison Life In The "Land Of The Free" (1927). Chicago: Socialist Party of America.

== See also ==
- List of civil rights leaders
- List of people pardoned or granted clemency by the president of the United States
- Perennial candidates in the United States

== Bibliography ==
- Bell, Daniel (1967). Marxian Socialism in the United States. Princeton, New Jersey: Princeton University Press. ISBN 978-0-691-02155-3.
- Benjamin, Louise M. (2001). Freedom of the Air and the Public Interest: First Amendment Rights in Broadcasting to 1935. Carbondale: Southern Illinois University Press. ISBN 978-0-8093-2367-8.
- Carlson, Peter (1983). Roughneck: The Life and Times of Big Bill Haywood. New York: W.W. Norton.
- Chace, James (2004). 1912: Wilson, Roosevelt, Taft & Debs – the Election That Changed the Country. New York: Simon & Schuster. ISBN 978-0-7432-0394-4.
- Coben, Stanley (1963). A. Mitchell Palmer: Politician. New York: Columbia University Press. LCCN 63009874.
- Constantine, J. Robert; Malmgreen, Gail, eds. (1983). The Papers of Eugene V. Debs, 1834–1945: A Guide to the Microfilm Edition (PDF). Glen Rock, New Jersey: Microfilming Corporation of America. ISBN 978-0-667-00699-7. Archived (PDF) from the original on July 15, 2021.
- Davenport, Tim; Walters, David (2019). Introduction. The Selected Works of Eugene V. Debs. Volume I: Building Solidarity on the Tracks, 1877–1892. By Debs, Eugene V. Davenport, Tim; Walters, David (eds.). Chicago: Haymarket Books. ISBN 978-1-60846-973-4.
- Dean, John W. (2004). Warren G. Harding. New York: Times Books. ISBN 978-0-8050-6956-3.
- Farrell, John A. (2011). Clarence Darrow: Attorney for the Damned. New York: Knopf Doubleday. ISBN 978-0-385-53451-2.
- Friedberg, Gerald (Spring 1965). "Sources for the Study of Socialism in America, 1901–1919". Labor History. 6 (2): 159–165. doi:10.1080/00236566508583964. ISSN 1469-9702.
- Ginger, Ray (1949). The Bending Cross: A Biography of Eugene Victor Debs. New Brunswick, New Jersey: Rutgers University Press. OCLC 1028726461. (1992 Thomas Jefferson University Press edition ISBN 978-0-618-34085-9.)
- Haywood, William D. (1966) [1929]. Bill Haywood's Book: The Autobiography of William D. Haywood. New York: International Publishers. OCLC 1147712781.
- Heath, Frederic (1900). Socialism in America [also known as Social Democracy Red Book]. Terre Haute, Indiana: Debs Publishing Co.
- Kennedy, David M.; Cohen, Lizabeth; Bailey, Thomas A. (2006). The American Pageant. Houghton Mifflin. ISBN 978-0-618-47940-5. OCLC 67933936.
- Kipnis, Ira (1952). The American Socialist Movement, 1897–1912. New York: Columbia University Press.
- Lindsey, Almont (1964). The Pullman Strike: The Story of a Unique Experiment and of a Great Labor Upheaval. Chicago: University of Chicago Press. OCLC 257029.
- Noggle, Burl (1974). Into the Twenties: The United States from Armistice to Normalcy. Urbana: University of Illinois Press. ISBN 978-0-252-00420-9.
- Pietrusza, David (2007). 1920: The Year of Six Presidents. New York: Carroll and Graf.
- Reitano, Joanne (2003). "Railroad Strike of 1888". In Schlup, Leonard C.; Ryan, James G. (eds.). Historical Dictionary of the Gilded Age. Armonk, New York: M. E. Sharpe. p. 405. ISBN 978-0-7656-2106-1. Archived from the original on August 21, 2020.
- Salvatore, Nick (1982). Eugene V. Debs: Citizen and Socialist. Urbana: University of Illinois Press. ISBN 978-0-252-00967-9.
- Sanders, Bernie (1979). Eugene V. Debs: Trade Unionist, Socialist, Revolutionary, 1855–1926 (audio recording). New York: Folkways Records. Archived from the original on December 11, 2021 – via YouTube.
- Shannon, David A. (1951). "Eugene V. Debs: Conservative Labor Editor". Indiana Magazine of History. 47 (4): 357–364. JSTOR 27787982.
- Upham, Warren (2001). Minnesota Place Names: A Geographical Encyclopedia (3rd ed.). Saint Paul: Minnesota Historical Society Press. ISBN 978-0-87351-396-8.

Party political offices
| New political party | Socialist nominee for President of the United States; 1900, 1904, 1908, 1912 | Succeeded by Allan L. Benson |
| Preceded by Allan L. Benson | Socialist nominee for President of the United States; 1920 | Succeeded by Robert M. La Follette; Endorsed |
