= Terre Haute Lodge No. 19, F&AM =

Terre Haute Lodge No. 19, F&AM (Chartered September 13, 1821) is a lodge of Freemasons in Terre Haute, Indiana. It is the oldest existing organization in the city and in Vigo County, with the exception of Vigo County Government.

== History ==
On March 10, 1819, thirteen Freemasons residing in the village of Terre Haute petitioned the recently formed Grand Lodge of Indiana for dispensation to establish a lodge, which was received on July 12, 1819. The officers were installed by Elihu Stout of Vincennes Lodge No. 1, with Peter B. Allen as its first Master, and the Lodge began its labors. It continued working under this dispensation, until a charter was issued by Grand Lodge on September 13, 1821.

The Lodge predates the incorporation of Terre Haute as a town (1832) and as a city (1853). The oldest existing church did not organize until 1828, the first newspaper was not printed until 1823, and the oldest bank was not chartered until 1834.

Terre Haute Lodge No. 19 worked with several other Masonic bodies to create the Terre Haute Masonic Temple Association in 1911. This body erected the Terre Haute Masonic Temple in 1917, which has been the Lodge's permanent home since.

In 1912, Lodge No. 19 participated in the centennial celebrations of the Siege of Fort Harrison, it being the only surviving organization which existed when there was a Fort Harrison.

In 1919, the Lodge observed the 100th anniversary of its first meeting with a county-wide celebration.

At its peak in the early 1950s, Terre Haute Lodge No. 19's membership totaled over 1,600.

== Notable members ==
Over its nearly 200-year history, Terre Haute Lodge No. 19 has had a number of notable members, including

- Peter Buell Allen (Nov. 12, 1775 – June 13, 1833) - Born in the northern portion of the New York Colony, Allen grew up during the American Revolution and served as a Colonel during the War of 1812. He was appointed a Brevet Brigadier General in the New York State Militia in 1815. Politically, he served as a New York State Assemblyman in 1816 and as an Indiana State Representative in 1819. He was also recorded as the General Contractor for the first Vigo County Courthouse.
- Samuel McQuilkin (June 5, 1775 – Mar. 3, 1849) - McQuilkin served in the Ohio Militia during the War of 1812 and moved to Indiana by 1818. He acquired a tavern license in May 1819 and established his “Light Horse Tavern” soon after. He operated his tavern and other business ventures in Terre Haute proper before turning his attentions to the west side of the Wabash River. After purchasing a considerable about of property in Sugar Creek Township, he laid out McQuilkinsville on November 22, 1836. McQuilkinsville eventually became Macksville (or Maxville) and officially became West Terre Haute in 1894.
- Demas Deming, Sr. (Mar. 22, 1787 – Mar. 3, 1865) - Deming was born in Connecticut. During the War of 1812, he entered service in the U.S. Army with the rank of 2nd Lieutenant. He arrived in Terre Haute in 1818. Deming served in the Indiana House of Representatives in 1828–29; as one of the first judges in Vigo Co.; and as the first president of the Second State Bank of Indiana at Terre Haute in 1834 (now First Financial Bank and Indiana's oldest national bank). With Chauncey Warren, he established the Terre Haute Brewing Company in 1837. In 1921, a portion of his estate was sold to the City of Terre Haute and became the public park that bears his family name.
- Elijah Tillotson (Sep. 22, 1791 – Mar. 31, 1857) - Originally from New York, Tillotson was an accomplished silversmith, jeweler, and watchmaker and was the first to ply this trade in Terre Haute when he arrived in 1824. Politically, he was elected as the first Mayor of Terre Haute (before incorporation) in 1838 and served for some time as an Associate Judge. Tillotson was one of the saviors of Terre Haute Lodge No. 19; during the anti-Masonic period from 1834 to 1845, the charter, jewels, and furniture of the Lodge were preserved in the safe at his jewelry store.
- Amory Kinney (Apr. 13, 1792 – Nov. 20, 1859) – Born in Vermont, Kinney studied law in New York before moving west and settling in Indiana. He was an ardent abolitionist and was responsible, with John Osborn, for the Indiana Supreme Court case of Polly v. Lasselle, which resulted in all slaves held within Indiana being freed. Politically, he served as a Justice of the Peace in 1827; he served in the Indiana House of Representatives 1830-31 and 1847–48, the Terre Haute Town Council in 1838–39, and as judge of the Common Pleas court from 1852 to 1856.
- Thomas H. Blake (June 14, 1792 – Nov. 28, 1849) – A Maryland native, Thomas Blake served in the D.C. Militia during the War of 1812. Blake was one of the earliest lawyers to reside in Terre Haute and served as U.S. Attorney for the District of Indiana in 1817–18. He was commissioned by Gov. Jonathan Jennings as the first President Judge of the first court in Vigo Co. in 1818. Blake served in the Indiana House in 1818–19, 1822–25, and 1829–30 and as a State Senator in 1820–21. In 1827 he was elected to the U.S. House of Representatives from Indiana's First District. He was appointed as the Commissioner of the General Land Trust Office by President John Tyler in 1842. Thomas Blake famously dueled with Alexander Buckner in July, 1818; Buckner was then the first Grand Master of the Grand Lodge of Indiana.
- Lucius H. Scott (Mar. 29, 1794 – Apr. 22, 1875) - A native of Pennsylvania, Scott arrived in Terre Haute in 1817. He began his career on the frontier as one of the first schoolteachers in the area and an early merchant. Politically, he was the first elected sheriff of Vigo County in 1818, and was elected to the Indiana House of Representatives in 1822. In 1847, he and his family returned to Pennsylvania where he served as Grand Master in 1865–1866.
- James S. Freeman (1800–1855) - Freeman had acquired property in Greene County before 1840, and was elected to the Indiana House of Representatives, serving from 1840 to 1841. He relocated to Terre Haute by early 1842 and for several years ran a produce and provisions store along the National Road. He served as a local Justice of the Peace for a few years and was instrumental in the revival of the Lodge after the anti-Masonic movement. He also served a few years as a Grand Warden in the Grand Lodge before his death.
- Albert Lange (Dec. 16, 1801 – July 25, 1869) – Born in Germany, Lange was convicted of treason against the German Empire in 1824 for advocating a constitutional government. He was pardoned in 1829 and immigrated to the United States. Politically, he was appointed by President Zachary Taylor as U.S. Consul to the Port of Amsterdam from 1849 to 1850; he served as Vigo County Auditor from 1851 to 1859 and Indiana State Auditor from 1861 to 1863; and he served as Mayor of Terre Haute from 1863 to 1867.
- Thomas Dowling Dec. 21, 1806 – Dec. 6, 1876) – Born in Ireland, Dowling arrived in the U.S. in 1814 and moved to Terre Haute in 1832. He established The Wabash Courier newspaper the year he arrived and The Wabash Express some years later. In 1849 he assumed the position of resident Trustee of the Wabash & Erie Canal. Politically, Dowling was elected to the Indiana House of Representatives 1836–38, 1840–41, 1843–44, 1845–46, and 1848–49. He served as a Vigo County Commissioner in 1873 and was a member of the Terre Haute City Council at the time of his death.
- Richard W. Thompson (June 9, 1809 – Feb. 9, 1900) – A Virginia native, Thompson was admitted to the Indiana Bar in 1834. Politically, he served in the Indiana House of Representatives from 1834 to 1836, as a State Senator from 1837 to 1838 (where he was chosen President Pro Tem and was briefly acting Lieutenant Governor), and as a U.S. Representative from Indiana in 1841-43 and 1847–49. During the Civil War, he received a commission as a Colonel and was commander of Camp Vigo in Terre Haute. In 1864, President Abraham Lincoln appointed him as Collector of Internal Revenue for the Seventh Indiana District, and from 1867 to 1869 he was the judge of the fifth circuit court. He was the 27th U.S. Secretary of the Navy from 1877 to 1880 under President Rutherford B. Hayes.
- William K. Edwards (Dec. 26, 1820 – Sep. 26, 1878) – Edwards was born in Kentucky and moved to Terre Haute in 1843 to practice law. Politically, he was first elected to the General Assembly in 1845, serving 3 terms, and was selected as Speaker of the Indiana House of Representatives in 1872–77. He was elected as the First Mayor of Terre Haute (after incorporation) serving from 1853 to 1855. He was secretary of the first board of managers for the Terre Haute School of Industrial Sciences (later Rose Polytechnic Institute/Rose-Hulman Institute of Technology) and was a trustee of Indiana University from 1855 to 1859 and 1861-78 (serving as president of the board 1855–57). He took a demit from Old Nineteen in 1849 to become a charter member of Social Lodge No. 86. Edwards also served as Grand Master of the Independent Order of Odd Fellows Grand Lodge of Indiana in 1853.
- Charles Cruft (Jan. 12, 1826 – Mar. 23, 1883) – Born in Terre Haute, Cruft graduated from Wabash College at the age of 17. Before being admitted to the Indiana Bar in 1848, he worked as an educator and bookkeeper. When the Civil War began in 1861, he received a commission as Colonel and mustered the 31st Indiana Volunteer Infantry. Engaging in multiple battles – including Fort Donelson, Shiloh, Stones River, and Chickamauga – he was brevetted to the rank of Major General by Abraham Lincoln in March 1865. He returned home to practice law and run The Terre Haute Express newspaper and served on the original board of managers for the Terre Haute School of Industrial Sciences (later Rose Polytechnic Institute/Rose-Hulman Institute of Technology).
- Thomas B. Long (Oct. 25, 1836 – July 2, 1900) - Born in Ohio, Long arrived in Terre Haute as a youth and began studying law under Richard Thompson in 1854. After receiving a law degree from Cincinnati College in 1856, he returned to Terre Haute and set up his own practice. He was prosecuting attorney of the Vigo Common Pleas Court from 1857 to 1858 and served as school superintendent 1868–69. In 1870 he was elected judge of the Vigo Criminal Circuit Court, and served twelve years, ending in 1882. He was an accomplished poet and lyricist, with many of his works published between 1860 and his death. Long served in many state and national Masonic offices and served as Grand Master of Indiana, 1889–1890.
- George E. Farrington (Sep. 24, 1841 – Feb. 7, 1920) - A Terre Haute native, Farrington was attending Kenyon College when the Civil War broke out. While serving with the 85th Indiana Infantry near Fort Granger, Tennessee, Farrington and Col. Louis Watkins captured the Confederate spies Orton Williams and Walter Peters. Farrington was honorably discharged in 1865 as a First Lieutenant. He returned to Terre Haute where he ran a wholesale grocery business before taking a position with the Terre Haute & Indianapolis Railroad in 1869. There, he rose through the ranks until becoming general agent and corporate secretary; he was also secretary-treasurer of the Vandalia Line. Farrington was a member of the original board of managers of the Rose Orphans Home and served as its secretary for 30 years. A portion of his family's farm is now part of the Farrington Grove Historic District, and the local chapter of the Order of Demolay was originally named in his memory.
- William H. Wiley (Dec. 28, 1842 – Mar. 24, 1927) - Wiley was born in Rush County, Indiana, and was educated in the Marion County schools and North-Western Christian University (now Butler University) where he received a master's degree. He moved to Terre Haute where he served as principal of the city high school before being named Terre Haute Public School Superintendent in 1869 (a position he held for the next 37 years). Wiley also served as president of the Indiana State Teachers Association (in 1876), the Southern Indiana Teachers Association, and of The Educator-Journal Company. Upon his retirement in 1906, the city high school was renamed Wiley High School in his honor.
- Michael Sheldon Swope (Nov. 3, 1843 – July 9, 1929) - Born in Attica, Indiana, Swope first came to Terre Haute to enlist in the 14th Indiana Regiment during the Civil War. He returned in 1867 and began his career in the jewelry business. By the late 19th Century, his store was one of Indiana's largest. Under the terms of his will, an endowment of funds for the establishment of an art gallery was invested for 10 years. With these funds, the Sheldon Swope Art Museum opened to the public in 1942 and now houses over 2,500 works of American art.
- Robert Van Valzah (Apr. 9, 1843 – Oct. 23, 1892) – A native of Pennsylvania, Van Valzah served in the Union Army during the Civil War. By trade he was a dentist, organizing and serving as the first vice president of the Indiana Dental Association. Politically, he served on the Terre Haute City Council for one term beginning in 1868 and he was elected to the Indiana House of Representatives in 1878. Van Valzah served in many state and national Masonic offices and served as Grand Master of Indiana, 1878–1879.
- Elisha Havens (May 12, 1846 – Dec. 23, 1922) & Robert G. Geddes (Dec. 24, 1844 – Jan. 20, 1922) - Havens was born in Columbus, Ohio, and moved to Terre Haute in 1862. Geddes, from Casey, Illinois, arrived in Terre Haute before 1870. Both men were employed by the dry goods firm of Jeffers & Miller and formed a partnership to buy the business in 1871. Together, they expanded the company and built the Havens & Geddes Department Store at the corner of Fifth and Wabash in 1893 – the largest dry goods store in Indiana at the time. On Dec. 19, 1898, a notorious fire destroyed the department store and most of the city block. After the fire, Havens & Geddes relocated to Indianapolis.
- Frank P. Sargent (Nov.18, 1851 – Sep. 4, 1908) - Originally from Vermont, Sargent moved around the United States for several years, even serving as a sergeant in the U.S. Cavalry during the Apache Wars in Arizona. He began his railroad career in 1880, and was elevated to the office of Grand Master, Brotherhood of Locomotive Firemen and Enginemen in 1885 and settled in Terre Haute at that time. He served in that capacity until 1902, when he was appointed as Commissioner General of Immigration by President Theodore Roosevelt, serving in this office until his death.
- Benjamin G. Hudnut (Jan. 19, 1854 – Nov. 15, 1935) - Born in Edinburgh, Indiana, Hudnut moved to Terre Haute in 1866 when his father established a hominy mill at Swan and Water Streets. He entered the family business and, with his father, developed and patented corn processing equipment and edible cereal products. In 1898, Hudnut patented the first machines and process for extracting food quality oil from corn; he sold Mazoil to the public the following year. He was engaged in numerous other ventures as an owner, president, or director, including the Citizen's Street Railway in Vincennes, the Vigo Co. National Bank, and the Indiana Savings, Loan, and Building Association. The small village of Hudnut, near Lyford in Parke County was named after the Hudnut Co. mill located there.
- Frank McKeen (May 26, 1853 – May 20, 1916) - McKeen was born on the second floor of the Second State Bank in Terre Haute. He worked his way up through his father's bank, the McKeen State/National Bank, eventually taking over from his father as president in 1913. He was a director of the Terre Haute Business Men's Association and was an organizer of both the Terre Haute Telephone Exchange Co. and Citizen's Gas & Fuel Co. He was also president of the Terre Haute Water Works Co.
- Eugene V. Debs Nov. 5, 1855 – Oct. 20, 1926) – Terre Haute's most famous native son began working on the railroad by 1870 and joined the Brotherhood of Locomotive Firemen in 1875. He was appointed Grand Secretary/Treasurer of the BLF in 1880 and continued in this capacity until 1893 when he organized the American Railway Union and was elected its first President. He was arrested in 1894 for violating an injunction issued during the Pullman Strike. While in prison, Debs began his association with socialism. Upon his release, he established the Industrial Workers of the World in 1905. Politically, he was elected as a Democratic member of the Indiana House of Representatives for one term in 1885–86. He ran for the office of President of the United States as the Socialist Party of America candidate five times (in 1900, 1904, 1908, 1912, and 1920). In 1918, he was convicted and imprisoned for sedition for speaking out against the US involvement in World War I. His sentence was commuted by President Warren G. Harding in 1921. For his efforts to promote peace during the war, he was nominated for the Nobel Peace Prize in 1924. (Entered Apprentice and Fellow Craft degrees, only)
- Jacob Drennan Early (Nov. 4, 1859 – Oct. 20, 1919) - Born in Terre Haute, Early was educated at Kenyon College and the University of Virginia School of Law. He returned to Terre Haute where he was admitted to the bar in 1883. Politically, he served as a State Senator from 1896 to 1900 where he authored 2 amendments to the Indiana State Constitution. He was a delegate to the Republican National Convention in 1888, which nominated Benjamin Harrison for the Presidency.
- Chapman J. Root (Nov. 22, 1864 – Nov. 20, 1945) – A native of Pennsylvania, Root moved to Terre Haute in 1900 and established The Root Glass Company the following year. The company began manufacturing bottles for the Coca-Cola Company in 1904. In 1913, Root and a team of 5 others designed the now famous “contour” Coca-Cola bottle, which was patented on November 16, 1915.
- William R. McKeen, Jr. (Oct. 2, 1869 – Oct. 19, 1946) – McKeen was born in Terre Haute and educated at Rose Polytechnic Institute, Johns Hopkins University, and Berlin University. He began his career working for the Terre Haute & Indianapolis railroad (owned by his father) before leaving for Union Pacific in 1898. Eventually moving to Omaha, he founded the McKeen Motor Car Company where he developed the track motor car and McKeen Railmotor. He sold his interest in the McKeen Motor Car Co. to Union Pacific in 1920 and retired to Santa Barbara, California. At the time of his death, he had registered and held over 2000 patents.
- John R. Hunter (Jul. 5, 1885 – Mar. 15, 1960) - Hunter was born in Algonquin, Illinois, and moved to Terre Haute in 1918 where he further developed his career in insurance. He served for a time on the local school board and was active in the Wabash Valley Council for Boy Scouts, serving as a scout master and council officer. Hunter was most well known for his participation in the Masonic fraternity, serving in many capacities including as Secretary of Terre Haute Lodge No. 19 from 1928 to 1960 and ultimately as Grand Master of Indiana in 1939–1940.
- Art Nehf (Jul. 31, 1892 – Dec. 18, 1960) – Born in Terre Haute, Nehf attended Rose Polytechnic Institute. He was a left-handed pitcher and made his professional baseball debut with the Boston Braves (baseball) (1915–1919). He later played for the New York Giants (baseball team) (1919–1926), the Cincinnati Reds (1926–1927), and the Chicago Cubs (1927–1929).
- Birch Evans Bayh, Sr. (Sep. 29, 1893 – Aug. 26, 1971) – Born in Quincey, Indiana, Bayh attended school in Clay City. He graduated from Indiana State Normal College in 1917 and was hired as head basketball and baseball coach, athletic director, and professor of physical education in 1918. He was a long-time high school basketball official in Indiana and officiated ten state championship games, a record that he still holds. Bayh is perhaps best known as the father of U.S. Senator Birch Evans Bayh, Jr., and grandfather of U.S. Senator and Indiana Governor Birch Evans (Evan) Bayh, III.
- Howard L. Sharpe (Jan. 5, 1916 – Apr. 3, 2005) - “Sharpie” was born in Vincennes and spent a few childhood years in Terre Haute before moving to Gary, Indiana, with his family. In 1936, he returned to Terre Haute to enroll at Indiana State Teacher's College where he was a three-year letterman in basketball and baseball. Upon graduation, he embarked upon a 47-year coaching career, 40 years of which were spent in Vigo County (notably at Gerstmeyer and Terre Haute North Vigo). In 1971, he was inducted into the Indiana Basketball Hall of Fame. He was named National High School Basketball Coach of the Year in 1975. From 1987 to 1999, he was the all-time win record holder for an Indiana basketball coach, and is currently the second.
- Luken E. Dever (June 8, 1918 – July 31, 2014) - Dever was born in Terre Haute. He began his career with Paitson Brothers Hardware and Montgomery Ward before rising through the ranks of Meis Department Store where he became a vice president. In 1974, he became associated with the wholesale beer business and soon established Dever Distributing Company. Dever was active in many community programs including Terre Haute Urban Forest Council. He was a founding member of TREES, Inc. and served as a board member of the Terre Haute Action Track.
- Chapman Shaw Root (May 8, 1925 – July 2, 1990) - A Terre Haute Native, Root inherited his grandfather's Coca-Cola bottling business in 1946. By 1951, he had relocated the headquarters to Daytona Beach, Florida, and soon developed the enterprise into one of the largest independent bottling companies – the Associated Coca-Cola Bottlers. Root sold his bottling firm directly to Coca-Cola in 1982. During his life, Root made sizeable financial contributions to many groups and foundations, including substantial gifts to Indiana State University and Rose-Hulman Institute of Technology.

== Past Masters ==
The following is a list of the Past Masters, or past presiding officers, of Terre Haute Lodge No. 19.

Peter Buell Allen * — 1819

Peter Buell Allen * — 1820

Peter Buell Allen * — 1821

Demas Deming, Sr. * — 1821

Samuel McQuilkin * — 1821

Lucius H. Scott* (Past Grand Master of Pennsylvania 1865 - 1866) — 1822

Samuel McQuilkin * — 1822

Samuel McQuilkin * — 1823

Peter Buell Allen * — 1823

Samuel McQuilkin * — 1824

Peter Buell Allen * — 1825

Thomas H. Clark * — 1825

Elijah Tillotson, Jr. * — 1826

John F. Cruft * — 1827

Elijah Tillotson, Jr. * — 1827

Elijah Tillotson, Jr. * — 1828

Henry Allen * — 1828

Elijah Tillotson, Jr. * — 1829

Elijah Tillotson, Jr. * — 1830

Henry Allen * — 1831

Henry Allen * — 1832

Elijah Tillotson, Jr. * — 1833

Ransom Miller * — 1834

Ransom Miller * — 1835

Ransom Miller * — 1836

Ransom Miller * — 1837

Ransom Miller * — 1838

Ransom Miller * — 1839

Ransom Miller * — 1840

Ransom Miller * — 1841

Ransom Miller * — 1842

Ransom Miller * — 1843

Ransom Miller * — 1844

Ransom Miller * — 1845

James S. Freeman * — 1846

James S. Freeman * — 1847

Dayton Topping * — 1847

Dayton Topping * — 1848

Albert Lange * — 1848

James S. Freeman * — 1849

Albert Lange * — 1849

Robert Wharry * — 1850

George F. Lyon* — 1850

George F. Lyon* — 1851

Arba Holmes * — 1852

Robert Wharry * — 1853

Thomas I. Bourne* — 1854

James S. Wyeth* — 1855

James S. Wyeth* — 1856

Arba Holmes * — 1857

James S. Wyeth* — 1858

Richard W. Thompson * — 1859

James D. Wright * — 1860

Arba Holmes * — 1861

Lyndon H. Smith * — 1862

Lyndon H. Smith * — 1863

Lyndon H. Smith * — 1864

Lyndon H. Smith * — 1865

Lyndon H. Smith * — 1866

Lyndon H. Smith * — 1867

Lyndon H. Smith * — 1868

Robert Van Valzah * (Past Grand Master 1878 – 1879) — 1869

Robert Van Valzah * (Past Grand Master 1878 – 1879) — 1870

Edward L. Norcross * — 1871,

Edward L. Norcross * — 1872

Robert Van Valzah * (Past Grand Master 1878 – 1879) — 1873

Robert Van Valzah * (Past Grand Master 1878 – 1879) — 1874

Robert Van Valzah * (Past Grand Master 1878 – 1879) — 1875

Robert Van Valzah * (Past Grand Master 1878 – 1879) — 1876

Alexander Thomas * — 1877

Robert Van Valzah * (Past Grand Master 1878 – 1879) — 1878

Henry M. Ballew * — 1879

Henry M. Ballew * — 1880

Thomas B. Long * (Past Grand Master 1889 – 1890) — 1881

Thomas B. Long * (Past Grand Master 1889 – 1890) — 1882

Thomas B. Long * (Past Grand Master 1889 – 1890) — 1883

Thomas B. Long * (Past Grand Master 1889 – 1890) — 1884

Thomas B. Long * (Past Grand Master 1889 – 1890) — 1885

Frank C. Danaldson * — 1886

Frank C. Danaldson * — 1887

Harry P. Creager * — 1888

John W. Cruft * — 1889

Jacob D. Earley * — 1890

George E. Pugh * — 1891

William C. Durham * — 1892

William Penn * — 1893,

George A. Gagg * — 1894

George C. Buntin * — 1895

Louis Craig * — 1896

Robert W. Van Valzah * — 1897

Hal H. Dronberger * — 1898

William Penn * — 1899

Samuel L. Fenner * — 1900

David Lesseig, Jr. * — 1901

William H. Jackson * — 1902

William S. Roney * — 1903

Fred J. Longman * — 1904

Horace E. Tune * — 1905

John Cline * — 1906

William B. Hice * — 1907

Luther Z. Breaks * — 1908

Elam S. Williams * — 1909

Walter C. Clark * — 1910

Harold A. Elton * — 1911

John Stuart Jordan * — 1912

Truman B. English * — 1913

Otto A. Cottom * — 1914

Thomas J. Sanders * — 1915

Walter B. Noffsinger * — 1916

Clyde Paris * — 1917

Charles E. Scott * — 1918

Hugh E. Garrott * — 1919

George W. Kruzan * — 1920

Zory J. King * — 1921

Herschell G. Harrah * — 1922

Charles W. West * — 1923

Charles W. Cornutt * — 1924

Guy W. Rustanmier * — 1925

John R. Hunter * (Past Grand Master 1939 – 1940) — 1926

Daniel E. Miller * — 1927

Richard P. Gillum * — 1928

Charles R. Roberts * — 1929

Hugh M. Leith * — 1930

Morris L. Cleverley * — 1931

Rector R. Capps — 1932

Chester C. Smith * — 1933

Russell A. Myers * — 1934

Jesse D. Hicks * — 1935

Dolph C. Cross — 1936

John D. Royer * — 1937

William G. Adams * — 1938

Alta L. Richards * — 1939

Willis S. Driskell * — 1940

Walter G. Rice * — 1941

Lester H. Spencer * — 1942

Roy W. Lafollette * — 1943

Gilbert L. Piker * — 1944

Jack C. Ballinger * — 1945

George W. Stewart * — 1946

Philip O. Roth * — 1947

Herman C. Canine * — 1948

Philip M. Baugh * — 1949

Ralph E. Elrod * — 1950

Wilbert C. Cottrell * — 1951

Clark M. Hayward, Jr. * — 1952

Clifford F. Wampler * — 1953

C. Ernest Molter * — 1954

Robert L. Vermillion * — 1955

Jack J. Hudson * — 1956

Marvin M. Foulke * — 1957

Charles M. Banks * — 1958

Basil E. Bennett * — 1959

A. Eugene Eskew * — 1960

Joseph G. Barton * — 1961

Charles W. Fort * — 1962

Jeff J. Miller * — 1963

Paul E. Hartzler * — 1964

James R. Riggle * — 1965

Nicholas M. Dupies * — 1966

Vernon B. Cristee * — 1967

Hugh E. Titus * — 1968

Paul W. Sudbrink * — 1969

Ralph T. Pence * — 1970

William P. Sheets * — 1971

Robert F. Miller * — 1972

Philip J. Baker, Jr. * — 1973

Charles L. Compton — 1974

Bruce D. Willis — 1975

Clarence H. Jones * — 1976

Paul W. Sudbrink * — 1977

Horace E. Pence * — 1978

Jesse W. Oliver * — 1979

Jesse W. Oliver * — 1980

J. Lynn Addison * — 1981

Merlin H. Whitehead * — 1982

James R. Riggle * — 1983

John L. Ross * — 1984

Jack A. Wright — 1985

Larry R. Snow * — 1986

Loren L. O'Neal * — 1987

Norman G. Hall * — 1988

Dennis R. Cummins * — 1989

Warren H. Brewer, Jr. * — 1990

Ralph T. Pence * — 1991

Hugh E. Titus * — 1992

Dennis R. Cummins * — 1993

Howard P. Higgins * — 1994

Myron E. Johnson — 1995

Greg A. Morris — 1996

William J. Chance — 1997

Charles L. Compton — 1998

William J. Chance — 1999

Gary W. O'Neal * — 2000

Howard P. Higgins * — 2001

Robert L. Shockley * — 2002

Robert L. Shockley * — 2003

David M. Peter — 2004,

David M. Peter — 2005

Bruce Drummond — 2006

Bruce H. Royer — 2007

S. Alex Ruthmann — 2008

David M. Peter — 2009

David M. Peter — 2010

David M. Peter — 2011

Justin E. Runyon — 2012

Matthew E. Lowe — 2013

Matthew E. Lowe — 2014

Jordan M. Bayles — 2015

Ian J. Bertucci — 2016

Matthew E. Lowe — 2017

Christopher N. Cordray — 2018

Ian J. Bertucci — 2019

Christopher L. Thompson — 2020

Ian J. Bertucci — 2021

- = Deceased
