= Harvey D. Scott =

American politician

Henry D. Scott

Member of the U.S. House of Representatives from Indiana's 7th district
- In office March 4, 1855 – March 3, 1857
- Preceded by: John G. Davis
- Succeeded by: John G. Davis

Personal details
- Born: Harvey David Scott; October 18, 1818 Ashtabula, Ohio, U.S.
- Died: July 11, 1891 (aged 72) Pasadena, California, U.S.
- Resting place: Mountain View Cemetery
- Party: Indiana People's Party
- Children: Fred Newton Scott

Harvey David Scott (October 18, 1818 – July 11, 1891) was an American lawyer and politician who served one term as a U.S. representative from Indiana from 1855 to 1857.

Scott was the father of rhetorician Fred Newton Scott.

== Biography ==
Born near Ashtabula, Ohio, Scott attended the public schools and the Asbury (now De Pauw) University at Greencastle, Indiana. He studied law. He was admitted to the bar and commenced practice in Terre Haute, Indiana. He held several local offices.

=== Congress ===
Scott was elected as an Indiana People's Party candidate to the Thirty-fourth Congress (March 4, 1855 – March 3, 1857).

=== Later career and death ===
He resumed the practice of law, serving as judge of the circuit court of Vigo County from 1881 to 1884.

He moved to California in 1887 and died in Pasadena on July 11, 1891. He was interred in Mountain View Cemetery.

=== Family ===
Scott was the father of rhetorician Fred Newton Scott.

== Notes ==
U.S. House of Representatives
Preceded by John G. Davis	Member of the U.S. House of Representatives from Indiana's 7th congressional district 1855–1857	Succeeded by John G. Davis
