= Peter Buell Allen =

American politician and military commander

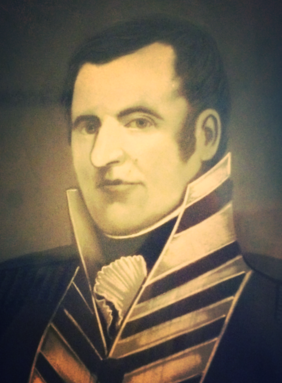
- Image of Peter Buell Allen, Lt. Col. War of 1812

New York State Assembly
- Preceded by: Abraham Dox (Dem. Rep.)
- Succeeded by: Henry Fellows (Federalist)

Indiana State Legislature
- In office 1819–1820
- Preceded by: George R. C. Sullivan; Robert Buntin
- Succeeded by: Robert Sturgis (Federalist); George R. C. Sullivan (Federalist); John MacDonald (Federalist)

Personal details
- Born: November 24, 1775 Dutchess County, Province of New York, British North America
- Died: June 13, 1833 (aged 57) Terre Haute, Indiana
- Party: Democratic Republican
- Spouse: Mary Peterson
- Children: Henry Allen (1797-1837); Ira Allen(1799-1866); Catherine Allen (1801-1821); Harriett Allen (1803-1845); Myron Holley Allen (1805-1866); Amanda Allen (1807-1866); Chloe Ward Allen (1809-1869); Peter Benton Allen (1811-1885); Adeline Allen (1814-1857)

Peter Buell Allen (November 24, 1775 – June 13, 1833) was a politician and military commander in New York State in the early 1800s and a pioneer of Vigo County and Terre Haute, Indiana.

Peter Buell Allen was born in Dutchess County, New York to Moses and Chloe (Ward) Allen and was the eldest of eight children, including his younger brother Nathaniel Allen. Peter and his wife, Mary moved from Duchess County to Ontario County, New York in 1797 and the US Census of 1800 recorded them as having two sons, Ira age 1 and Henry age 3. In 1812 Peter Allen served in the Ontario County Legislature before being commissioned in the New York State Militia as a Commanding Lieutenant Colonel in the 22nd Infantry Regiment. After the War of 1812 Allen became involved with St. Pauls Protestant Episcopal Church in Richmond, New York was elected to two terms in the New York State Assembly as a representative of Ontario County, before selling his New York and Connecticut land holdings to his brother Nathaniel Allen, in 1817, and moving west, eventually landing in Terre Haute, Indiana in 1818.

== Freemasonry ==
On December 24, 1802, Peter Allen is recorded as being one of nine Freemasons in Ontario County, New York (in what would become the Town of Richmond, New York) who signed a petition to the Grand Lodge of New York, Free & Accepted Masons, for permission to form Genesee Lodge, the petition was endorsed by Ontario Lodge No. 23 as the nearest lodge, in Canandaigua, New York. The Charter to work as Genesee Lodge No. 32 was issued on June 14, 1806.

After moving to Indiana, in 1819 Allen was one of thirteen Freemasons that petitioned the Grand Lodge of Indiana for permission to create a Masonic Lodge in Terre Haute on March 10, 1819. The other signers of the petition were John T. Chunn, Lucius H. Scott, Toussaint DuBois, James Hall, Andrew Brooks, Zebina C. Hovey, Demas Deming Sr., Curtis Gilbert, Samuel McQuilken, Robert Brasher, Thomas H. Clark, and Elihu Hovey. The dispensation was granted and the Lodge first met at Terre Haute Lodge Under Dispensation [U.D.] on July 12, 1819. Peter Buell Allen was appointed as the first presiding officer, or Worshipful Master, of the Lodge during dispensation and installed in this position on July 12, 1819. Allen continued to serve the additional 6-month terms with installation dates on September 11, 1820; December 29, 1820; and May 10, 1821.

While in session in Corydon, Indiana on September 13, 1821, the Grand Lodge of Indiana issued the charter for Terre Haute Lodge and it was issued the number 19 and was the 19th successive Lodge chartered by the Grand Lodge of Indiana. The charter was signed by Grand Master John Sheets, Deputy Grand Master Jonathan Jennings, Senior Grand Warden Thomas Precy, Junior Grand Warden John W. Dunbar, and Grand Secretary William C. Keen. The officers named on the charter for the ensuing 6-month term were: Demas Deming, Worshipful Master; Curtis Gilbert, Senior Warden; Robert Sturgus, Junior Warden. The named officers were installed on the same day that the charter was dated, September 13, 1821.

Peter Allen would serve two additional terms as the presiding officer in 1823, installed on May 19, and in 1825, installed on October 2.

== Military ==
War of 1812: On May 28, 1812, Peter Allen was appointed as the lieutenant colonel commanding the 20th Regiment Detached Militia, drawn from the various companies in Ontario County, as well as his own 22nd Regiment of Infantry (Allen's Regiment), New York State Militia, both under the command of Major General Stephen Van Rensselaer who was in command of the First Division of the New York State militia, which consisted of the Fourth through Eight Brigades.

Lieutenant Colonel Allen was captured by enemy forces on October 13, 1812, at the Battle of Queenston Heights and was honor bound to not take up arms until he had been informed of a prisoner swap that released him.

On December 10, 1814, Allen was discharged from the New York State Militia due to a consolidation of forces.

== Politics ==
Peter Allen served Honeoye, New York as its county supervisor in the Ontario County Legislature in 1812 until he received his commission as lieutenant colonel commanding the 20th and 22nd Infantry Regiments for the War of 1812.

After returning home from the War of 1812, Allen was elected to the New York State Assembly as the representative from Ontario County (Democratic Republican) in the 38th and 39th session.

In the 39th New York State Legislature (July 1, 1815 – June 30, 1816) the legislature, by vote, confirmed his election on January 31, 1816, due to 49 contested votes for Henry Fellows, therefore giving Peter Allen a 19-vote majority. As soon as the election was confirmed by the legislature it began being contested until on February 6, 1816, when Henry Fellows won and was seated giving the Federalist Party a 1-seat majority.

In 1818 Peter Allen ran for the Indiana General Assembly, to represent Davies, Knox, Sullivan and Vigo Counties, and was defeated (382 votes) by George R. C. Sullivan (773 votes), Robert Buntin (651 votes), and Joseph Warner (508 votes). Also running for the Indiana House of Representatives seat in 1818 were General Washington Johnston (491 votes), Samuel Emmison (388 votes), John MacDonald (355 votes), John McClure (142 votes), and N. Huntington (103 votes).

In 1819 Allen ran again for the Indiana House of Representatives, to represent Davies, Knox, Owen, Sullivan and Vigo Counties, and was elected (1028 votes) along with Joseph Warner (1069 votes). Also running were Thomas H. Blake (931 votes), Robert Buntin (683 votes), and George R. C. Sullivan (647 votes).

In 1820 Allen did not seek reelection to the Indiana House of Representatives and the election was won by George R. C. Sullivan, Robert Sturgus, John MacDonald.
