= Grand Lodge of Indiana =

Masonic organization

- Established: January 13, 1818; 208 years ago
- Location: United States
- Region served: Indiana
- Website: https://www.indianafreemasons.com

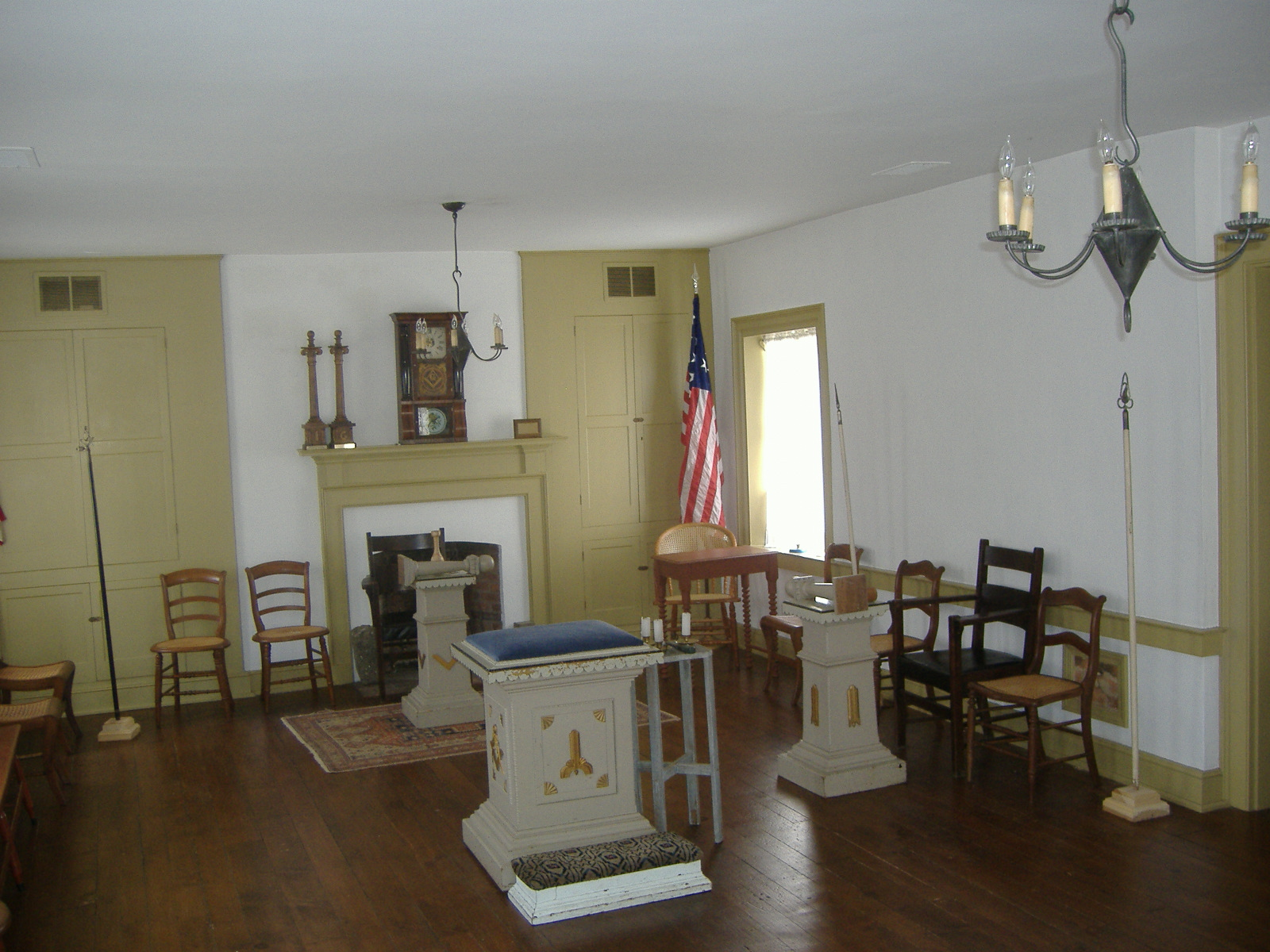
Meeting room where the Grand Lodge of Indiana was formed, at the Schofield House in Madison, Indiana

The Grand Lodge of Free & Accepted Masons of Indiana is one of two statewide organizations that oversee Masonic lodges in the state of Indiana. It was established on January 13, 1818. In 2016 the number of Freemasons in the Grand Lodge of Indiana was 55,553 amongst its 394 separate lodges, currently making it the sixth largest Masonic jurisdiction in the U.S. The Grand Lodge of Indiana's offices and archives are located in the Indianapolis Masonic Temple. The historically black Most Worshipful Prince Hall Grand Lodge of Indiana F&AM is the second regular Masonic grand lodge in the state, and it was originally established in 1856 as the Independent Union Grand Lodge of Free and Accepted Masons of the State of Indiana (National Compact). The two grand lodges agreed to mutual recognition in May 1998, and they jointly share sovereignty over the Masonic fraternity in Indiana.

== Pre-1900 ==
The first Lodge in Indiana was created by residents of Vincennes, Indiana. They sought a dispensation to create the Lodge from Louisville, Kentucky's Abraham Lodge #8 in 1806. One was granted in 1807, but due to the distance, they were not able to constitute the lodge. After a second dispensation was sought in 1808, a lodge was formed on March 13, 1809, and the officers were initiated. Other lodges in the Indiana Territory founded by the Grand Lodge of Kentucky were Madison (1815), Charlestown (1816), Melchizedek in Salem (1817), Pisgah in Corydon, Lawrenceburg, Rising Sun, and Vevay (1817). On May 9, 1817, the Grand Lodge of Ohio granted a dispensation for Brookville Harmony Lodge in Brookville, Indiana; this lodge would remain under the Grand Lodge of Ohio for two years following the founding of Indiana's Grand Lodge.

After Indiana attained statehood, it qualified for its own Grand Lodge. While attending the annual meeting of the Grand Lodge of Kentucky in September 1817, members of several lodges within the new state agreed to meet in Corydon with representative from all lodges and discuss the viability of forming a Grand Lodge with the State of Indiana. On December 3, 1817, discussion began as to whether a Grand Lodge for Indiana should be formed, 354 days after Indiana gained statehood. Eleven Freemasons from the various lodges in Indiana met in Corydon, and decided to initiate the new Grand Lodge. Amongst these was the first Lieutenant-governor of Indiana, Christopher Harrison. Thus, the Grand Lodge of Indiana was chartered on January 13, 1818, at the presently-named Schofield House, owned by Alexander Lanier, father of James Lanier and a Freemason as well, in Madison, Indiana. Only three Freemasons attended both meetings. The first Grand Master of Indiana was Alexander Buckner of Charlestown, who would later become a United States senator from Missouri.

The Grand Lodge would have its first annual meeting in Charlestown, and would alternate between several southern Indiana towns until its 1828 meeting at Indianapolis, where it has remained ever since.

Indiana would not escape the anti-Masonry hysteria of the 1820s-1840 that was touched off by the unexplained disappearance of William Morgan in upstate New York in 1826. In 1828 there were 33 lodges in Indiana; twenty of them had closed by 1835. In 1834 there was talk of dissolving the Grand Lodge, and by 1837 there were only twelve lodges left in Indiana. In many of the years between 1828 and 1842, the Grand Master did not even attend the Grand Lodge meetings. But by 1842 the anti-Masonic panic had waned, and American grand lodges slowly began to grow again.

Following the American Civil War, Freemasonry in the U.S. dramatically increased in popularity, along with the establishment of hundreds of new, similarly modeled fraternal organizations. The period from the late 1860s until the Great Depression of 1929 became known as the 'Golden Age of Fraternalism'. Between 1860 and 1870, Indiana's Masonic membership more than doubled, from 9,727 to 23,308.

== Post-1900 ==
In 1916 the Grand Lodge opened the Indiana Masonic Home to support elderly Masons, the widows and orphans of Master Masons, and older members of the Order of the Eastern Star. The Home still exists in Franklin, Indiana and changed its operating name to Compass Park in 2016.

Similar to the post-Civil War expansion, the years straddling World War I saw Indiana's Masonic membership dramatically increase from 54,710 in 1910 to 129,380 by 1930.

By 1957, there were more than 4 million Freemasons in the United States. The Grand Lodge of Indiana had its highest membership at that time with 546 lodges and 185,211 members, or 4% of the state's total population of 4.5 million. Indiana at that time was the fifth largest Masonic jurisdiction in the world. Indianapolis is also home to the two largest Masonic appendant body chapters in the U.S.: throughout the 20th and 21st centuries, the Indianapolis Valley of the Scottish Rite at the Scottish Rite Cathedral has been the world's largest Scottish Rite Valley; and the Murat Shrine has been the largest body of Shriners International.

Beginning in the early 1960s, the Grand Lodge of Indiana began erecting historical markers at sites with great Masonic significance. By 2022, 28 of these plaques had been placed across the state.

In 1987, the Masonic Library and Museum of Indiana was established to preserve and protect historical items and records of Indiana Freemasonry. Much of the initial collection was amassed for the 1968 sesquicentennial celebration of the Grand Lodge's founding, but that mission has continued and expanded. The MLMI is located today in the Indianapolis Masonic Temple, which is also the headquarters of the state's fraternity. It is open to the public.

There are also 24 active predominantly African-American, Prince Hall Affiliated (PHA) Masonic lodges in Indiana administered by the Most Worshipful Prince Hall Grand Lodge of Indiana F&AM, which was established September 16, 1856. The two Indiana grand lodges officially declared mutual recognition in 1998 and enjoy reciprocal visitation. In 2024 there were under 800 Prince Hall GL members of Indiana.

Famous Freemasons from Indiana include John Tipton, Oliver P. Morton, Lew Wallace, General Charles Cruft, Eugene V. Debs, Harvey Weir Cook, Art Nehf, Birch Evans Bayh Sr., Red Skelton, William H. Hudnut, Thomas Taggart, Dan Burton, Samuel Ralston, Colonel Harland Sanders, Dave Thomas, Chapman Jay Root, Caleb B. Smith, David Goodnow, Paul Page, Gus Grissom, and Carl Erskine.

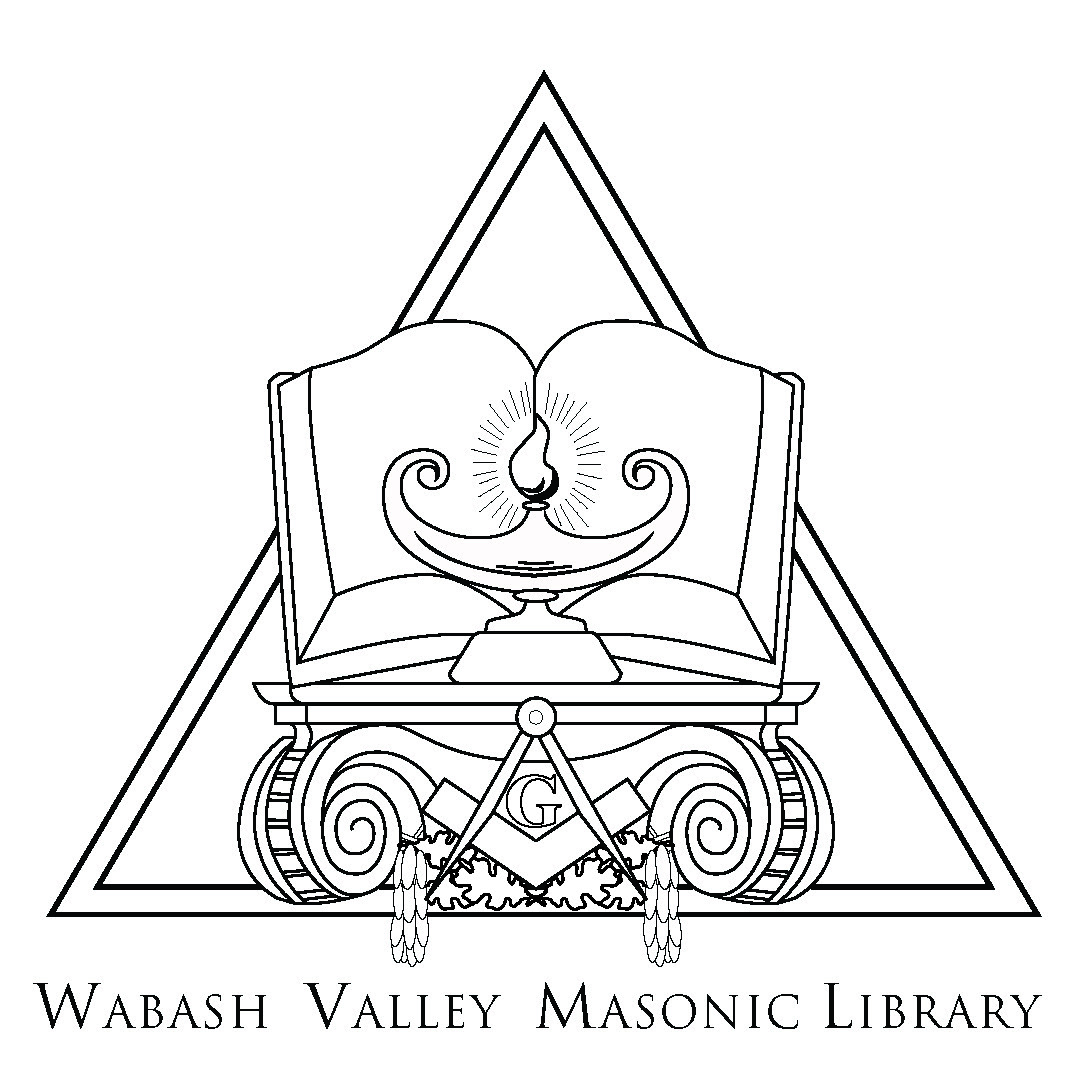

== Gallery ==
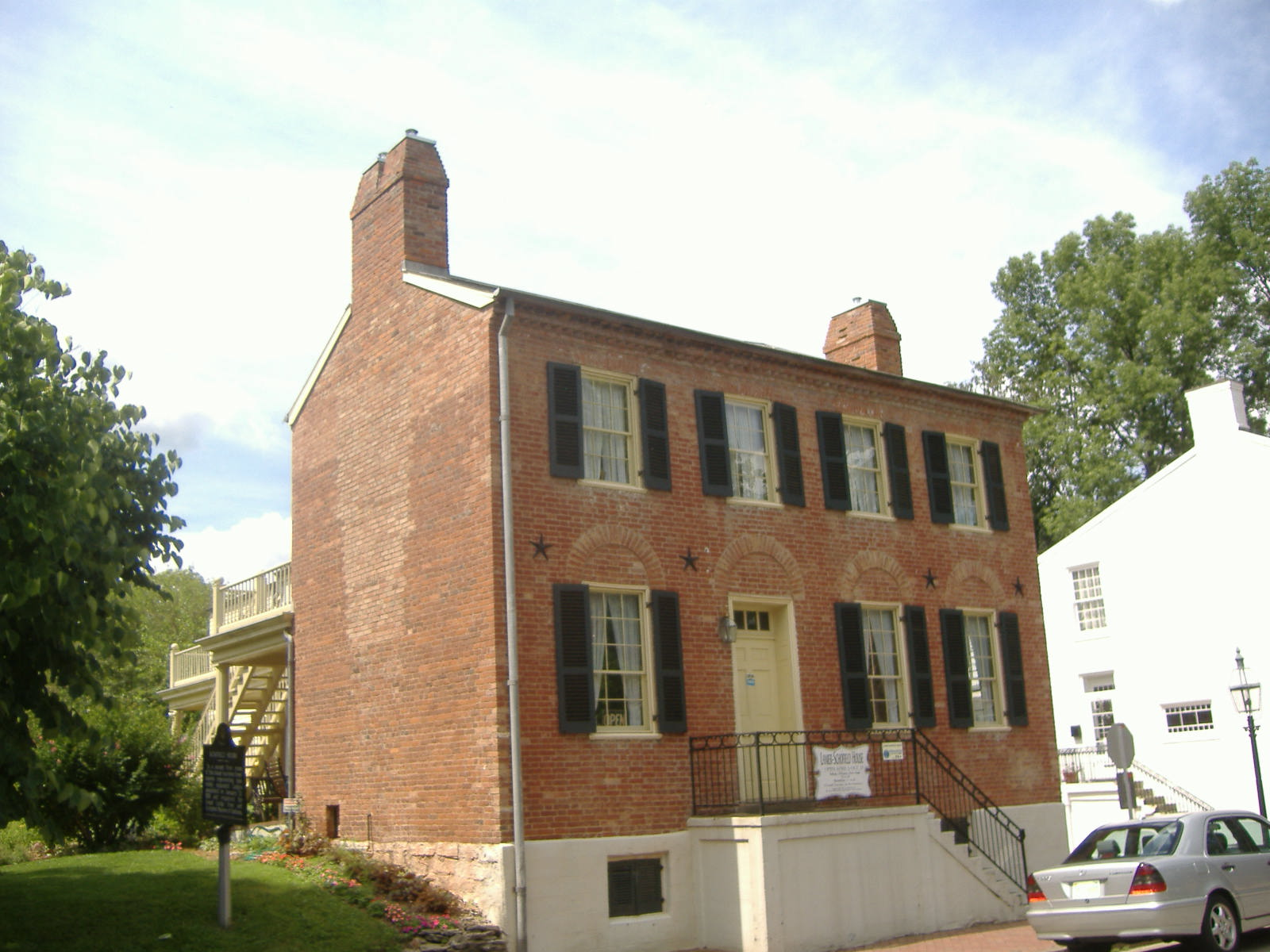
Schofield House, where the Grand Lodge was started

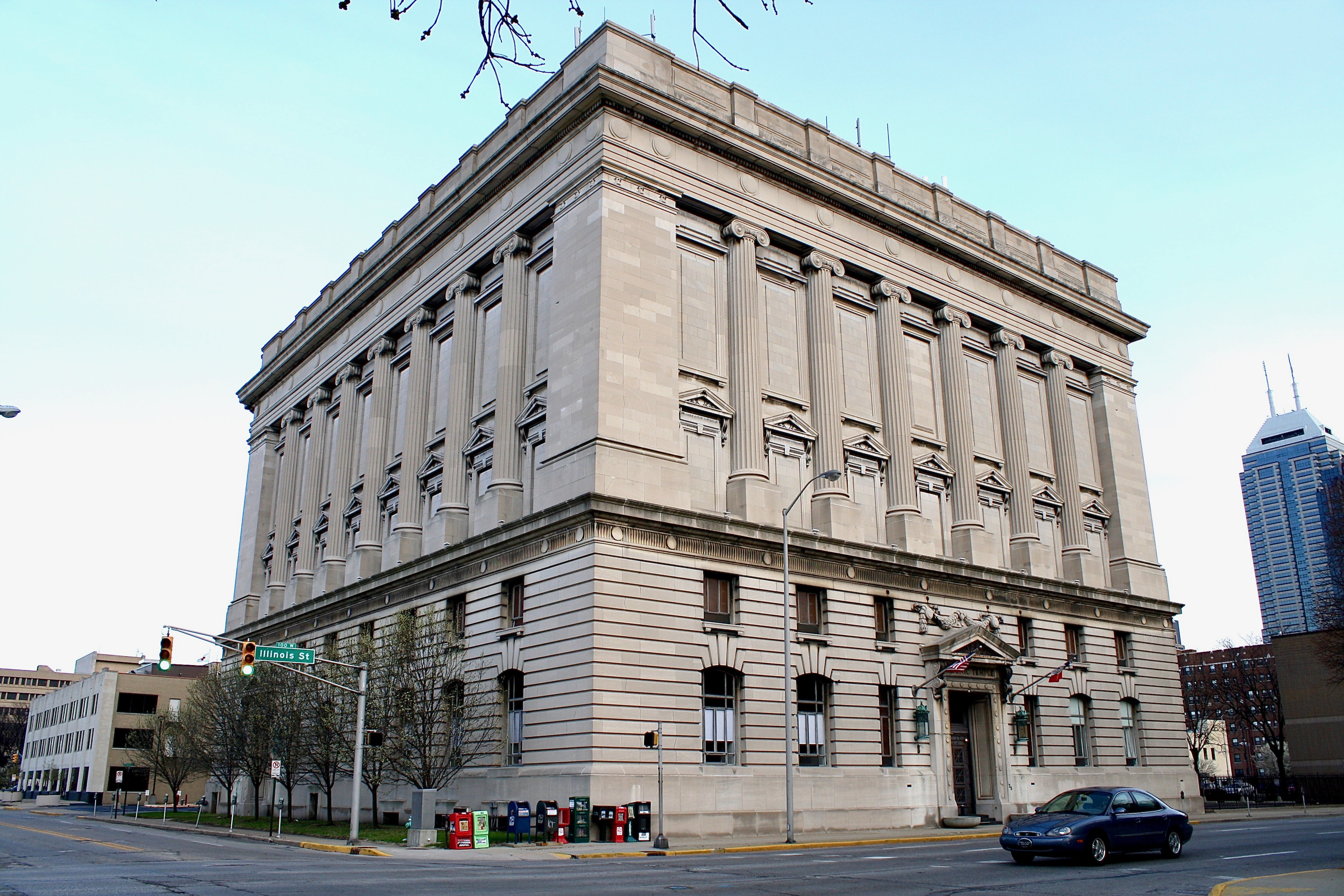
The Indianapolis Masonic Temple, also known as Indiana Freemasons Hall, is the headquarters of the Grand Lodge of Indiana.

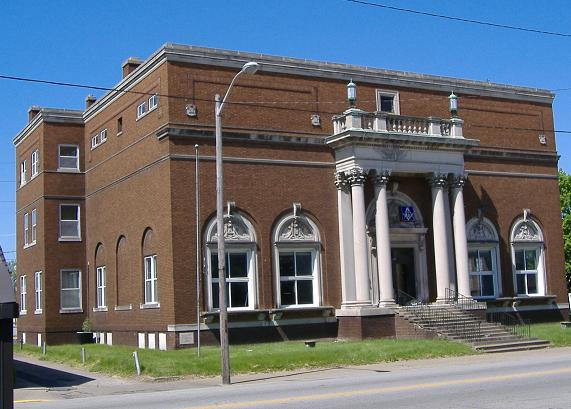
Early-20th Century Masonic Temple in Jeffersonville, Indiana

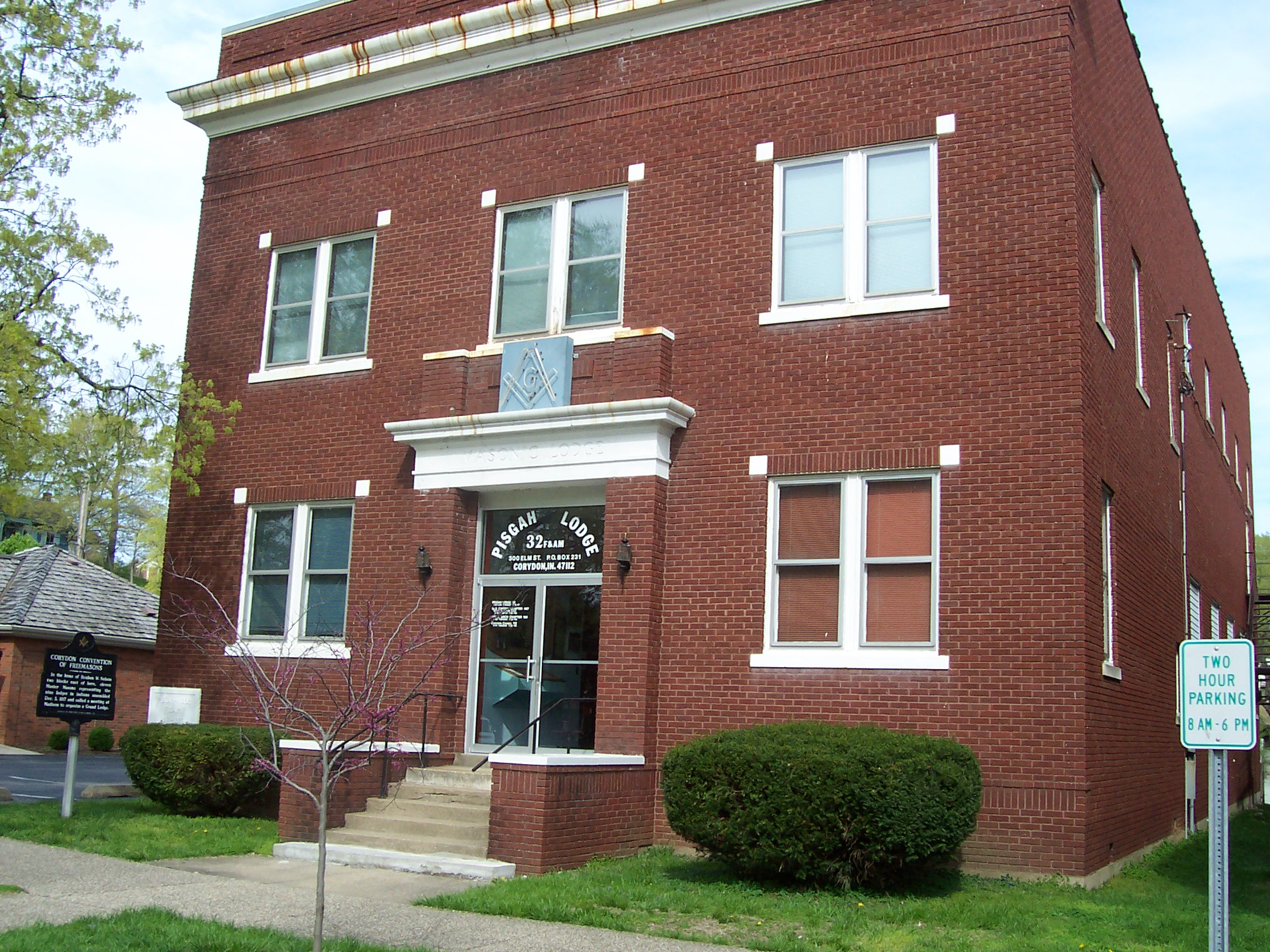
Corydon Lodge Hall, where many Masons who were initial state leaders of Indiana met.

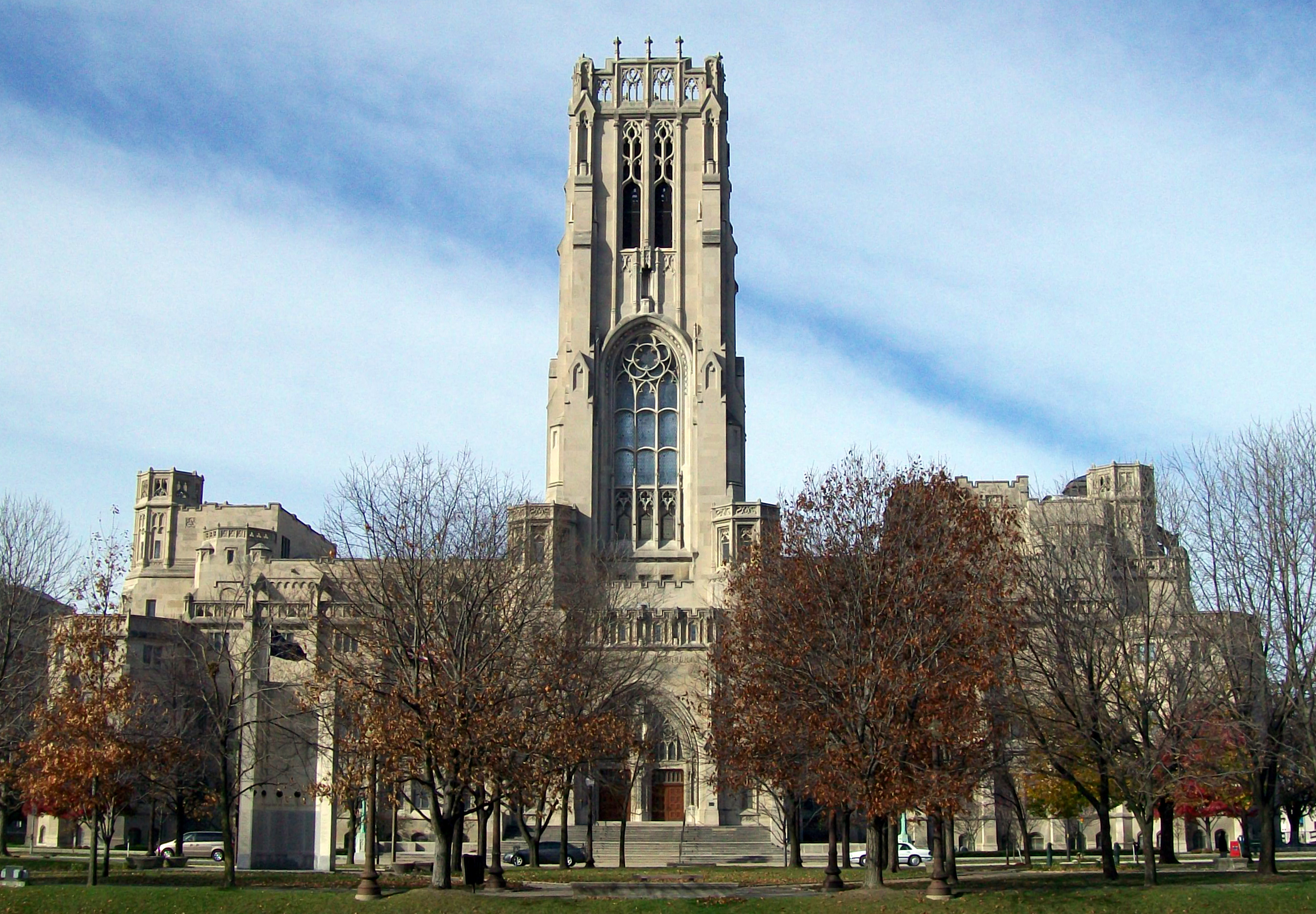
Scottish Rite Cathedral, Indianapolis
