= Edward W. McGaughey =

American politician (1817–1852)

Edward Wilson McGaughey
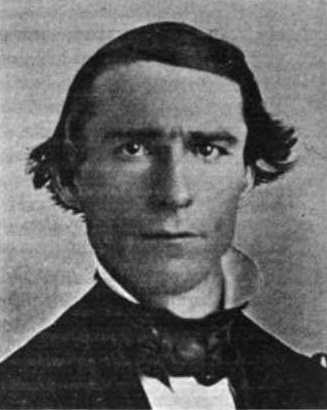
- Edward W. McGaughey, Indiana Congressman

Member of the U.S. House of Representatives from Indiana's 7th district
- In office March 4, 1845 – March 3, 1847
- Preceded by: Joseph A. Wright
- Succeeded by: Richard W. Thompson

Member of the U.S. House of Representatives from Indiana's 7th district
- In office March 4, 1849 – March 3, 1851
- Preceded by: Richard W. Thompson
- Succeeded by: John G. Davis

Personal details
- Born: January 16, 1817 Greencastle, Indiana, U.S.
- Died: August 6, 1852 (aged 35) San Francisco, California, U.S.
- Resting place: Yerba Buena Cemetery
- Party: Whig

Edward Wilson McGaughey (January 16, 1817 – August 6, 1852) was an American politician who served as U.S. Representative from Indiana.

== Biography ==
McGaughey was born near Greencastle, Indiana, and attended the public schools. He was the Deputy clerk of Putnam County. He was admitted to the bar in 1835 and commenced practice in Greencastle, Indiana. He served as a member of the Indiana House of Representatives in 1839 and 1840.

In 1842 McGaughey was prosecutor in the notable murder trial of Noah Beauchamp. He successfully got a conviction and death sentence for Beauchamp, which was the first legal execution in that county.

He served in the Indiana State Senate for the session from December 5, 1842, to February 13, 1843. He resigned before the beginning of the next session, and was an unsuccessful candidate for election to the Twenty-eighth Congress.

He was elected as a Whig to the Twenty-ninth Congress (March 4, 1845 – March 3, 1847). He was an unsuccessful candidate for reelection in 1846 to the Thirtieth Congress. He moved to Rockville, Indiana, in 1846 and resumed the practice of law.

McGaughey was elected to the Thirty-first Congress (March 4, 1849 – March 3, 1851), and was an unsuccessful candidate for reelection in 1850 to the Thirty-second Congress. While in Congress he voted for the Fugitive Slave Act, being only one of three Whigs who did so. He was nominated by President Taylor as Governor of Minnesota Territory in 1849, but the Senate failed to confirm the nomination.

He moved to California in 1852.

== Death and legacy ==
He died in San Francisco, California, on August 6, 1852, from Panama fever, a form of malaria, which he contracted aboard the steamer Winifred Scott while en route to San Francisco. He was interred in Yerba Buena Cemetery (later moved to Golden Gate Cemetery around 1870).

For a time, Edward McGaughey's political career paralleled that of Abraham Lincoln. McGaughey, the only Whig in Indiana's ten-man Congressional delegation, served in the 29th and 31st Congresses. Lincoln, the only Whig in Illinois' seven-man delegation, served in the 30th Congress.

The two men were also candidates for appointment to become territorial governor when a Whig, Zachary Taylor, was elected President of the United States. McGaughey was President Taylor's choice for territorial governor of Minnesota. The U.S. Senate failed to confirm the nomination because McGaughey had voted against a bill authorizing supplies for the Mexican war. Lincoln was President Taylor's choice to become territorial governor of Oregon. Lincoln turned the appointment down because his wife, Mary, did not want to live so far away from civilization.

Lincoln wanted President Taylor to appoint him commissioner of the General Land Office but the position was not offered. Lincoln wrote to his law partner, Joshua Speed: "I believe that, so far as the whigs in congress, are concerned, I could have the Genl. Land Office almost by common consent; but then Sweet, and Don: Morrison, and Browning, and Cyrus Edwards all want it. And what is worse, while I think I could easily take it myself, I fear I shall have trouble to get it for any other man in Illinois. The reason is, that McGaughey, an Indiana ex-member of congress is here after it; and being personally known, he will be hard to beat by anyone who is not."

U.S. House of Representatives
Preceded by Joseph A. Wright	Member of the U.S. House of Representatives from Indiana's 7th congressional district 1845–1847	Succeeded by Richard W. Thompson
Preceded by Richard W. Thompson	Member of the U.S. House of Representatives from Indiana's 7th congressional district 1849–1851	Succeeded by John G. Davis
