= John G. Davis =

American politician (1810–1866)

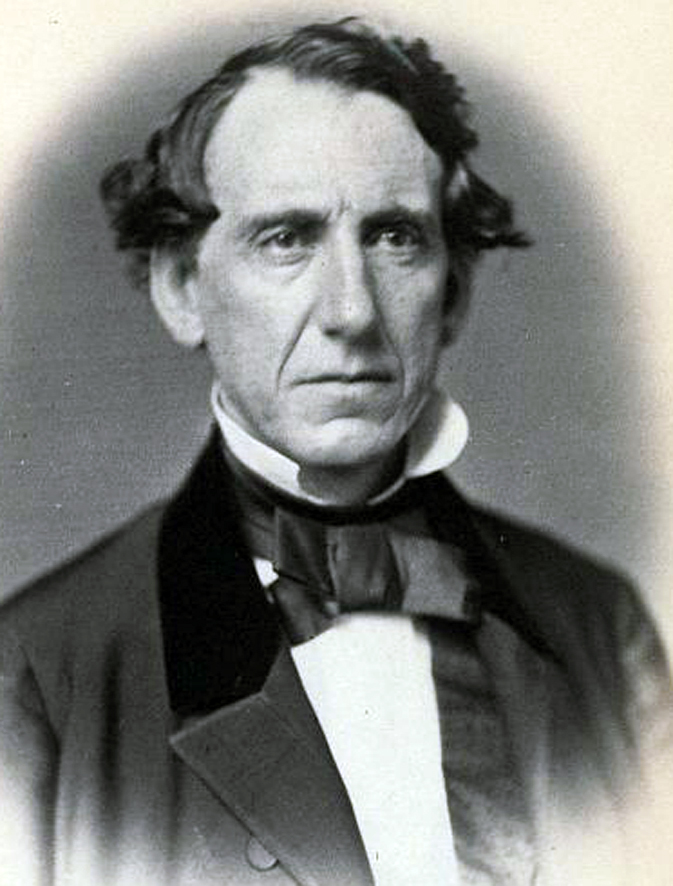

Member of the U.S. House of Representatives from Indiana's 7th district
- In office March 4, 1851 – March 3, 1855; March 4, 1857 – March 3, 1861
- Preceded by: Edward W. McGaughey; Harvey D. Scott
- Succeeded by: Harvey D. Scott; Daniel W. Voorhees

Personal details
- Born: John Givan Davis; October 10, 1810 Flemingsburg, Kentucky, U.S.
- Died: January 18, 1866 (aged 55) Terre Haute, Indiana, U.S.
- Resting place: Highland Lawn Cemetery
- Party: Democratic
- Occupation: Businessman, politician

John Givan Davis (October 10, 1810 – January 18, 1866) was an American politician who served four terms as a U.S. representative from Indiana in the mid-19th century.

== Early life ==
Born near Flemingsburg, Kentucky, Davis moved to Indiana with his parents, who settled in Rockville, Parke County, in 1819. He attended the country schools and engaged in agricultural pursuits. He served as Sheriff of Parke County from 1830 to 1833, and clerk of the county court from 1833 to 1850.

== Congress ==
Davis was elected as a Democrat to the 32nd and 33rd Congresses but was unsuccessful for re-election in 1854 to the 34th Congress. He was elected as a Democrat to the 35th Congress and re-elected as an Anti-Lecompton Democrat to the 36th Congress, he was not a candidate for renomination in 1860 to the Thirty-seventh Congress.

== Later life ==
Following his political career Davis engaged in mercantile pursuits and meat packing in Montezuma, Indiana, and moved to Terre Haute, Indiana, and engaged in business as a dry-goods merchant.

=== Death ===
He died in Terre Haute, Indiana, on January 18, 1866, and was interred in Highland Lawn Cemetery.

U.S. House of Representatives
Preceded by Edward W. McGaughey	Member of the U.S. House of Representatives from Indiana's 7th congressional district 1851 – 1855	Succeeded by Harvey D. Scott
Preceded by Harvey D. Scott	Member of the U.S. House of Representatives from Indiana's 7th congressional district 1857 – 1861	Succeeded by Daniel W. Voorhees
