= Schofield House =

- U.S. Historic district – Contributing property
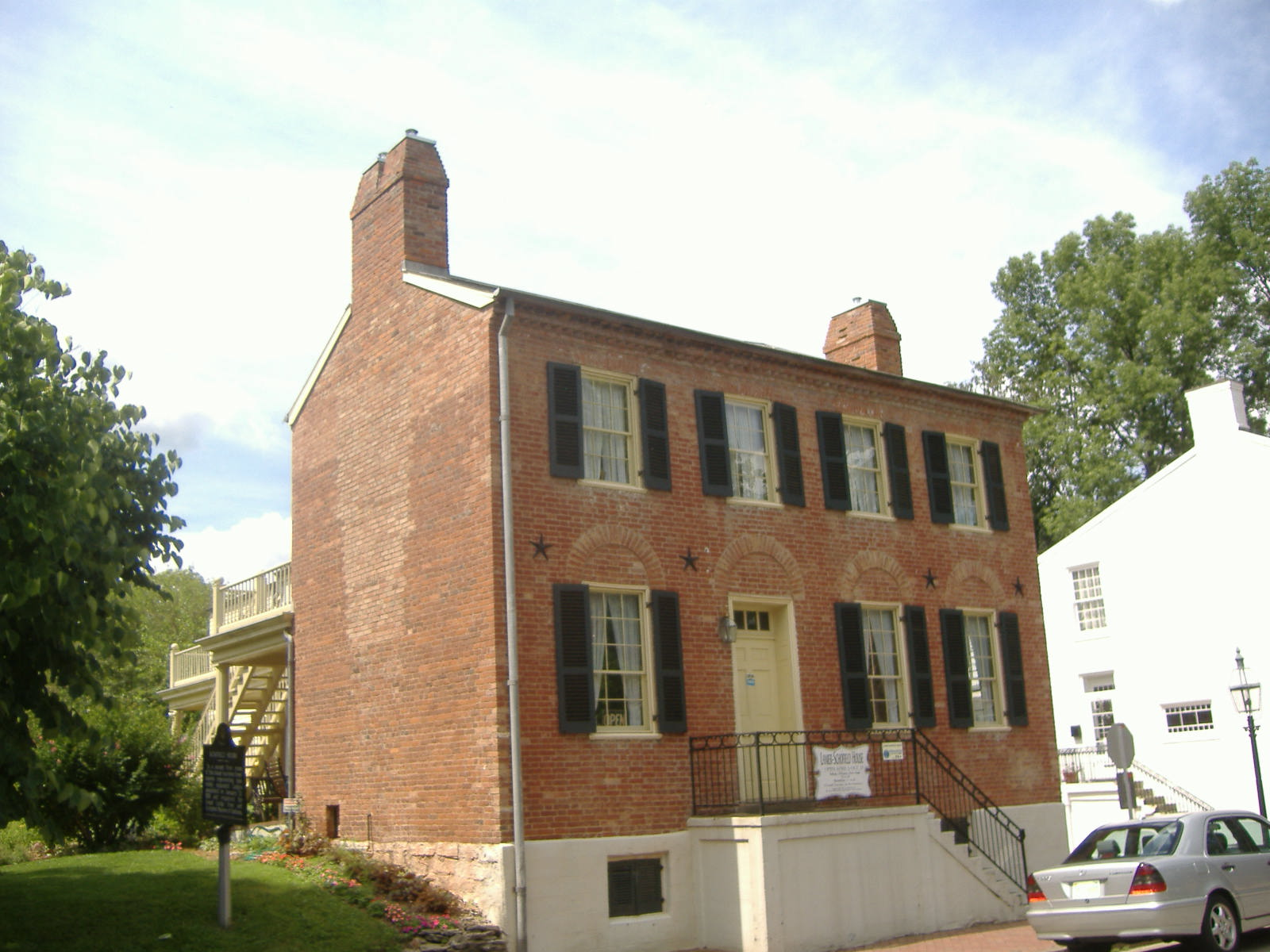

- Location within Indiana
- Location: Madison, Indiana
- Coordinates: 38.73536°N 85.3822°W
- Built: 1817
- Architectural style: Federal-style
- Part of: Madison Historic District (ID73000020)
- Added to NRHP: March 20, 2006

The Schofield House, also known as the Lanier-Schofield House, is an historic building located in the Madison Historic District of Madison, Indiana. Built in 1817, this Federal-style building was the first two-story brick house and the first tavern house in Madison. It was also here, on January 13, 1818, that the Grand Lodge of Indiana, the organization of Freemasons in Indiana, was founded.

== History ==
The first residents of the house were Alexander and Drusilla Lanier, parents of James Lanier; they or a William Robinson may have had the house built to begin with in 1817. The house initially had a bedroom, kitchen, and tavern room on the first floor, and a sleeping lot and meeting room on the second floor. Later additions to the house allowed for the initial bedroom to be made into a parlor, and the kitchen become a dining room.

On January 13, 1818, fourteen Masons throughout Indiana met at the upstairs meeting room, after agreeing to meet there to establish a Grand Lodge for Indiana the previous month in Corydon, Indiana. Alexander Lanier was himself a Freemason, and his newly built tavern could support a lodge room being set up in the upstairs meeting room. It was here that the constitution to start the Grand Lodge of Indiana was approved, and nine lodges from Indiana demitted from the Grand Lodge of Kentucky to form the initial lodges of the Grand Lodge of Indiana. There is no evidence it was ever used again for Masonic ceremonies for 150 years afterwards.

After James Lanier sold the building, it would remain in the hands of the Schofield family. In 1972 it was acquired from the family by the Ancient Accepted Scottish Rite in the Valley of Indianapolis. Three years later it was restored to become a Masonic museum, opening on April 19, 1975.

Today, dues from Indiana Freemasons and donations fund the house. Admission to enter the house is charged for all who are not Freemasons. Degree work is sometimes done, but due to the smallness of the lodge room (set to be reflective of 19th century lodge rooms, and not how it looked in January 1818), only Entered Apprentice degrees are recommended there.

== Gallery ==
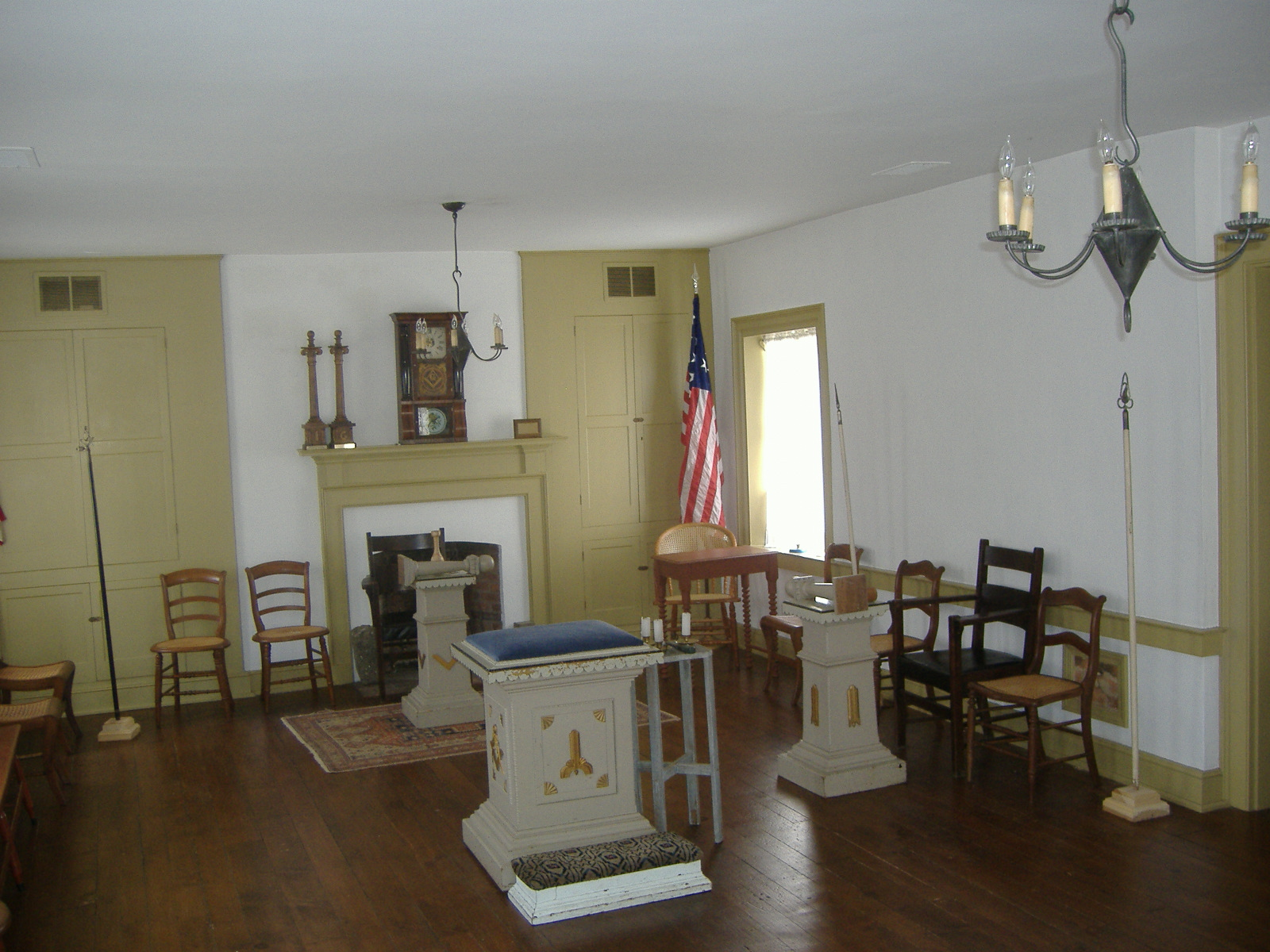
Upstairs meeting room, where the Grand Lodge of Indiana was founded.

== See also ==
- List of Masonic buildings in Indiana
- National Register of Historic Places listings in Jefferson County, Indiana
