= Fred Newton Scott =

American writer (1860–1931)

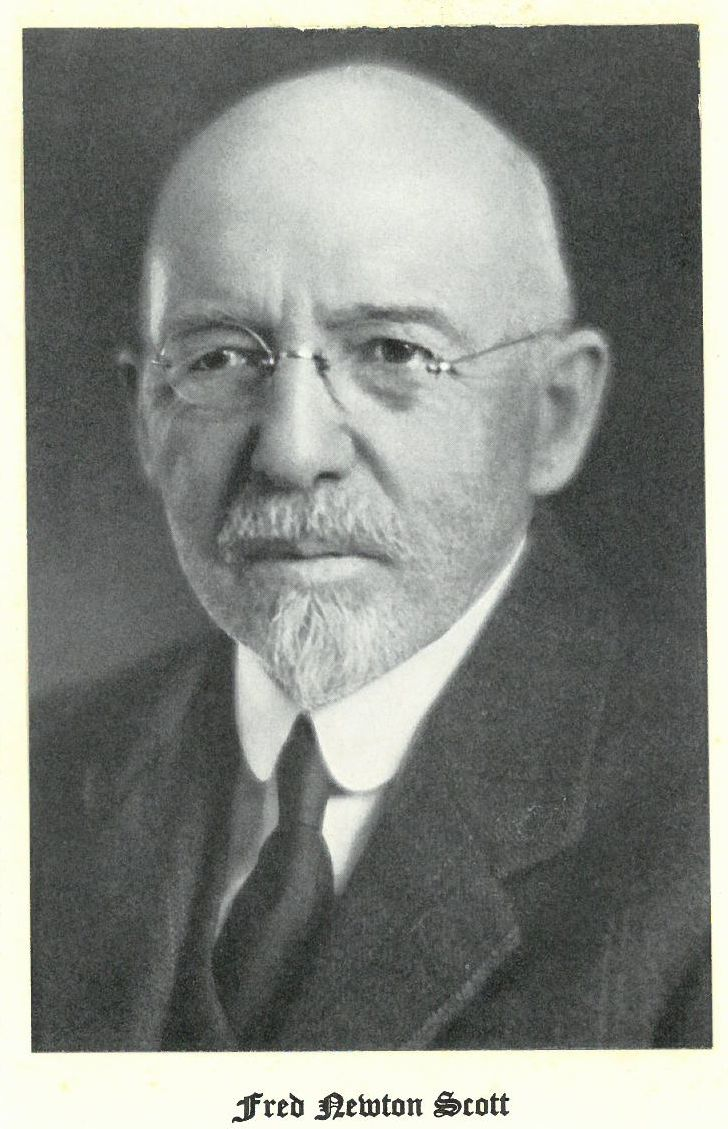
- Born: August 20, 1860; Terre Haute, Indiana
- Died: May 29, 1930 (aged 69); San Diego, California

Academic background
- Education: University of Michigan

Academic work
- Main interests: Rhetoric

Fred Newton Scott (1860–1931) was an American writer, educator and rhetorician. Scott received his A.B., A.M, and Ph.D. from the University of Michigan. In the preface to The New Composition Rhetoric, Newton Scott states “that composition is…a social act, and the student [should] therefore constantly [be] led to think of himself as writing or speaking for a specified audience. Thus not mere expression but communication as well is made the business of composition.” Fred Newton Scott saw rhetoric as an intellectually challenging subject. He looked to English departments to balance work in rhetoric and linguistics in addition to literary study.

== Questions facing 19th-century rhetoricians ==
Rhetoric in the 1890s was full of vigorous experimentation in rhetorical theory and practice. The Harvard Reports of 1892, 1895, and 1897 generated much public interest and concern about the teaching of writing. At this time, composition was shifting away from an emphasis on oratory skills. The 19th-century American University was experiencing a major transformation in its educational purposes. Education was opening up to everyone, including women. Classical rhetoric was being displaced as schools responded to more practical needs, like preparing their students to be excellent employees.

Originally, classical rhetoric studies were geared to composition that included emotional and ethical appeals in addition to logical ones. The purpose of oratory skills at this point was persuasion and included a concern of the emotional disposition of the audience. The classical composer shaped the work to be appealing. The composer was to discover the best possible reasons for their argument and persuade the audience to accept their point of view.

This belief system began to change. Current-traditionalists were not concerned with probabilities and the subjects were essentially factual or able to be proven. The goal was not to persuade anyone to a particular conclusion. Rather, the focus was just to present the information to the audience and let them do with it what they will. This new method affected the tone and arrangement of the work. Instead of arranging the piece to convince the audience of something, they just arranged it to reflect a rational thought process that the audience could follow. The arrangement became deductive; it was just a way to report facts.

Questions for 19th century rhetoricians:

1. How relevant is psychology to composition?

2. How can the change in practical teaching skills caused by a changing social climate best be dealt with?

3. Is teaching grammar really beneficial to the composing process?

4. What is the relationship between rhetoric and literary studies?

5. Should the focus of writing instruction be parts-to-whole or whole-to parts?

== John Dewey’s influence ==
Fred Newton Scott promoted a drive for social efficiency by promoting a democratic rhetoric that responded to the progressive agenda of John Dewey. John Dewey was a highly influential figure in Scott's life. Dewey believed in a progressive style of education that was a holistic experience. Both men attended the same college and they spent much time discussing and debating the current theory of rhetoric. Scott based most of his work on social rhetoric on the progressive ideals John Dewey advocated. Their close ties are demonstrated by the flattering and highly complimentary biographical pieces each wrote on the other.

== Classical Rhetoric ==
Fred Newton Scott encouraged a Platonic concept of writing. He stressed that writing is a social act that may be used as a method of seeking the truth. “Although he advocates the Aristotelian concept of adapting the message to the audience, he does not simply view meaning as external to the writing process; instead he believes that meaning is created through the interaction between interlocutor and the audience. Scott shares Plato’s concern for the welfare of the community and the belief that good discourse is that which by disseminating truth creates a healthy public opinion and thus effects, in Plato’s words, ‘a training and improvement in the souls of the citizens.’” Scott also illustrated the importance of the audience within the system. “He was also often described as a ‘Socratic’ teacher, using a question-and-discovery method of teaching to inspire his students to learn material on their own rather than repeating information given by the teacher.” Scott did not follow the current traditional theory of rhetoric as it left out the importance of the audience. Instead, he advanced the view that by considering the audience, the author is reminded of the social nature of studying composition.

== Social rhetoric ==
Progressivism, as applied to individuals, refers to a group of social reformers active around the beginning of the 20th century. Included in their ranks were educators, like John Dewey, social welfare workers, like Jane Addams, and journalists, like Lincoln Steffens. Their core belief is that the survival of the nation was dependent on the achievement of a virtuous democracy. Scott also felt it was important that Americans unite under a common ideology.

“The most prominent characteristic of this ideology was engagement with a set of political and civil ideals stemming from the legacy of republicanism: commitment to the public good and the health of the nation; a belief in liberty so that all could be free to participate in public affairs; the creation of community, so that all would share an equal existence among others sharing and participating in the same commitments.”

Scott viewed the educational experience as self-development within a democratic environment, and was a method of training young minds to be active participants in a democratic society. In essence, Scott viewed writing as a social act performed through a complex interaction of writer, audience, subject, and language. Due to his concern for social reform and harmony, and for the preparation for economic integration, education should be used for the good of all; it should be used to prepare citizens for democracy.

Writing should be taught within a complete rhetorical situation, a situation that was thoroughly social without denying the importance of the individual. Scott, in his work “A Substitute,” describes writing as:

“essential for building character…moral courage, self-reliance, respect for the truth in every aspect…sympathy for our fellow human beings, and an active desire to help them and co-operate with them, a love of justice and fair play, belief in democratic institutions, [and] loyalty to our republic.”

Scott saw an intrinsic connection between the essay and the survival of the nation, and he argued that mastering the conventions associated with this form would bring with it assimilation of the values that he believed would ensure that survival. In Two Ideals of Composition Instruction, Scott argued that mastering the right sort of English was crucial for the survival of the nation.

“Language [i]s the mode by which culture is imparted…and with mastery of the mother tongue [came] the obligation to use this great instrument for the training and instruction of the souls of the citizens.”

Scott saw a number of factors threatening this. In his essay English Composition as a Mode of Behavior, Scott probed the causes of the errors occurring in the transmission of values reflected in the language that was necessary for the perpetuation of the culture. Scott determined that there were two main causes for the student errors that came out of the breakup of community during this period: the influence of spoken foreign languages and the breaking up of the family tradition. The three evidences he cites as the breakup of family tradition are: the Sunday newspaper, the telephone, and the automobile. In other words, Scott felt that media that was used for communication broke up the family unit.

Scott also contrasted two different styles of speech and illustrated the distinctions between them. The first he called degraded speech and he compares it to a foreign language or media language. The second is acceptable speech, which represents the family language and is more acceptable in school because it has fewer errors than degraded speech. Scott recommended two solutions to encourage the nation to form common goals and bonds. The first is to give the people and education because with this information they will feel part owner in the system and actively participate. The second is that it will encourage individual achievement and satisfaction and they will continue to focus on their own development.

== Works ==
- Scott, Fred Newton, and Gertrude Buck. A Brief English Grammar. Chicago: Scott, Foresman, 1905.
- Scott, Fred Newton, and Joseph Villiers Denney. Composition-Literature. Boston:Allyn and Bacon, 1902.
- Scott, Fred Newton, and Joseph Villiers Denney. Composition-Rhetoric, Designed For Use in Secondary Schools. Boston: Allyn and Bacon, 1897.
- Scott, Fred Newton, and Joseph Villiers Denney. “Elementary English Composition”. New ed. Boston: Allyn and Bacon, 1900, 1908.
- Scott, Fred Newton. "English at the University of Michigan." Dial 17 (1894): 82–84.
- Scott, Fred Newton. "English Composition as a Mode of Behavior." English Journal 11 (1922): 463–473.
- Scott, Fred Newton, and Joseph Villiers Denney. “The New Composition-Rhetoric”. Boston: Allyn and Bacon, 1911.
- Scott, Fred Newton. "Our Problems." English Journal 2 (1913): 1–10.
- Scott, Fred Newton, and Joseph Villiers Denney. Paragraph-Writing: A Rhetoric for Colleges. New ed. Boston : Allyn and Bacon, 1909.
- Scott, Fred Newton, ed. and intro. The Philosophy of Style. By Herbert Spencer. 2nd ed. Boston: Allyn and Bacon, 1892.
- Scott, Fred Newton. The Principles of Style. Ann Arbor, MI: Register Publishing, 1890.
- Scott, Fred Newton, ed. and intro. The Principles of Success in Literature. By George Henry Lewes. Boston: Allyn and Bacon, 1891.
- Scott, Fred Newton. References on the Teaching of Rhetoric and Composition. N.P., n.d.
- Scott, Fred Newton. "The Report on College-Entrance Requirements in English." Educational Review 20 (1900): 289–294.
- Scott, Fred Newton. "Rhetoric Rediviva." 1909. Rpt. College Composition and Communication 31 (1980): 413–19.
- Scott, Fred Newton. "The Standard of American Speech." The English Journal 6(January 1917): 1–15. Rpt. A Various Language: Perspectives on American Dialects. Ed. Juanita V. Williamson and Virginia M. Burke. New York: Holt, Rinehart & Winston, 1971. 3–12.
- Scott, Fred Newton. The Standard of American Speech and Other Papers. Boston: Allyn and Bacon, 1926.
- Scott, Fred Newton. The Teaching of English in the Elementary and the Secondary School. By George Rice Carpenter. New York: Longmans, Green, 1903.
- Scott, Fred Newton. "What the West Wants in Preparatory English." School Review 17 (1909): 19.
- Scott, Fred Newton, and Gertrude Buck. A Brief English Grammar. Chicago: Scott, Foresman, 1905.

== See also ==
Stewart, Donald C. & Stewart, Patricia L. The Life and Legacy of Fred Newton Scott. University of Pittsburgh Press, 1997.
