= Scottish Rite Cathedral (Indianapolis) =

Historic building in Indianapolis, Indiana, US

- U.S. National Register of Historic Places
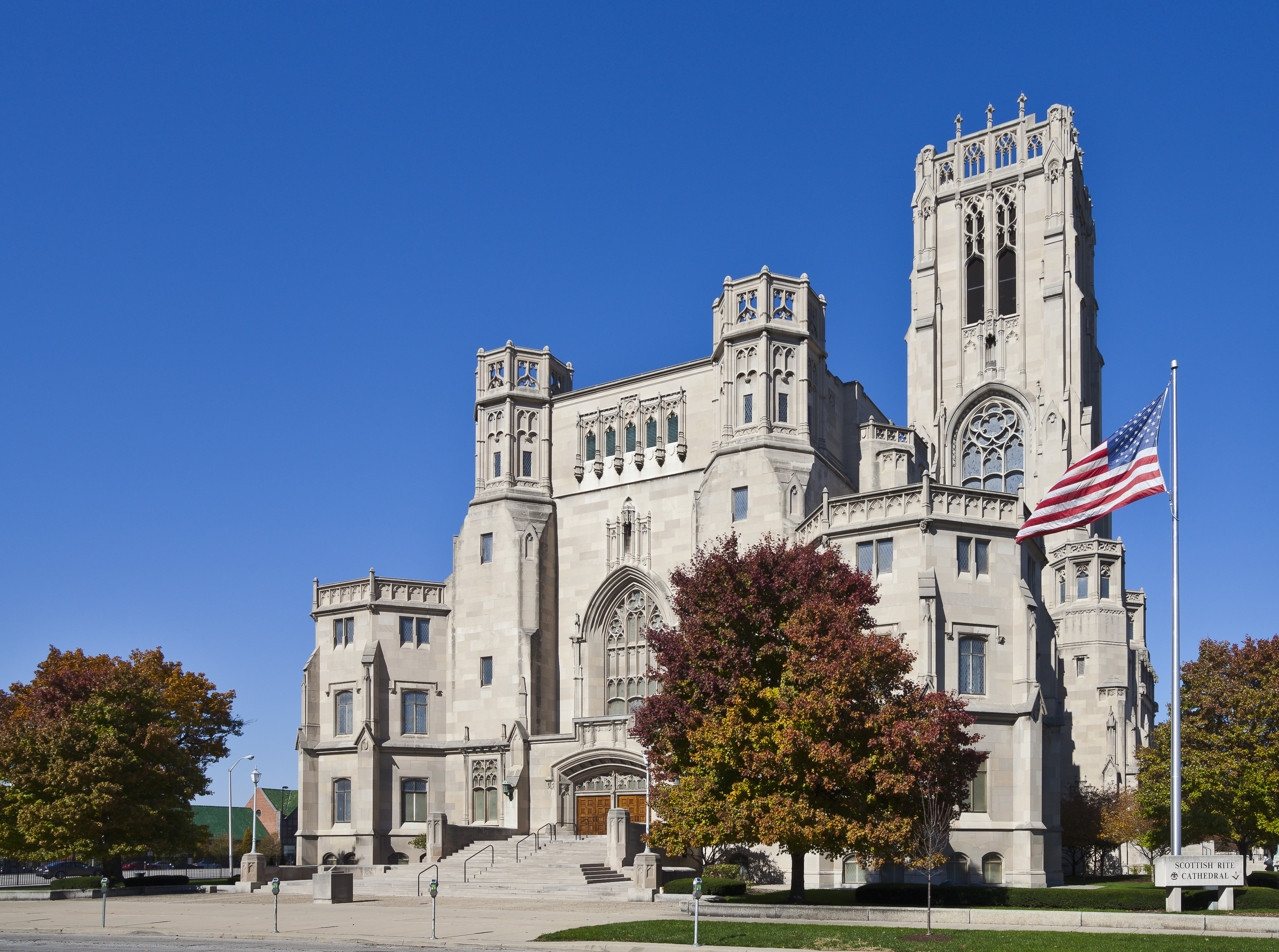
- The Scottish Rite Cathedral

- Location within Indianapolis Location within Indianapolis Location within Indiana Location within the United States
- Location: 650 N. Meridian St., Indianapolis, Indiana, U.S.
- Coordinates: 39°46′34.07″N 86°9′28.77″W
- Area: 1.8 acres (0.73 ha)
- Built: 1927
- Built by: Hunkin-Conkey Construction Compa
- Architect: George F. Schreiber
- Architectural style: Tudor Gothic
- NRHP reference No.: 83000136
- Added to NRHP: June 6, 1983

The Scottish Rite Cathedral is a historic building designed by architect George F. Schreiber and located in Downtown Indianapolis, Indiana, United States. It is owned by the Valley of Indianapolis Scottish Rite, an affiliated body of Freemasonry. It was built between 1927 and 1929 at the cost of $2.5 million. The cathedral is one of the largest Masonic buildings in the world and the largest Scottish Rite building anywhere. It has been described as one of the finest examples of Neo-Gothic architecture in the United States.

In a 1996 poll, the Indianapolis Business Journal found the cathedral to be the most popular historic building in the city, and the second favorite building of any type. In recent years it has received about 100,000 visitors a year. The Cathedral makes up a triad of major Masonic landmarks in downtown Indianapolis, consisting of itself, the Indianapolis Masonic Temple to its south, and the Murat Shrine Center on Alabama Street.

== Design ==
Every dimension of the structure (in feet) is evenly divisible by three (reflecting the three degrees in Freemasonry), with many also being divisible by 33 (reflecting the degrees a member of the Scottish Rite can achieve). The dominant feature of the exterior is the ‘Singing Tower’ which rises 212 feet (65 m) and contains the cathedral's carillon. The carillon consists of 54 bells collectively weighing 56,372 pounds, making it one of the largest in the United States. The top of the tower is ornamented with 12 fleur-de-lis, which from the sidewalk appear to be passion crosses. The four lobes of these fleur-de-lis extend to the north, south, east, and west, again symbolizing the universality of Masonry.

The sculptured figures over the main entrance on the building's east side at the base of the tower depict King Solomon of Israel, Hiram I King of Tyre, and three condemned stonemasons from Solomon's Temple. According to Masonic lore, these 'ruffians' murdered King Solomon's master builder, Hiram Abiff, at the completion of the erection of the Temple at Jerusalem. Other stone carvings depict various aspects of the Scottish Rite, and its motto, “Spes Mea In Deo Est” (My hope is in God), is carved into the limestone lintels above the doors.

At the eastern and southern entrances to the cathedral, large bronze medallions are set into travertine marble floors. The detailed ornamentation of these embellished centerpieces display the 12 signs of the zodiac and the four principal degrees of the Scottish Rite. Together they represent the universality of the Masonic fraternity. The main entrance, known as the Tiler's Room, is a 33-foot (10 m) cube.

Throughout the cathedral are over 100 'stained glass' windows (actually painted glass) that depict the three craft lodge degrees of Masonry, the degrees of the Scottish Rite, symbols of York Rite Freemasonry, plus images of liberal arts, sciences, and even technology of the 1920s at the time of its construction.

The ballroom is constructed with a floating floor, where the entire floor is laid on felt cushions. This type of construction, also known as a sprung floor, provides 'give' to the floor which tends to relieve dancers' feet. The ballroom also embodies the number 33 by being 99 feet (30 m) square, with pillars defining the dancing area as 66 ft (20 m) square, and the white oak floor panels being 33 in (840 mm) square. The chandelier has 200 lights and weighs 2,500 lb (1,100 kg). The ballroom was designed in an Elizabethan architectural style.

The theater stage features more than 50 hand-painted scenic backdrops for various scenes of the 29 Scottish Rite degree presentations. They are operated by 12 miles of rope. The proscenium arch of the stage is 38 feet wide and 28 feet high. The architecture is Cathedral Gothic, sometimes referred to as Medieval Gothic, and was patterned in large part after the details of the Cologne Cathedral. The woodwork, panels, and trim are Russian curly oak. The wall panels are embellished in Gothic motif and are shaded from dark near the floor to lighter toward the ceiling. These symbolize how Scottish Rite teachings bring its members from darkness to light. The carvings on the trusses and woodwork were created by the sons of Anton Lang who was famous for playing the part of Christ in the passion play at Oberammergau, Germany. The four robust cherubs on each side of the theater and the two on either side of the stage holding plaques to their breasts are symbolic references to the Ten Commandments. About 1,100 persons can be seated in the theater and another 200 on chairs on the floor in the arena area.

The Valley of Indianapolis is the only Scottish Rite Valley in the nation with an orchestra in residence, the Scottish Rite Orchestra, conducted by Ill. Jeffrey S. Warbinton, 33˚. The orchestra was founded in 1946 by Fabien Sevitzky, then conductor of the Indianapolis Symphony Orchestra.

Indiana's Scottish Rite Masons are a part of the Ancient Accepted Scottish Rite Northern Masonic Jurisdiction.

The downstairs features the Double Eagle Cafe which is open to the public on weekdays for lunch. Guided tours of the cathedral are available on Tuesday through Friday from 10:00 AM to 2:00 PM.

== See also ==
- List of Masonic buildings in Indiana
- List of attractions and events in Indianapolis
- List of tallest buildings in Indianapolis § Other structures
- National Register of Historic Places listings in Center Township, Marion County, Indiana

== Gallery ==
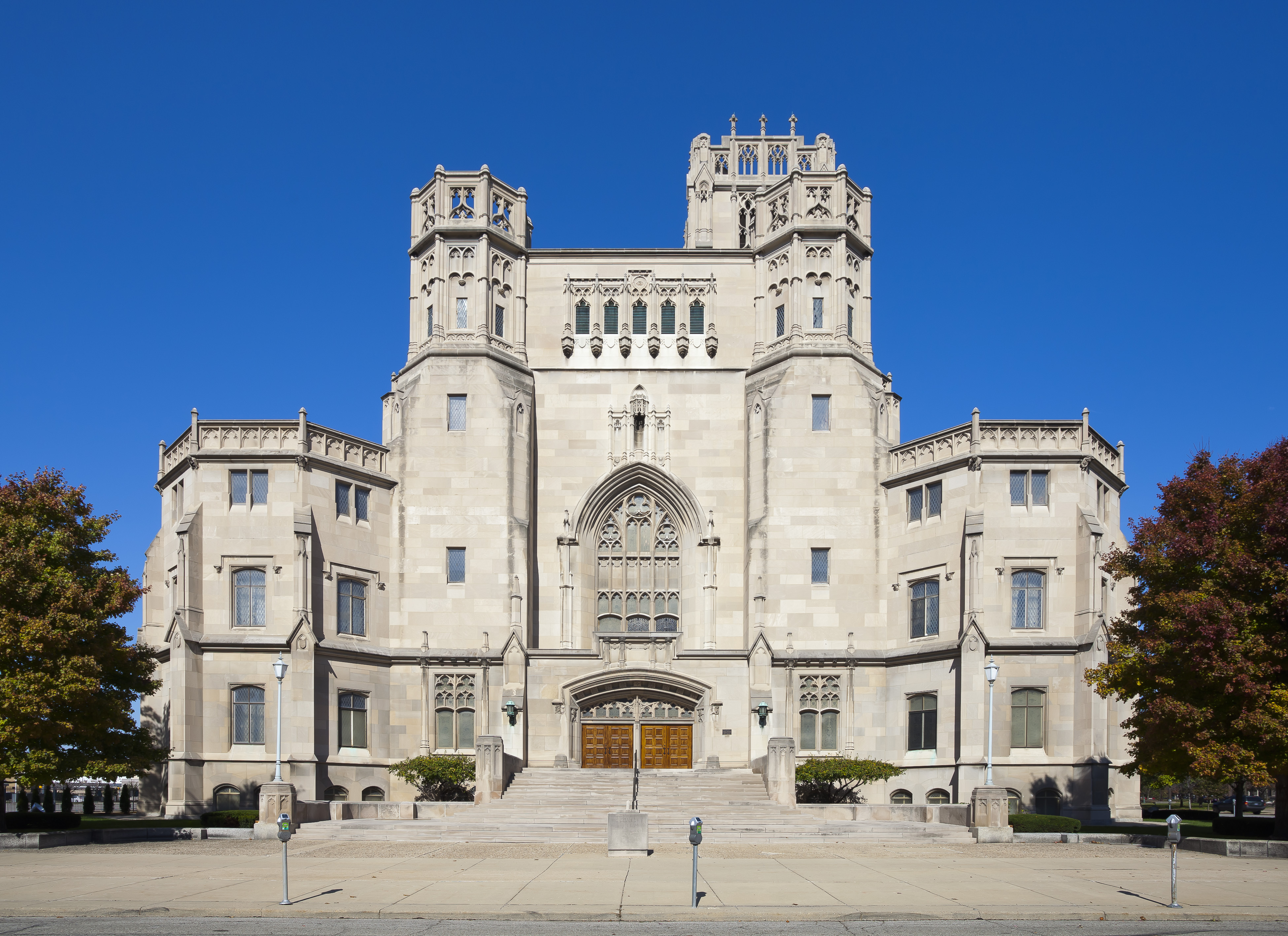
View from south

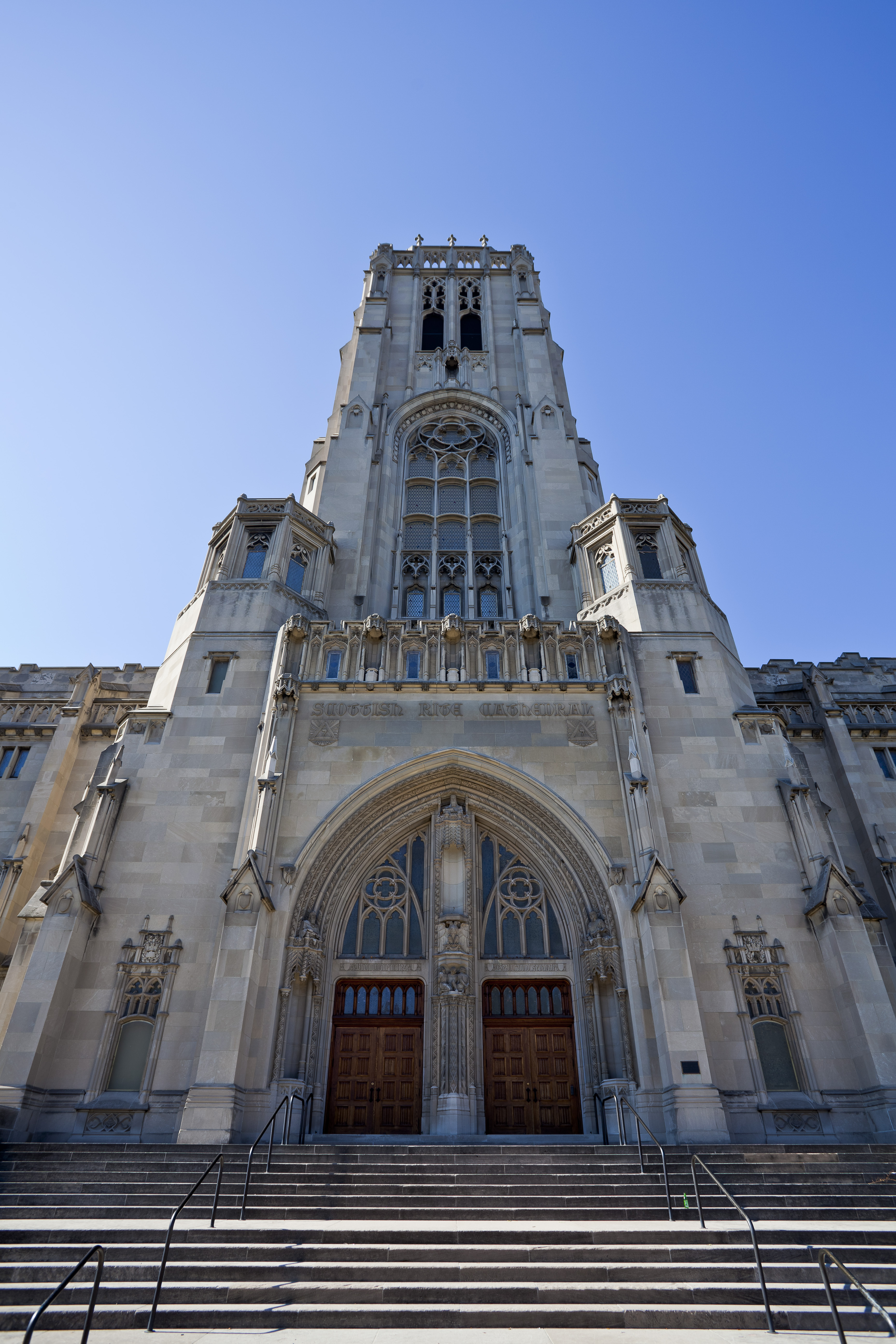
The cathedral from the east

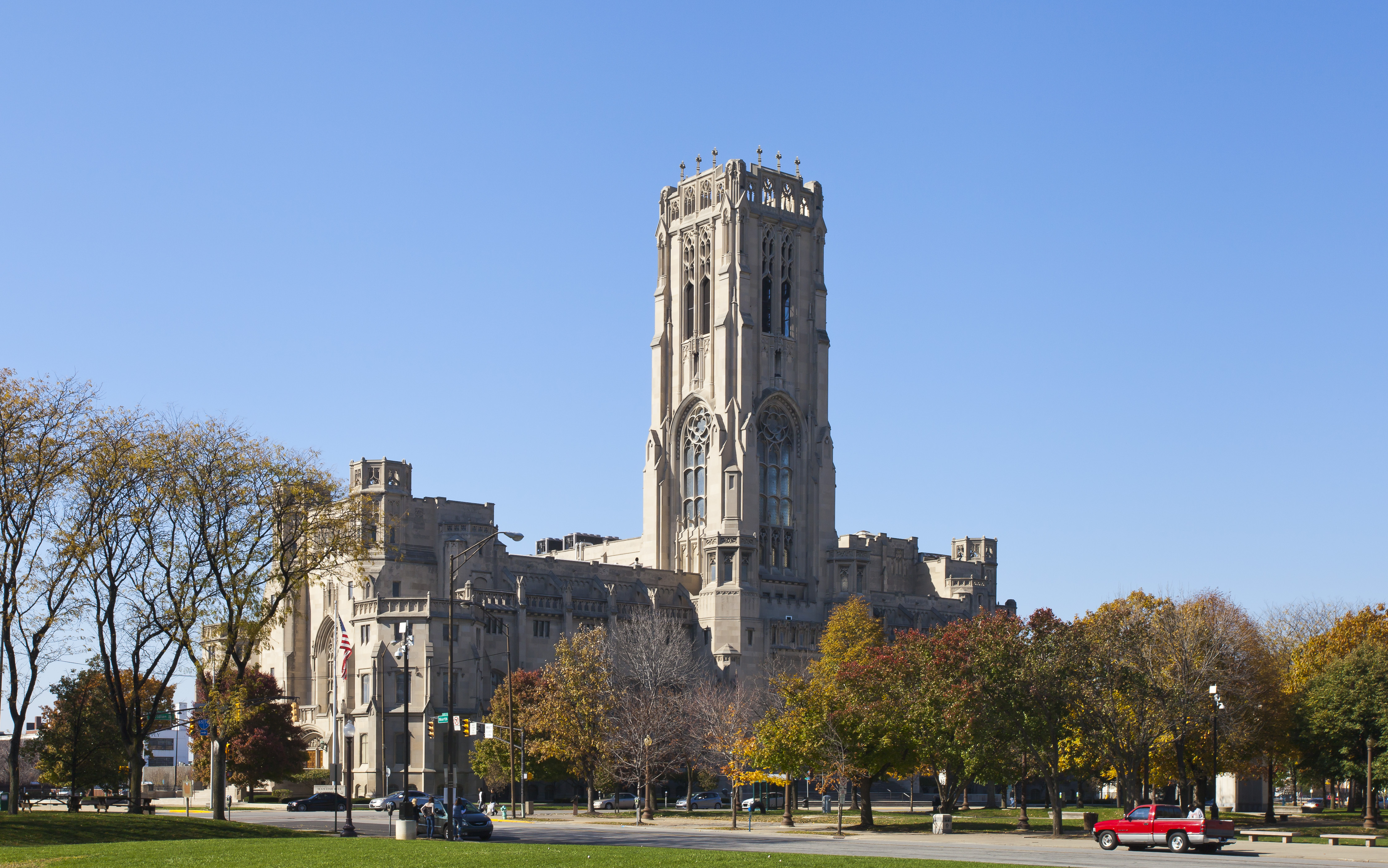
The cathedral from the War Memorial Plaza
