= Charles Cruft (general) =

Union Army General

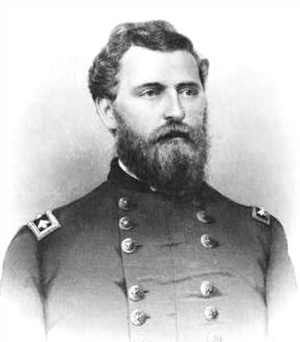
- Charles Cruft
- Born: January 12, 1826; Terre Haute, Indiana
- Died: March 23, 1883 (aged 57); Terre Haute, Indiana
- Burial place: Woodlawn Cemetery, Terre Haute, Indiana
- Military career
- Allegiance: United States of America; Union
- Branch: United States Army; Union Army
- Service years: 1861 –1865
- Rank: Brigadier General; Brevet Major General
- Commands: 31st Indiana Infantry Regiment
- Conflicts: American Civil War; Battle of Fort Donelson (WIA); Battle of Shiloh (WIA); Battle of Richmond (WIA); Battle of Stones River; Battle of Chickamauga; Siege of Chattanooga; Atlanta campaign; Battle of Franklin (1864)

Charles Cruft (January 12, 1826 – March 23, 1883) was a teacher, lawyer, railroad executive, and served as a Union general during the American Civil War.

== Biography ==
Cruft was born in Terre Haute, Indiana. He graduated from Wabash College in 1842. He was employed as a bank clerk, lawyer, president of the St. Louis, Alton, and Terre Haute Railroad (1855–1858), and published Terre Haute's Wabash Express newspaper (1861–1872).

Early in 1861 he and attorney John P. Baird formed a law partnership, which continued until the death of Colonel Baird in 1881. Of this firm it was quoted "That the brilliant genius of Col. Baird as a pleader and court advocate, was equaled only by General Cruft's ability as an advisor and counselor, and to the latter fell all the office details in the innumerable cases in which they acted". The firm held a "very high reputation" throughout the State.

When the Civil War broke out in 1861, Cruft witnessed the First Battle of Bull Run as a civilian. This encouraged him to return to his native Indiana and raised the 31st Indiana Infantry; he was appointed its colonel on September 20, 1861. At the Battle of Fort Donelson, he commanded a brigade in Lew Wallace's division and was wounded during the fighting. He was again wounded, in the head, shoulder, and left thigh, at the Battle of Shiloh while leading his regiment in the Hornet's Nest. He was promoted to brigadier general of volunteers on July 16, 1862. He recovered and commanded a brigade at the Battle of Richmond, Kentucky, where he was again wounded. He commanded a brigade during the Battle of Perryville, but was not engaged in the fighting. He fought at Stones River and Chickamauga. At Chattanooga he commanded the 1st Division, IV Corps, and took part in the fight for Lookout Mountain. He led his division during the Atlanta campaign and commanded a Provisional Division, composed of units from the Army of the Tennessee that could not rejoin William T. Sherman for the March to the Sea, at the Battle of Nashville. On March 7, 1865, President Abraham Lincoln nominated Cruft for appointment to the brevet grade of major general of volunteers, to rank from March 5, 1865, and the U.S. Senate confirmed the award on March 10, 1865. Cruft was mustered out on August 24, 1865.

After the war, he returned to his law practice with his old law partner, Colonel Baird. John Baird was Colonel of the 85th Indiana Volunteer Infantry. In Terre Haute, Cruft befriended businessman Chauncey Rose and aided in the founding of, and was an early manager of, Rose-Hulman Institute of Technology.

Cruft was an active Freemason, a member of Terre Haute Lodge No. 19, F&AM and served as Grand Commander of the Grand Commandery of Indiana, Knights Templar (Freemasonry) in 1873. He died at his home and is buried in Woodlawn Cemetery, Terre Haute.

== See also ==
- List of American Civil War generals (Union)
