= William A. Millis =

American educator and writer

William Alfred Millis (1870/1871–1942) was an American educator and writer. He was a native of Crawfordsville, Indiana.

== Education ==
Millis received an A. B. degree at Indiana University Bloomington in 1889, and an A. M. degree in 1890.

== Career ==
Dr. Millis served on the faculties at Wabash College, Crawfordsville, Indiana, and Indiana University. He was the author of many high school and college textbooks. From 1908 to 1929, he was the eleventh president of Hanover College, Hanover, Indiana.

In 1927, he authored a history of Hanover College on its centennial, History of Hanover College. 1827–1927. A book review in the December 1927 issue of the Indiana Magazine of History, states "The volume, aside from its mere historical value, is a fine commentary on education in Indiana. Dr. Millis writes well, the documents are at his elbow and the result is worthy of the centennial of our oldest living denominational college."

In 1934, he published As I Remember: Autobiography of W.A. Millis, a 98-page volume.

== Death ==
Dr. Millis, husband of Laura Martha Millis, died at his home in Crawfordsville, Indiana, on Saturday night, May 23, 1942, age 72.
