= Thomas A. Hendricks Library =

- U.S. National Register of Historic Places
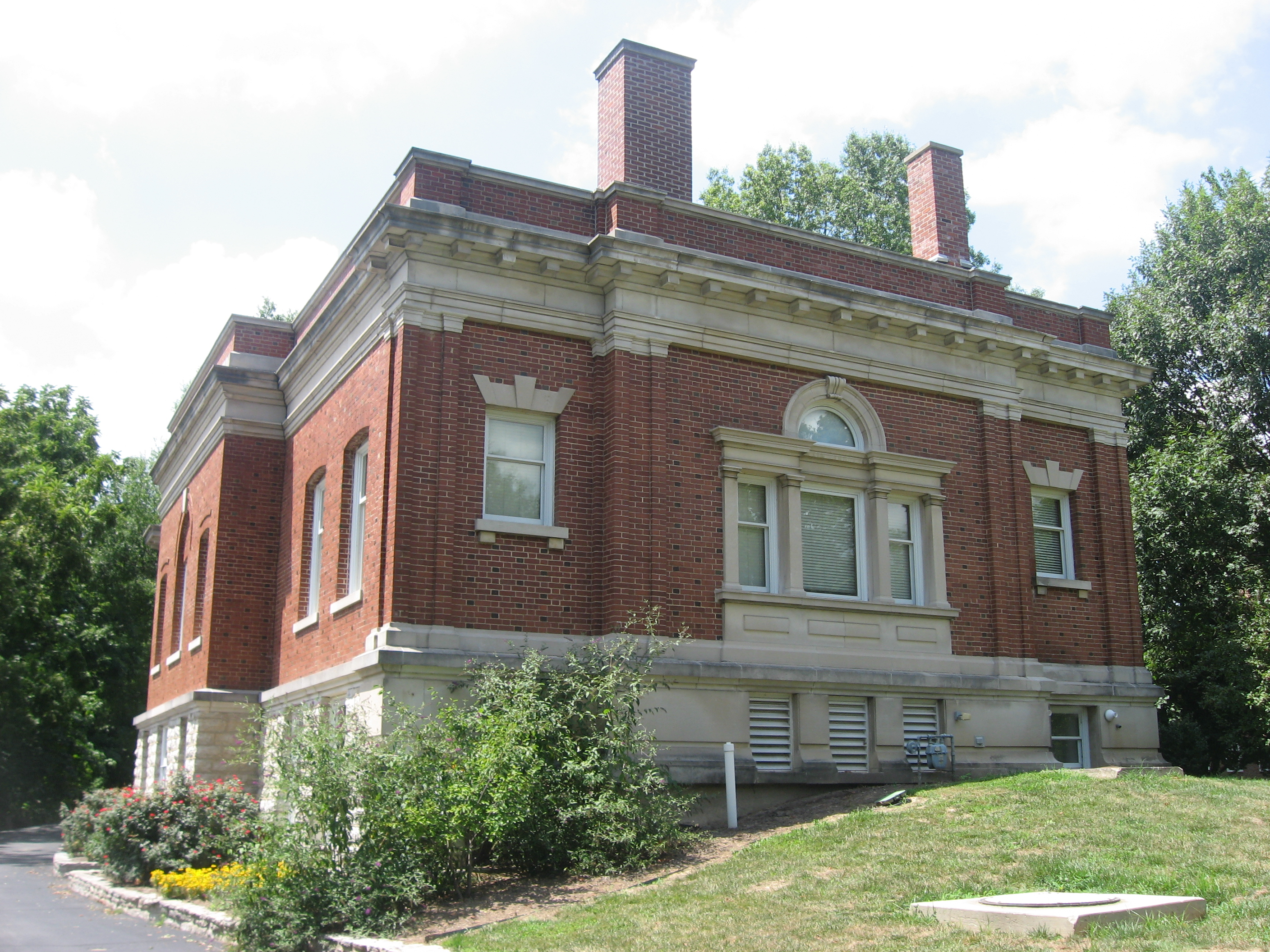
- Hendricks Hall, July 2012

- Location within Indiana Location within the United States
- Location: College Dr. (Campus Rd.) east of Hanover in Hanover Township, Jefferson County, Indiana
- Coordinates: 38°42′45″N 85°27′28″W
- Area: less than one acre
- Built: 1903
- Architect: Patton & Miller
- Architectural style: Colonial Revival
- NRHP reference No.: 82000043
- Added to NRHP: February 26, 1982

Thomas A. Hendricks Library, also known as Hendricks Hall, is a historic library building located on the campus of Hanover College at Hanover Township, Jefferson County, Indiana. It was designed by the architectural firm Patton & Miller and built in 1903. It is a two-story, rectangular, Colonial Revival style brick and limestone building. It measures 48 feet by 75 feet and has a projecting entrance bay with Ionic order stone pilasters. It features a low dome sheathed in copper and Palladian windows. It is named for Hanover College graduate, Indiana governor, and Vice President Thomas A. Hendricks.

It was listed on the National Register of Historic Places in 1982.
