= Crowe-Garritt House =

Historic house in Indiana, United States

- U.S. National Register of Historic Places
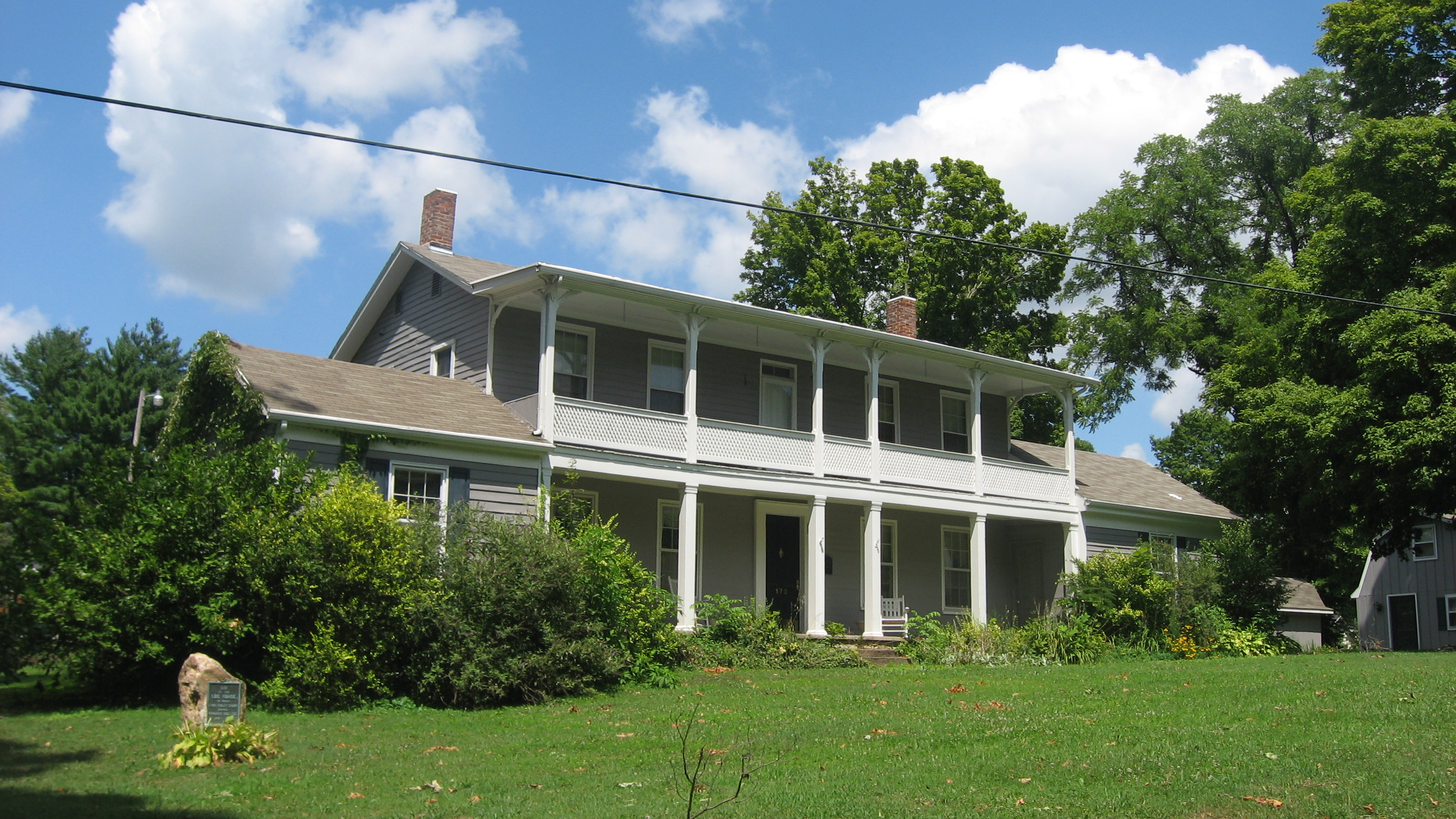
- Crowe-Garritt House, July 2012

- Location within Indiana Location within the United States
- Location: 172 Crowe St., Hanover, Indiana
- Coordinates: 38°42′55″N 85°28′14″W
- Area: 0.7 acres (0.28 ha)
- Built: 1824
- NRHP reference No.: 80000041
- Added to NRHP: November 10, 1980

Crowe-Garritt House is a historic home located at Hanover, Indiana. The original section was built about 1824, with later additions and modifications. It is a two-story, rectangular wood-frame vernacular dwelling with a two-story veranda. The house was the residence of John Finley Crowe, founder of Hanover College from 1824 to 1860.

It was listed on the National Register of Historic Places in 1980.
