= Isaac Kwaku Fokuo =

Ghanaian consultant (born 1976)

Isaac Kwaku Fokuo Jr
- Born: Isaac Kwaku Fokuo Jr; 1976 (age 49–50); Ghana
- Education: Hanover College; University of Chicago; DePaul Driehaus College of Business
- Occupations: Political economy Advisor; Executive
- Years active: 2006–present
- Organization: Amahoro Coalition
- Title: Founder and CEO at Botho Emerging Markets Group and Amahoro Coalition

Isaac Kwaku Fokuo, Jr (born 1976), is a Ghanaian consultant, investor, and philanthropist. Isaac is the founder and CEO at Botho Emerging Markets Group, an investment advisory company, founded in 2006 operates globally with offices in Nairobi, Dubai, and Chicago. Isaac is the founder of the Amahoro Coalition, an African-led initiative that drives multi-sector leadership to advance economic inclusion for displaced populations. Addition to this, between 2013 and 2016, he was the CEO of the African Leadership Network (ALN), a pan-African network of new-generation leaders.

== Biography ==
Isaac was born in 1976 in Ghana. In 1994, he attended Hanover College for his undergraduate degree in the U.S, where he graduated with a Bachelor of Arts in International Relations and Affairs in 1998. Subsequently, Isaac enrolled at University of Chicago in the U.S. to pursue a post-graduate degree, he graduated with a master's degree in international relations and regional security in 1999. Since 2005, Isaac holds a master's degree in business administration from Kellstadt Graduate School of Business.

== Career ==
In 1999, Isaac joined McMaster-Carr Supply Co in the U.S., where he served in various management roles until 2005. In 2013, Isaac was appointed as the CEO at the African Leadership Network (ALN), a pan-African leadership network with the aim of shaping and developing entrepreneurial leaders across Africa, until February 2016. Subsequently, he became vice president at the African Leadership Group, the owner group of ALN, where he was responsible for strategic initiatives, until March 2017.

== Business career ==
In 2006, Isaac founded Botho Emerging Markets Group to assist companies with investment strategies, work with entrepreneurs to fund their projects, and advise local governments on international political and economic issues in the global south. The company has offices in Nairobi, Dubai, and Chicago. Through Botho, Isaac has served as a consultant in various sectors including finance, technology, healthcare, and education across North America, Europe, Africa, Asia, and the Middle East. Sharing his insights on Africa, UAE and China, Isaac featured in several publications including the Arab News, the National, and The East African to mention a few. Since 2020, through Botho, Isaac served as the host of Afro-Catalyst, an online podcast about innovators shaping the future of Africa on the global stage. In 2023, Botho signed an MoU with the African Union aimed at conducting research and knowledge production and seeks to connect and strengthens private sector ties between Africa and the Middle East.

In 2013, Isaac co-founded the Sino-Africa Center of Excellence (SACE), a foundation that aims to promote cooperation between China and Africa by generating insights and adding value in the areas of business development, trade and investments, and entrepreneurship, based in Nairobi, Kenya. In January 2015, SACE launched the Business Perception Index-Kenya which interviewed over 70 Chinese companies operating in Kenya after which they released report outlining the challenges the businesses were facing, the report featured in World Bank annual documents.

== Amahoro Coalition ==
In 2021, Isaac founded the Amahoro Coalition, an African-led NGO convening multi-sector actors across the continent to accelerate private sector leadership in driving sustainable market-based interventions that advance economic inclusion for displaced populations. Between 30 November and 2 December 2021, the Amahoro Coalition in partnership with UNHCR and in collaboration with the Government of Rwanda and Inkomoko, organized the first-ever Africa Private Sector Forum on Forced Displacement titled, "36 Million Solutions", in Kigali, Rwanda.

In 2022, the Amahoro Coalition in partnership with Ajira Digital Program, trained and mentored refugee population in Kenya about using digital platforms, where refugees from Dadaab and Kakuma camps learned to work online and deliver business solutions for the private sector in Kenya.

Since 2023, the Amahoro Coalition with its partners launched the Amahoro Fellowship Program, a 12-month program which gives forcibly displaced persons a platform to cultivate and disseminate their ideas on the world stage. The program also provides funding to the fellows. The Coalition hosted the second edition of the Africa Private Sector Forum on Forced Displacement in Accra, Ghana in November 2023.

== Other considerations ==
During COVID-19 pandemic, Isaac with Marcia Ashong, Ada Osakwe, and Ory Okolloh among others, formed the Africa Unusual Working Group which was working to find practical solutions to the rising COVID-19 cases on the Africa continent. One of the results, the group advised African leaders to lobby for foreign debt relief to deal with the economic and health issues arising from the COVID-19 pandemic.

Isaac is a 2014 ArchBishop Desmond Tutu Fellow. He serves on the board of Ashesi University. He is also a member of the Export-Import Bank of the United States 2023-2024 Advisory Committee and Sub-Saharan Africa Advisory Committee.
