= Hanover Township, Jefferson County, Indiana =

Hanover Township
- Township
- Location in Jefferson County
- Coordinates: 38°42′13″N 85°29′30″W
- Country: United States
- State: Indiana
- County: Jefferson

Government
  - Type: Indiana township

Area
  - Total: 18.95 sq mi (49.1 km^{2})
  - Land: 18.73 sq mi (48.5 km^{2})
  - Water: 0.22 sq mi (0.57 km^{2}) 1.16%
- Elevation: 804 ft (245 m)

Population (2020)
  - Total: 5,592
  - Density: 298.6/sq mi (115.3/km^{2})
- GNIS feature ID: 0453370

Hanover Township is one of ten townships in Jefferson County, Indiana, United States. As of the 2020 census, its population was 5,592 (up from 5,366 at 2010) and it contained 2,030 housing units.

Historical population
Census	Pop.	Note	%±
1890	1,082		—
1900	1,037		−4.2%
1910	1,029		−0.8%
1920	960		−6.7%
1930	978		1.9%
1940	967		−1.1%
1950	1,819		88.1%
1960	2,428		33.5%
1970	3,738		54.0%
1980	5,162		38.1%
1990	4,898		−5.1%
2000	5,409		10.4%
2010	5,366		−0.8%
2020	5,592		4.2%
Source: US Decennial Census

== History ==
Thomas A. Hendricks Library on the campus of Hanover College was listed on the National Register of Historic Places in 1982.

== Geography ==
According to the 2010 census, the township has a total area of 18.95 square miles (49.1 km^{2}), of which 18.73 square miles (48.5 km^{2}) (or 98.84%) is land and 0.22 square miles (0.57 km^{2}) (or 1.16%) is water. The streams of Chain Mill Creek and Happy Valley Creek run through this township.

=== Cities and towns ===
- Hanover

=== Unincorporated towns ===
- Hanover Beach

=== Extinct towns ===
- Antioch Grange

=== Adjacent townships ===
- Madison Township (northeast)
- Saluda Township (south)
- Republican Township (west)

=== Cemeteries ===
The township contains four cemeteries: Carmel, Greenbriar, Hanover and Old Bethel.

=== Major highways ===
- Indiana State Road 56
- Indiana State Road 62
- Indiana State Road 256
- Indiana State Road 356

== Education ==
The school district is Southwestern Jefferson County Consolidated Schools. The comprehensive high school is Southwestern High School.
