= George D. Archibald =

Presbyterian minister, author, and academic (1820–1902)

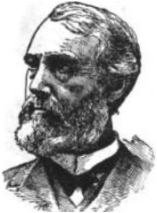
- Born: February 15, 1820; Washington County, Pennsylvania
- Died: September 25, 1902 (aged 82); Covington, Kentucky

Ecclesiastical career
- Offices held: President of Hanover College

George D. Archibald (1820–1902) was a Presbyterian minister, author, and academic.

== Biography ==
George D. Archibald was born in Washington County, Pennsylvania on February 15, 1820. He graduated from Jefferson College in 1847. He was president of Hanover College from 1868 to 1870.

He died at his home in Covington, Kentucky on September 25, 1902.

Academic offices
Preceded by James Wood	President of Hanover College; 1868–1870	Succeeded by George C. Heckman
