= John Finley Crowe =

Presbyterian minister

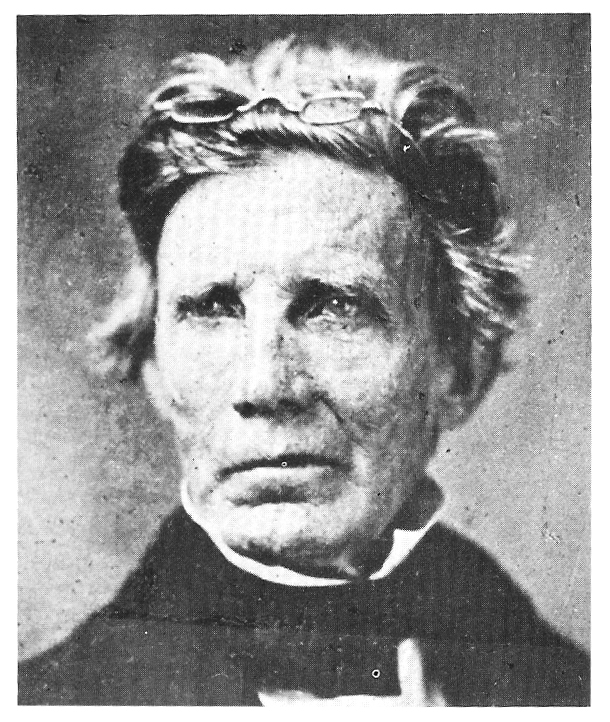
- John Finley Crowe, circa 1850
- Born: June 16, 1787; American frontier (present day Greene County, Tennessee)
- Died: January 17, 1860; Hanover, Indiana
- Education: Transylvania College; Princeton Theological Seminary
- Occupation: Presbyterian Minister
- Spouse: Esther Alexander Crowe

John Finley Crowe (June 16, 1787 - January 17, 1860) was a Presbyterian minister and the founder of Hanover College in Hanover, Indiana.

His residence from 1824 to 1860, the Crowe-Garritt House, was listed on the National Register of Historic Places in 1980.
