= Peter Dunn (author) =

American author, radio host, television personality and speaker

Peter Dunn (born November 29, 1977) is an American financial author, radio host, television personality, and speaker. Author of 60 Days to Change: A Daily How-To Guide with Actionable Tips for Improving Your Financial Life and founder of Advanced Planning Solutions (a financial education firm), Dunn was host of Skills Your Dad Never Taught You on NewsTalk 1430 (WXNT Indianapolis).

== Early life, education and career ==
Dunn was born in Indianapolis, Indiana. By the time he had graduated from Hanover College in 2000, he had his stock broker's license (Series 7). At the age of 20, Dunn started in the financial services industry. He began his financial planning career at MetLife Securities in the summer of 2000. Two years later, he left MetLife Securities to work at AllState Financial Services and opened Advanced Planning Solutions Inc. in 2012. His area of work mainly focused on teaching people the proper money skills (including budgeting, cash flow management, and debt management) that they would need in order to start their financial planning process.

In 2004 Dunn was given the nickname "Pete the Planner", which has become his onscreen persona, and in 2006 Dunn published "What Your Dad Never Taught You About Budgeting." This led to a series of local appearances on WISH-TV (CBS) that included Pete's Money Tips. In May 2008, Dunn created the radio program "Skills Your Dad Never Taught You with Pete the Planner," which airs on 1430 AM WXNT. (The weekly podcast is available on iTunes.) Dunn also regularly appeared on the nationally syndicated radio program Your Time with Kim Iverson.

As a speaker on financial topics, Dunn appears regularly on the Fox Business Network, Fox News’s Studio B with Shepard Smith, and has been a guest host of Abdul in the Morning on WXNT.

Dunn is also the creator of Green Candy, a financial assessment site for Generation Y that aims to help readers avoid the money mistakes of their parents’ generation. Green Candy, which launched in November 2008, led to Dunn's regular appearances on Fox News and Fox Business Network.

Dunn was named one of Indy's Best and Brightest in Media, Entertainment and Sports 2009; and in 2007, he was recognized in the Finance category;

In February 2009 Dunn, along with his business partner Raquel Richardson, created the "60 Days to Change" financial curriculum, which evolved into a news program when WISH-TV (CBS) picked it up as a weekly news series. Dunn and WISH-TV guided three families through the curriculum, and the series was then picked up for distribution by multiple CBS affiliates. Due to the popularity of the program, Dunn was inspired to develop a book. 60 Days to Change: A Daily How-To Guide with Actionable Tips for Improving Your Financial Life was published in November 2009 by Channel V Books.

In December 2009, AOL.com's WalletPop featured Dunn's advice in Secrets of the Credit Score Elite and in Debt Diet Part 6: Holiday meals in a final weekend of shopping. Dan Schawbel of PersonalBrandingBlog.com also featured Dunn in an interview that examined how Dunn created his personal brand and communicates with his audience across a variety of social media.

As a financial expert, Dunn was a regular contributing columnist to MediaPost, where he wrote for the Engage: Gen Y column in 2009–10.

Dunn contributes regularly to Inside INdiana Business, and has also been a guest on Inside INdiana Business with Gerry Dick. Asks dumb questions.

In 2011 Dunn was credited with creating the phrase "the earliest money is the best money." This term describes the power and importance of compounding interest. It means that the money you contribute now is more important than the money you contribute 1 year from now. This is because it will have more time to grow, thus it is the most powerful contribution. Just as last year's contributions are more powerful than this year's contributions.

In 2021, Dunn launched "Hey Money", a financial service advice subscription service.

== Publications ==
- Dunn, Peter (2006) What Your Dad Never Taught You About Budgeting ASIN B00960QB5I
- Dunn, Peter (2009) 60 Days to Change: A Daily How-To Guide with Actionable Tips for Improving Your Financial Life ASIN B00RKQCC1M
