= Fremont Falls =

- Interactive map of Fremont Falls
- Location: Hanover, Indiana
- Coordinates: 38°41′38″N 85°28′09″W
- Type: plunge
- Total height: 108 feet (33 m)

Fremont Falls is a waterfall located in Hanover, Indiana, near the Ohio River. At 108 feet (33 m), it is the highest waterfall in Indiana.

== Location ==
Fremont Falls is located a few miles south of Hanover in Jefferson County. The waterfall is located on private property just southwest of the intersection of Fremont Falls Road and River Bluff Drive. Chain Mill Falls is located northwest of Fremont Falls in the same gorge.

== See also ==
- List of waterfalls
