= St. Stephen's African Methodist Episcopal Church =

Historic church in Indiana, United States

- U.S. National Register of Historic Places
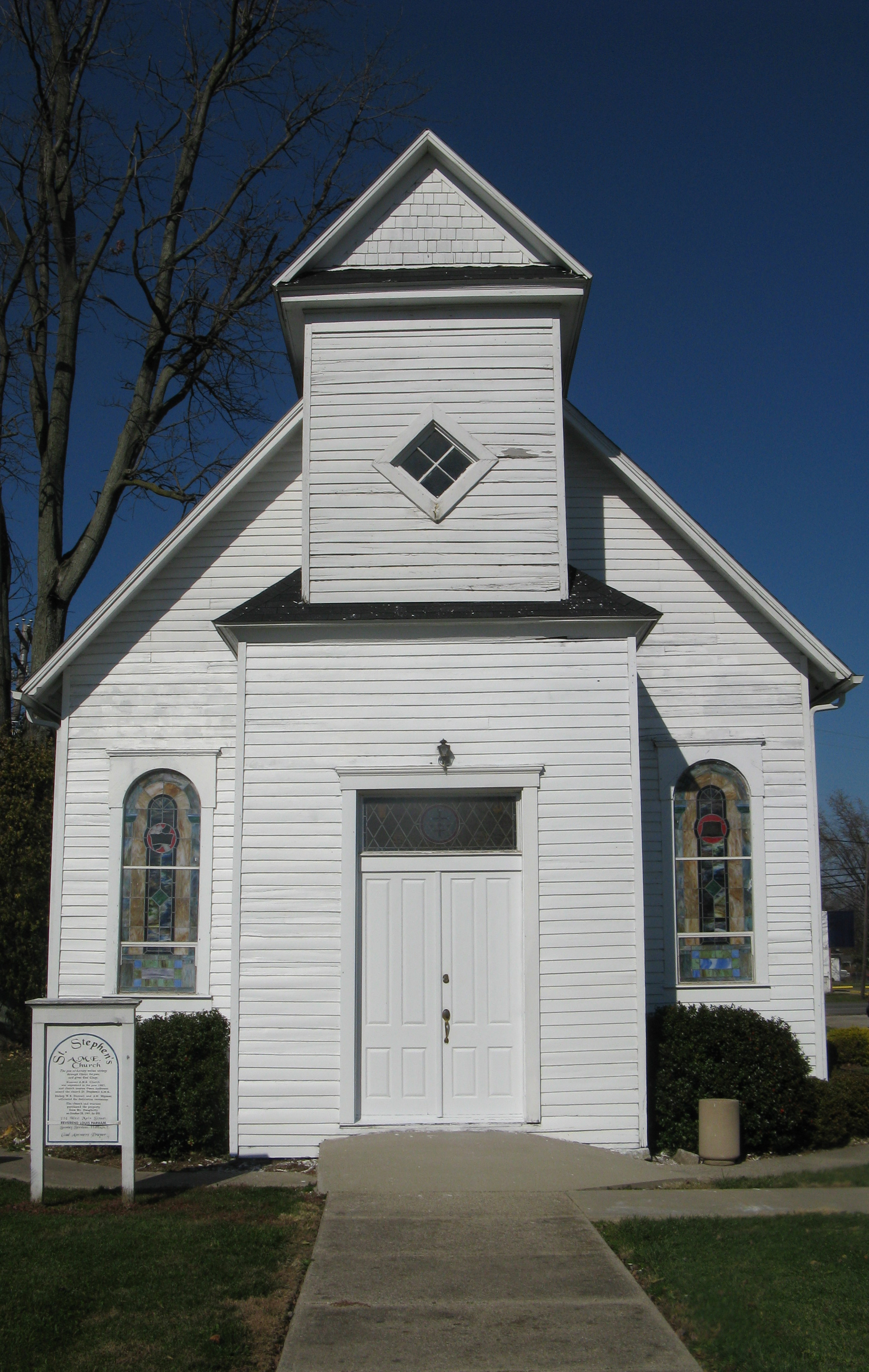
- St. Stephen's African Methodist Episcopal Church, November 2009

- Location within Indiana Location within the United States
- Location: 220 W. Main St., Hanover, Indiana
- Coordinates: 38°42′53″N 85°28′39″W
- Area: less than one acre
- Built: c. 1904
- Architectural style: Queen Anne
- NRHP reference No.: 00001544
- Added to NRHP: December 28, 2000

St. Stephen's African Methodist Episcopal Church is a historic African Methodist Episcopal church located at Hanover, Indiana.

Early records of the church and its founding have been lost, but it is known that the trustees of the church purchased an acre of land in Hanover for $50 in 1892 to build a church. According to oral tradition among the church members, the present building was erected around 1904, using lumber salvaged from the 1834 Graysville Church formerly on Grange Hill Road.

The church is a one-story, rectangular wood-frame building with Queen Anne style design elements. It measures approximately 26 feet wide and 40 feet deep. It has a front gable roof and features a central projecting bell tower and entrance. It was listed on the National Register of Historic Places in 2000.
