= George C. Heckman =

American Presbyterian minister (1825–1902)

The Reverend George C. Heckman D.D., LL.D
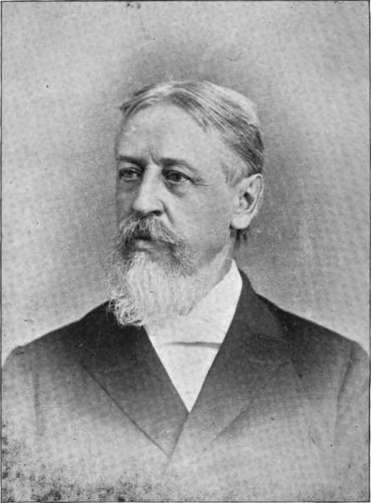
- Born: January 26, 1825; Easton, Pennsylvania, US
- Died: March 5, 1902 (aged 77); Reading, Pennsylvania, US
- Education: Lafayette College; Princeton Theological Seminary
- Occupation: Presbyterian minister
- Ordained: February 8, 1849
- Writings: Dancing as a Christian Amusement, 1879
- Offices held: Hanover College president 1870-1879; Pennsylvania German Society president 1891-1892

Reverend George Creider Heckman D.D., LL.D (January 26, 1825 – March 5, 1902) was a Presbyterian minister and the ninth president of Hanover College serving from 1870 to 1879.

== Early life ==
Heckman was born on January 26, 1825, in Easton, Pennsylvania, to John and Mary Heckman, both of German descent. Heckman first pursued education in the field of ministry while studying at the Easton Classical Academy and later attended Lafayette College at the age of 16, graduating in 1845. After his graduation from Lafayette he attended Princeton Theological Seminary where he graduated in 1848. He was first licensed to preach on August 4, 1846, and was ordained by the Presbytery of Steuben, New York, on February 8, 1849.

== Career ==
Heckman's first eight years as a minister were spent in Port Byron, New York. In January 1857 he responded to a missionary call and preached for four and a half years in both Portage and Janesville, Wisconsin. He then took his preaching to Indianapolis, Indiana, for three years.

During the American Civil War, Heckman was requested by Colonel John H. King to join the 9th Regiment as volunteer chaplain. While in the infantry, Heckman was a sergeant in a company of Indiana minute-men, formed entirely of clergymen, though never called into battle.

Following the war, Heckman returned to the ministry, practicing in Albany, New York. He was requested numerous times over the following years to take on the role as president of Hanover College, and was presented by the college with an honorary Doctor of Divinity in 1868. By 1870 he agreed to take over as president, taking over the presidency at a trying time for the college. During his nine years as president at Hanover, Heckman was known for erecting the President's house, securing $50,000 in funding from alumni contributions, and "laid foundations for the future growth and stability of the institution." Towards the end of his presidency the college came into financial crisis when a bad investment by the school's treasurer greatly reduced the college's income. Heckman, unable to provide for his family at a now reduced salary, resigned as president in 1879.

Heckman continued his pastoral services for the next twelve years in churches in Avondale, Pennsylvania, and Cincinnati, Ohio, and also served as secretary of the Centennial Fund for the church for one year during its centennial in 1888. Upon the conclusion of his duties in this office in 1889 he agreed to take the role as pastor in Reading, Pennsylvania. Here, Heckman was greatly favored, and during the 50th anniversary of his ordainment was given a large celebration put on by the entire town. He was also at this time awarded an honorary Legum Doctor degree, again by Hanover College, in 1890. During his tenure in Reading he attempted to retire twice but both times he was persuaded against this decision. An agreement was reached in 1901 to allow Heckman to retire, but stay on with the church as a Pastor Emeritus.

== Personal life ==
On June 11, 1850, Heckman married Josephine A. Davis, and together they had eight children. He was a long time member of the Sons of the American Revolution and president from 1891 to 1892 of the Pennsylvania German Society. He also served as a trustee on the boards of both Hanover and Lafayette College, and gave an address at the semi-centennial commencement of Lafayette College in 1882.

He also published a book Dancing as a Christian Amusement in 1879.

Heckman died in Reading, Pennsylvania, on March 5, 1902, from heart failure.

Academic offices
Preceded by George D. Archibald	President of Hanover College; 1870–1879	Succeeded by Daniel Webster Fisher
