= Chris Culver =

American novelist

- Born: Tulsa, Oklahoma, U.S.
- Occupation: Novelist
- Writing career
- Genres: Hardboiled crime fiction, thriller
- Website: www.indiecrime.com

Chris Culver is an American author of crime fiction. Set in and around the Midwestern United States, his novels include the twelve-book Joe Court series and the seven-novel Ash Rashid series, the first volume of which remained on The New York Times bestseller list for 16 weeks. He has since written several standalone novels in the crime and thriller genre.

== Biography ==
Culver was born in Tulsa, Oklahoma in September 1981. His family moved to Chickasha, Oklahoma shortly thereafter, later relocating to Newburgh, Indiana in 1988. An avid reader in elementary school, he developed an interest in crime fiction writing after acquiring a copy of Mickey Spillane's I, the Jury in a library book sale.

Culver enrolled at Hanover College in 2000, graduating from there with a bachelor's degree in philosophy in 2004. After marrying a fellow Hanover College graduate, he enrolled in law school. He subsequently enrolled in a philosophy doctoral program at Purdue University, where he also taught undergraduate students as a graduate assistant.

== Novels ==
Title	Original publication date	Series
The Abbey	2011, March	Ash Rashid, Book 1
Just Run	2011, September	—N/a
The Outsider	2013, April	Ash Rashid, Book 2
By Any Means	2014, May	Ash Rashid, Book 3
Nine Years Gone	2014, June	—N/a
Measureless Night	2015, May	Ash Rashid, Book 4
Pocketful of God	2016, January	Ash Rashid, Book 5
No Room for Good Men	2017, January	Ash Rashid, Book 6
Counting Room	2017, September	Gabe Ward, Book 1
Sleeper Cell	2018, March	Ash Rashid, Book 7
The Girl in the Motel	2018, December	Joe Court, Book 1
The Girl in the Woods	2019, February	Joe Court, Book 2
The Boys in the Church	2019, April	Joe Court, Book 3
The Man in the Meth Lab	2019, July	Joe Court, Book 4
The Woman Who Wore Roses	2019, September	Joe Court, Book 5
The Man in the Park	2019, December	Joe Court, Book 6
The Girl Who Told Stories	2020, March	Joe Court, Book 7
The Men on the Farm	2020, June	Joe Court, Book 8
The Man in the River	2020, September	Joe Court, Book 9
Night Work	2021, August	Hannah Blackwood, Book 1
The Lost Ones	2021, November	Hannah Blackwood, Book 2
Throwaways	2022, February	Hannah Blackwood, Book 3
Those Who Remain	2022, June	Homer Watson, Book 1
Where I Die	2022, November	Homer Watson, Book 2
The Man by the Creek	2023, July	Joe Court, Book 10
The Girl in the Tent	2024, April	Joe Court, Book 11
The Man in the Fire	2025, September	Joe Court, Book 12
