= Hanover Beach, Indiana =

- Unincorporated community
- Location within Indiana Location within the United States
- Coordinates: 38°42′24″N 85°27′12″W
- Country: United States
- State: Indiana
- County: Jefferson
- Township: Hanover
- Elevation: 430 ft (130 m)
- ZIP code: 47243
- FIPS code: 18-31288
- GNIS feature ID: 452049

Hanover Beach is an unincorporated community in Hanover Township, Jefferson County, Indiana.

Hanover Beach is a riverfront community near Hanover, Indiana, hence the name.
