= Marlene Mhangami =

African Developer Advocate

- Born: Harare, Zimbabwe
- Citizenship: London
- Occupation: Developer Advocate Software Engineer
- Known for: Developer Advocacy
- Website: https://marlenemhangami.com

Marlene Mhangami is a Zimbabwean developer advocate and software engineer. She is the director and Vice Chair of the Association for Computing Machinery's (ACM) Practitioner Board, which is responsible for developing programs that support the professional needs of ACM members as well as promoting computing as a profession.

== Early life and education ==
Mhangami grew up in Harare, Zimbabwe. In an interview with ACM about her first experiences with technology, she states:

'I have always been interested in technology and the impact it had on the world but growing up[,] I didn't really have anyone to introduce me to the concept of coding. We had one computer that we shared in my house, and my brothers were super into gaming. They were on it all the time. In high school, I took a computer class. But my teachers, who I’m sure were really nice people, didn’t go much further than the basics of using Microsoft Office and having us memorize the names of different parts of hardware. So, in general, I focused more on life and physical sciences...'.

After graduating high school, Mhangami moved to the United States where she attended Hanover College to pursue a Bachelor of Science degree in molecular biology. During her time at the college, Mhangami slowly rediscovered her love for coding and tech. So during one summer break, Mhangami decided to organize a meetup to connect with other aspiring developers. During the event, she was introduced to Ronald Maravanyika, where he taught her how to code in Python. After graduating from Hanover, Mhangami enrolled herself at University of London and obtained her Bachelor's degree in computer science.

== Career ==
Mhangami started her tech career in 2017 with starting Zimbopy with Ronald Maravanykia, a nonprofit organization that is dedicated to helping Zimbabwean women break into tech. In 2019, she organized the first PyCon in Africa. In 2020, she became as a software engineer at NVIDA, and from 2021-2024, she became a developer advocate at Voltron Data. Mhangami is now a Senior Developer Advocate at Microsoft where she specializes in Python and Artificial Intelligence.

== Notable achievements ==
In 2017, Mhangami became first African woman to [join] the board at the Python Software Foundation. In an interview with Ricky White from Real Python about this achievement, Mhangami recalls:

"At that time, no one from Africa had ever held a seat...I remember looking through the list of the nominees and thinking that I didn’t belong there. I had done some work with the local Python community in Zimbabwe, but I felt really intimidated by everyone’s profiles. I ended up agreeing to let Lorena[Mesa] nominate me, mainly because I had nothing to lose, haha! Surprisingly, I was voted in, which I think is purely a testament to the Python community’s commitment to diversity and global representation."

== Publications ==
- Meluso, J., Chambers, C., Littauer, R., Llamas, N., Lingo, E.L., Mhangami, M., Pitt, B., Splitter, V., and Wang, H., 2026. Open practices across science, software, education and other domains. Nature Human Behaviour, p. 1-13.

== See also ==
- Python Software Foundation
- Software Engineering
