= Halbert Hains Britan =

American philosopher (1874–1945)

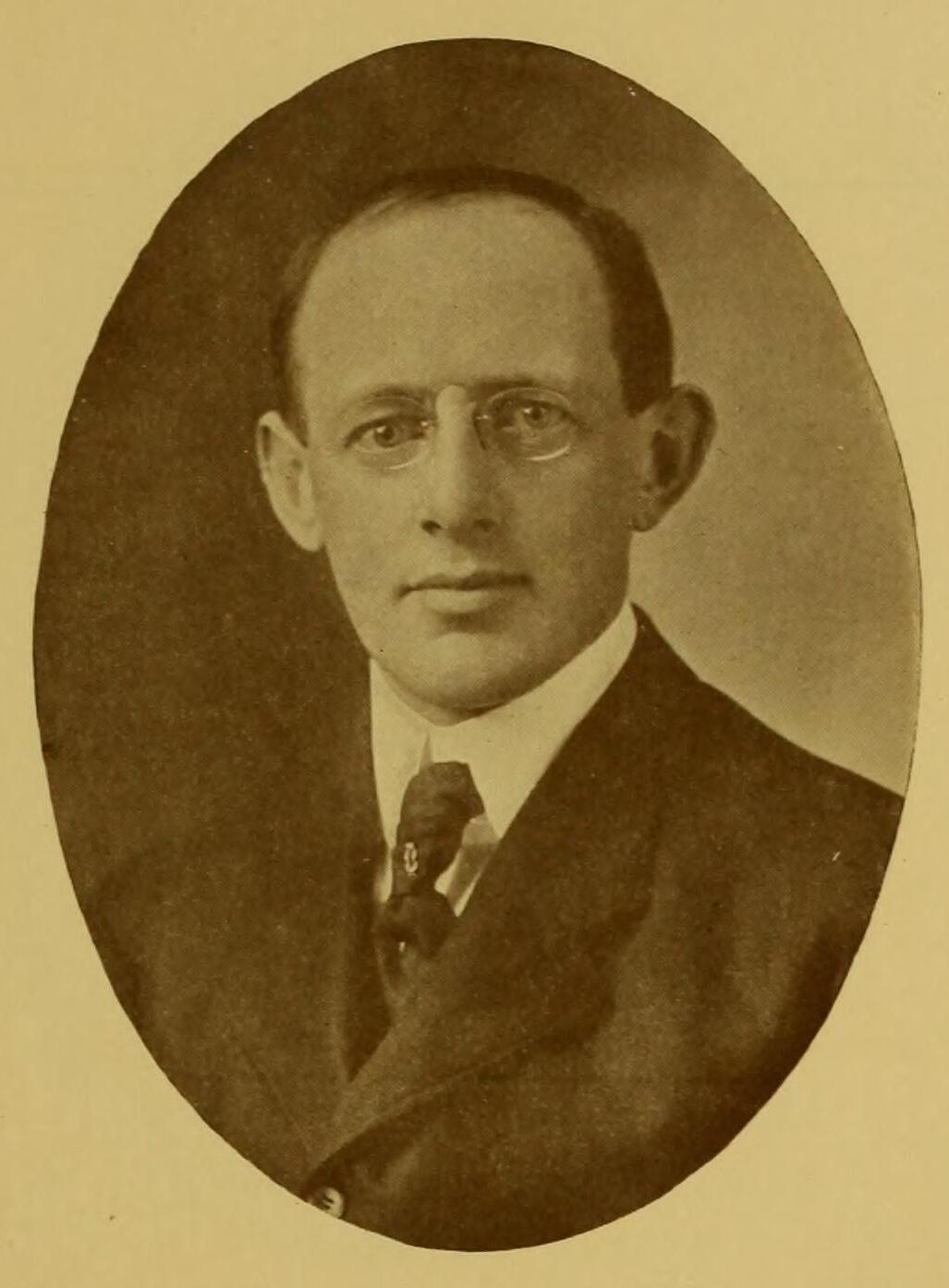
Halbert Hains Britan circa 1910

Halbert Hains Britan (October 8, 1874 – August 5, 1945) was an American philosopher.

Halbert Hains Britan was born on October 8, 1874, in Bethlehem, Indiana. He received a Bachelor of Arts from Hanover College in 1898 and a doctorate in philosophy from Yale University in 1902. His dissertation was titled Ethics and Aesthetics: Their Relation in Pre-Kantian Philosophy.

Beginning in 1905, Britan taught philosophy at Bates College. He retired in 1942.

His first published work was a translation of Baruch Spinoza's Principia philosophiae cartesianae from Latin.

On February 11, 1921, Britan gave a lecture titled "On Falling in Love" at Bates. The lecture was published in the Lewiston Evening Journal, reprinted in The Boston Globe, and then reprinted widely in other newspapers across the United States.

He died on August 5, 1945, in Lewiston, Maine.

== Works ==
=== Books ===
- The Philosophy of Music: A Comparative Investigation into the Principles of Musical Aesthetics (New York: Longmans, Green, & Co, 1911)
- The Affective Consciousness (New York: Macmillan, 1931)

=== Journal articles ===
- "Music and Morality". International Journal of Ethics. 15 (1): 48–63. 1904. doi:10.1086/intejethi.15.1.2375826. ISSN 1526-422X. JSTOR 2375826.
- "The Power of Music". The Journal of Philosophy. 5 (13): 352–357. 1908. doi:10.2307/2011756. ISSN 0160-9335. JSTOR 2011756.
