= Ada Osakwe =

Nigerian economist, entrepreneur, and executive

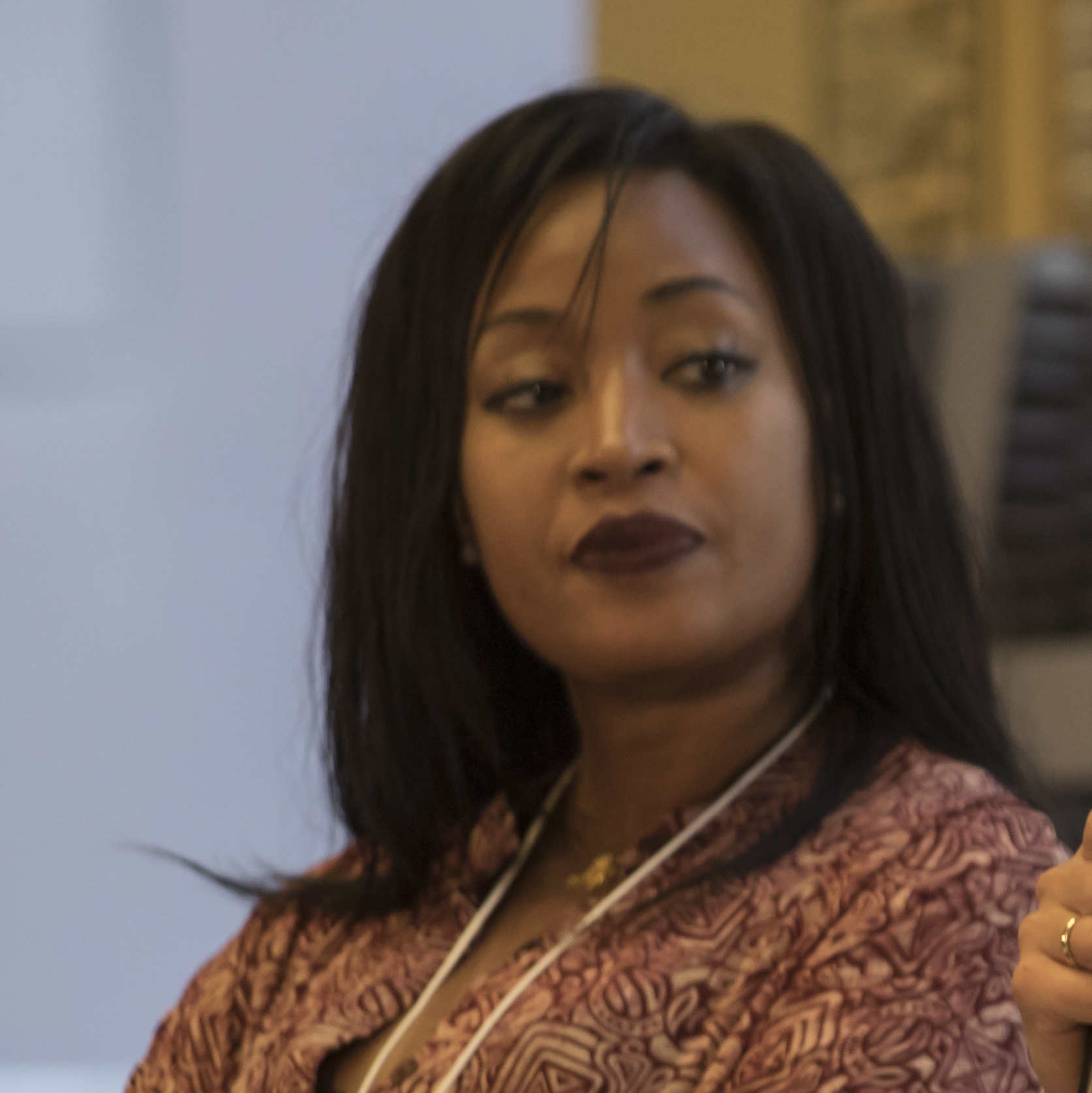
- Osakwe in 2018
- Born: 2 September 1981 (age 45); Nigeria
- Education: University of Hull; University of Warwick; Kellogg School of Management
- Occupation: Business executive
- Years active: 1990–present
- Title: CEO of Agrolay Ventures

Ada Osakwe (born 2 September 1981) is a Nigerian economist, entrepreneur, and corporate executive, who is the founder and chief executive officer of Agrolay Ventures, an agribusiness investment company based in Nigeria, which invests in African agricultural food-related companies. She is also the founder of Nuli Foods and Nuli Juice company. From November 2012 until May 2015, Osakwe was the senior investment adviser to Nigeria's Minister of Agriculture and Rural Development, Akinwumi Adesina.

== Background and education ==
Ada Osakwe was born in Nigeria on 2 September 1981. She attended secondary school in Lagos for her A-Level education, and graduated from the University of Hull, in the United Kingdom, with a Bachelor of Science in Economics. Her Master of Science in Economics and Finance was obtained from the University of Warwick, also in the UK. She also holds a Master of Business Administration, obtained from the Kellogg School of Management, at Northwestern University, in Evanston, Illinois in the United States.

== Career ==
Osakwe first worked as an investment banker with BNP Paribas at their London office. She then worked as a senior investment officer at the African Development Bank (AfDB), mainly in the area of infrastructure finance, serving in that capacity for four years. She was based in Tunis. Later, she served as vice-president at Kuramo Capital Management, a private equity company based in New York City.

After her work with the Nigerian Ministry of Agriculture, Osakwe founded Agrolay Ventures. She also founded Nuli Juice, a restaurant chain in Nigeria. In 2017, she was appointed to the board of One Acre Fund, a Kenya-based financial and educational non-government organisation that serves small-scale farmers in Burundi, Kenya, Malawi, Rwanda, Tanzania and Uganda.

== Awards and recognition ==
In December 2014, Osakwe was named among the "Twenty Youngest Power Women in Africa 2014" by Forbes Magazine.

In March 2021, she was given the Business Woman Award by Forbes Magazine.

Osakwe was named one of the "15 African Female Founders You Should Know in 2023" by African Folder in March 2023.
