= Hanover College =

Private college in Hanover, Indiana, US

- Seal: Philosophia pietati ancillans (Latin) "Knowledge in service of piety"
- Former name: Hanover Academy (1827–1833)
- Type: Private college
- Established: January 1, 1827; 199 years ago
- Religious affiliation: Presbyterian Church (USA)
- Endowment: $167.2 million (2025)
- President: Lake Lambert III
- Faculty: 89 Full-time & 7 part-time
- Undergraduates: 1,070
- Location: Hanover, Indiana, U.S. 38°42′44″N 85°27′39″W
- Campus: Rural 650 acres (260 ha)
- Colors: Red and blue
- Nickname: Panthers
- Sporting affiliations: NCAA Division III, Heartland Collegiate Athletic Conference
- Mascot: Panther
- Website: hanover.edu
- ^{a} U.S. News: 2017 Best Colleges Rankings^{b} "About Hanover College" as of Feb 2017

Hanover College is a private college in Hanover, Indiana, United States, affiliated with the Presbyterian Church (USA). Founded in 1827 by Reverend John Finley Crowe, it is Indiana's oldest private college. The Hanover athletic teams participate in the NCAA Division III as a member of the Heartland Collegiate Athletic Conference. Alumni are known as Hanoverians.

== History ==
=== Founding ===
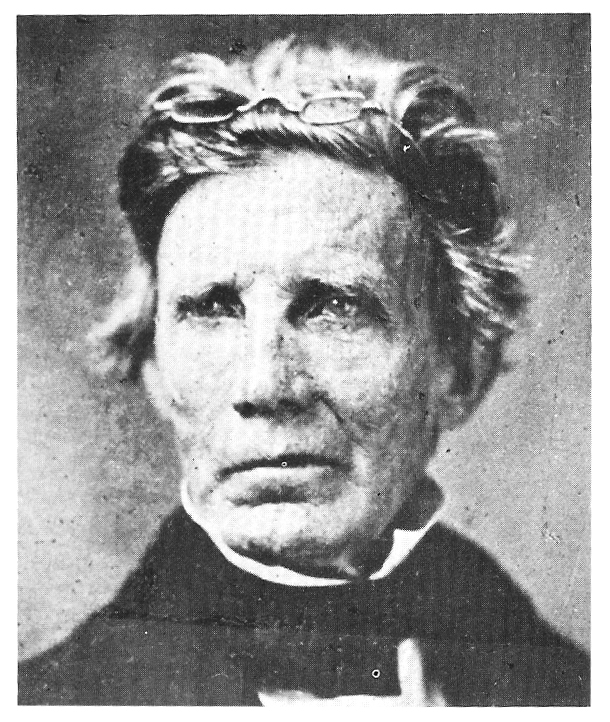
Founder John Finley Crowe

In the early 19th century, missionaries went to Hanover as part of the Second Great Awakening. Crowe served as pastor of the Hanover Presbyterian Church. He opened the Hanover Academy on January 1, 1827, in a small log cabin near his home. Two years later, the state of Indiana granted the academy a charter. On November 9, 1829, the academy's board of trustees accepted the Presbyterian Synod of Indiana's proposal to adopt the school, provided a theological department was established.

A two-story brick building was constructed to house both the academy and the new Indiana Seminary. The state of Indiana issued the academy a new charter, creating Hanover College effective January 1, 1833. Under this charter, the college's board of trustees is independent of ecclesiastical control, but it has formally adopted the standards for Presbyterian colleges for Hanover. The association continues to this day.

In the 1830s, the College Edifice (now serving as the Hanover Presbyterian Church) was the center of a 3-acre (12,000 m^{2}) campus. In 1834, 119 students attended Hanover Preparatory School (formerly Hanover Academy) and 101 students attended Hanover College, rapid growth from the six students of seven years earlier.

In 1843 the college's president and its trustees accepted a proposal from Madison city leaders to move Hanover College. The trustees dissolved the Hanover charter and established Madison University five miles east. But Crowe purchased the college property and established the Hanover Classical and Mathematical School. Four months after Madison University was founded, its president had resigned while its students began to return to Crowe's school. By May 1844, all of Madison's students and faculty had made the trip.

Hanover College was officially restored when Indiana's legislature granted the college a new charter on Christmas Day. Crowe, who served as college faculty for more than 30 years and refused to have his name considered for the presidency, is described as "twice the founder of Hanover College."

In 1849 the board of trustees voted to purchase a 200-acre (0.8 km^{2}) farm one-half mile east of Hanover's campus. By the mid-1850s, Classic Hall was constructed on a bluff known as the Point, and College classes were moved to that location. "Old Classic" would be Hanover's signature building for more than 90 years.

During the Civil War, the Confederate offensive maneuvers of Morgan's Raid came close to campus; faculty and students were alerted that the troops might try to burn Classic Hall.

In 1870, Presbyterian Church officials proposed that Hanover College be merged with Wabash College, with Hanover becoming a women's school. The Hanover board of trustees rejected that proposal, as well as one from businessmen in 1873 that would have moved the college to Indianapolis and renamed it Johnson University.

In 1880, Hanover began enrolling women.

=== 20th century ===
- Thomas A. Hendricks Library; Hendricks Hall
- U.S. National Register of Historic Places
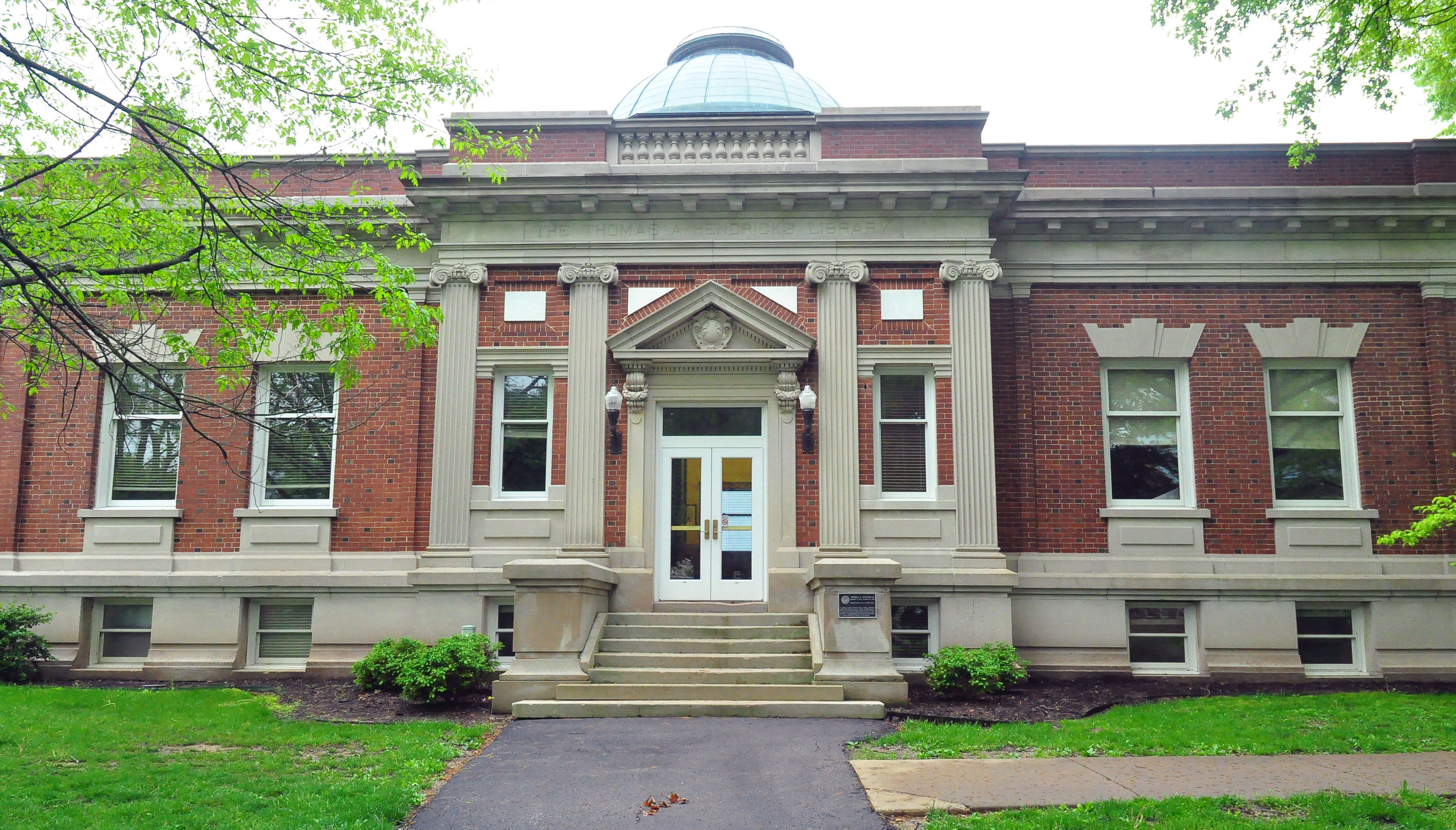
- Hendricks Hall front entrance
- Area: < 1 acre (0.40 ha)
- Built: 1903
- Architect: Patton & Miller
- Architectural style: Colonial Revival
- NRHP reference No.: 82000043
- Added to NRHP: February 26, 1982

During Hanover College's first 50 years of operations, it had nine presidents, none of whom served for longer than nine years; five served three years or less. But after that, conditions stabilized. Daniel Fisher led Hanover from 1879 until his retirement in 1907. This stability of leadership ushered in a new era of growth. Fisher oversaw the construction of five buildings, including Thomas A. Hendricks Library (now Hendricks Hall). Named for Thomas Hendricks, an alumnus and former U.S. vice president, it is now used for offices and known as Hendricks Hall, the oldest classroom building on Hanover's campus.

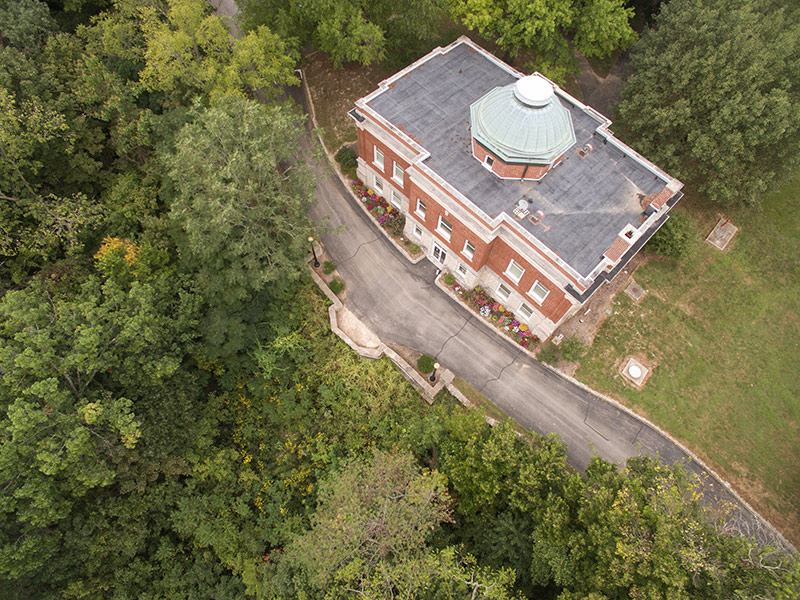
Aerial view of Hendricks Hall

Albert G. Parker Jr. was inaugurated as Hanover's 12th president November 27, 1929, less than one month after the stock market crash that precipitated the Great Depression. The economic hard times cut investment revenues and operational expenses had to be closely monitored.

On December 7, 1941, the attack on Pearl Harbor plunged the United States into World War II. In just two years, Hanover's enrollment plummeted to 164 students, including only 20 men. In the early morning of December 19, 1941, a huge fire destroyed most of Classic Hall. By 1946, the postwar enrollment at Hanover was 679 students.

In 1947 Long College for Women was founded as a coordinate college. Until the 1960s, all women who graduated from Hanover had their degree officially conferred by Long instead of Hanover. Long College operated until the two colleges fully merged in 1978, making Hanover officially co-ed.

Parker had announced that he would retire as Hanover's president as of September 1, 1958, but died in March of that year. John E. Horner was named as an interim president and ended up serving 29 years. Hanover students say that Parker's ghost still haunts Parker auditorium.

Under Horner's 29-year leadership, Hanover enjoyed unprecedented growth in its academic program, financial standing, and student enrollment. Soon after his arrival, he encouraged faculty members to reform their curriculum. Eventually Hanover divided its academic year into two 14-week terms, in which students took three classes, and a five-week Spring Term, in which students took one course of specialized, intensive study. With some modifications, it still serves as Hanover's curricular model today. Spring, or May, Term is a one-month period where students engage in intensive study, often with a focus on travel or unique on-campus courses. Many courses involve study abroad.

By the mid-1960s, the campus expanded to more than 500 acres (2 km^{2}) of land, enrollment topped 1,000 students, and Hanover's assets approached $15 million.

In the late afternoon of April 3, 1974, the campus was devastated by a tornado, part of the 1974 Super Outbreak of tornadoes that struck 13 states and one Canadian province that day. No one was killed or seriously injured, but 32 of the college's 33 buildings were damaged, including two that were completely destroyed and six that sustained major structural damage. One of the completely destroyed buildings was a residence hall which had previously, back in 1890, served as the first fraternity house in the entire Sigma Chi Fraternity. Hundreds of trees were down, completely blocking every campus road. All utilities were knocked out and communication with those off campus was nearly impossible.

Government officials estimated the damage at $10 million. Some wondered if Hanover College could survive. The Hanoverians, led by Horner, sprang into action. Winter term ended one week early and students were dismissed, but many stayed to help faculty, staff and others clear the debris. The board of trustees met on April 5 in an emergency session and vowed to lead the efforts in rebuilding and improving Hanover College. They vowed to do so without any federal disaster assistance, continuing Hanover's tradition of financial independence.

Within a week, roads were made passable and major services restored. Contributions poured in to cover Hanover's $1 million in uninsurable losses; they raised this amount in three months. When Spring Term opened April 22, the college had full enrollment 19 days after the tornado. An editorial in The Indianapolis Star described the effort as "a private miracle." By spring 1975, replanting efforts completed Hanover's recovery.

When Horner retired in 1987, Hanover's endowment was more than $40 million. Russell Nichols was inaugurated as Hanover's 14th president on September 26, 1987. He initiated actions to improve the Hanover experience for students both inside and outside the classroom. The number of full-time faculty was increased over a five-year period from 72 to 94, lowering the student-teacher ratio and allowing for more independent research and study. Six new academic majors were added.

In terms of amenities, students enjoyed a direct-dial telephone in each dorm room, ending years of having a campus operator direct all calls. More significantly, academic scholarships were increased for incoming and returning students.

In 1995 the $11 million Horner Health and Recreation Center was opened; it was named for the president emeritus and his wife.

=== 21st century ===
In 2000, a $23 million Science Center was dedicated, which now houses all of the college's natural sciences in the same facility.

In May 2006, Nichols announced his plans to retire at the conclusion of the 2007 academic year. His accomplishments include the revision of the curriculum which expanded study abroad offerings. Additionally, he oversaw implementation of the Center for Business Preparation, an innovative program designed to link liberal arts education with business. In 2004, Hanover was awarded $11.4 million to start the Rivers Institute, a multi-disciplinary center to study all aspects of rivers throughout the world.

In the fall of 2007, Sue DeWine, former provost at Marietta College in Ohio, succeeded Nichols as Hanover's 15th president. DeWine was succeeded by Lake Lambert in 2015.

=== Presidents ===
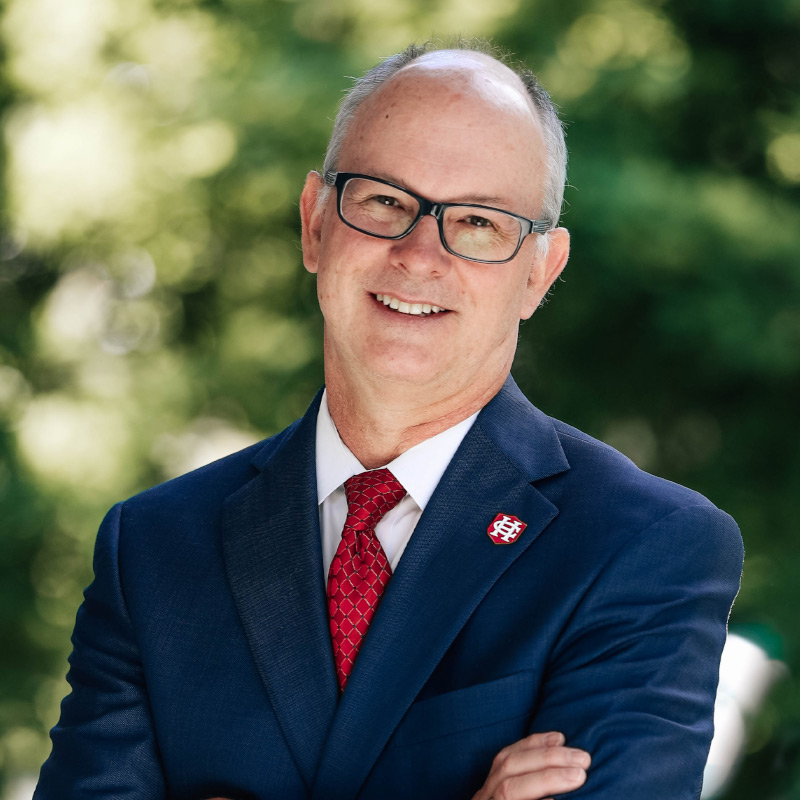
Lake Lambert, the college's current president

1. James Blythe, 1832–1836
2. Duncan McAuley, March – July 1838
3. Erasmus D. MacMaster, 1838–1843
4. Sylvester Scovel, 1846–1849
5. Thomas E. Thomas, 1849–1854
6. Jonathan Edwards, 1855–1857
7. James Wood, 1859–1866
8. George D. Archibald, 1868–1870
9. George C. Heckman, 1870–1879
10. Daniel Webster Fisher, 1879–1907
11. William A. Millis, 1908–1929
12. Albert Parker, 1929–1958
13. John Horner, 1958–1987
14. Russell Nichols, 1987–2007
15. Sue DeWine, 2007–2015
16. Lake Lambert, 2015–present

== Campus ==
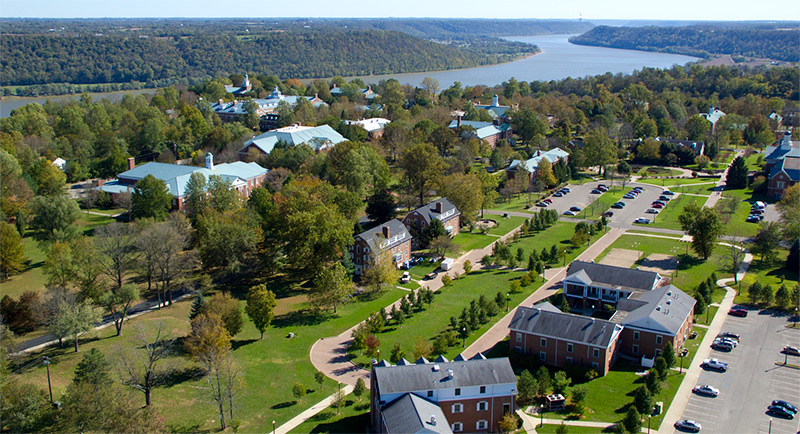
Hanover College's campus overlooking the Ohio River

Hanover College is situated on 650 acres (2.6 km^{2}) of land overlooking the Ohio River. The land features several climbing paths and cliffs, as well as the only view of the Ohio from which three bends in the river can be seen. The campus is characterized by the Georgian style architecture. The quad features the Parker Auditorium, named for the former Hanover College president, Albert Parker.

In the 1940s the college turned down plans to rebuild the Sigma Chi fraternity house as designed by Frank Lloyd Wright, because it did not match the Georgian Architecture.

Much of the campus was heavily damaged in the April 3, 1974, tornado Super Outbreak, including several buildings that were destroyed. Damage to 32 of the 33 buildings totaled over $10 million. The campus lost hundreds of mature trees.

== Academics ==
Hanover College offers a robust liberal-arts curriculum centered around exploration and intellectual growth. The college provides nearly 40 undergraduate majors encompassing traditional disciplines such as Anthropology, Biochemistry, Computer Science, English, Mathematics, Music, Political Science, Psychology, and Theatre, as well as interdisciplinary fields like Data Science and Medieval‑Renaissance Studies. Students may also design their own major.

=== Pre‑professional and graduate pathways ===
Hanover offers pre-professional pathways in several fields: Accounting, Education Certification, Engineering, Health Sciences, and Pre-Law.

The college also offers select graduate professional degrees:

- Doctor of Physical Therapy (DPT) via a hybrid, accelerated program with a combination of in-person labs, clinical rotations, and online instruction
- Doctor of Occupational Therapy (OTD), similarly delivered in an accelerated hybrid format emphasizing clinical and scholarly development

=== Faculty and research ===
Faculty at Hanover are actively engaged in teaching, mentorship, and research, offering students opportunities to participate in guided inquiry and independent study.

=== Rankings ===
Hanover College was tied for 103 out of 211 in National Liberal Arts Colleges by U.S. News & World Report in 2025.

== Greek life ==
There are nine national fraternities and sororities.

== Athletics ==
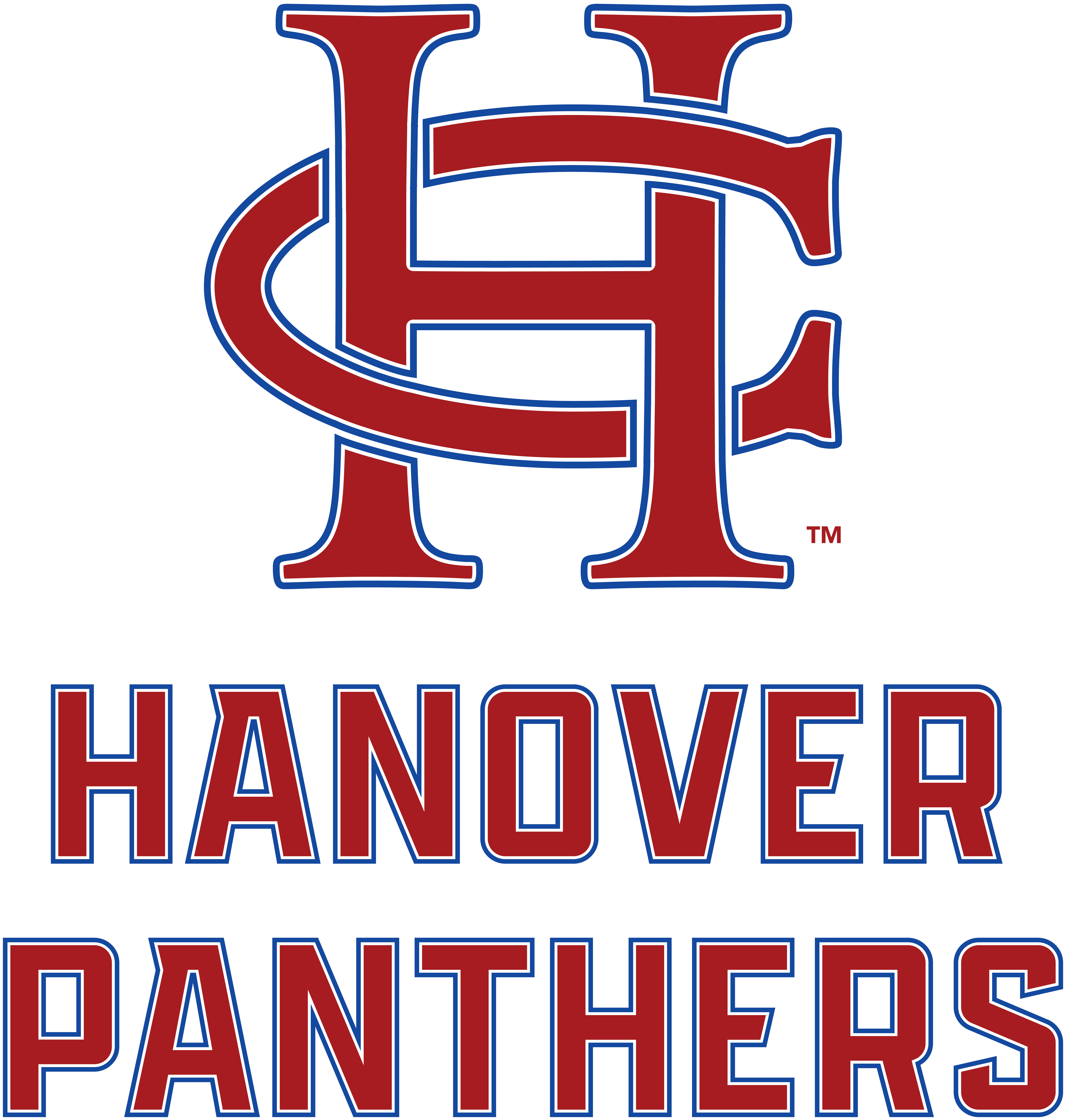
Athletics monogram

Nicknamed the Panthers for their mascot, Hanover College teams participate as a member of the National Collegiate Athletic Association's Division III, and as a member of the Heartland Collegiate Athletic Conference (HCAC). Men's sports include baseball, basketball, cheerleading, cross country, football, golf, lacrosse, soccer, swimming, tennis and track & field; while women's sports include basketball, cheerleading, cross country, golf, lacrosse, soccer, softball, swimming, tennis, track & field, and volleyball. Hanover added men's and women's swimming in the fall of 2018.

== Notable alumni ==
- John M. Bloss 1860, third president of Oregon State University
- Halbert Hains Britan, 1898, philosopher
- James Graham Brown, philanthropist, businessman and real estate developer
- John Merle Coulter 1870, botanist, professor at Hanover College, Wabash College, and University of Chicago; president of Indiana University and Lake Forest University
- Stanley Coulter 1870, dean of School of Sciences at Purdue University
- William A. Cullop, member of United States House of Representatives from Indiana
- Chris Culver, crime novelist
- Thomas Cleland Dawson 1888, diplomat
- Brett Dietz, Arena Football League quarterback for Tampa Bay Storm, head football coach at DePauw University
- Bob Donewald, basketball head coach at Illinois State and Western Michigan; assistant coach of 1976 Indiana Hoosiers national champions
- William Donner 1887, steel industry businessman and philanthropist
- Denny Dorrel, football coach, Bluffton University
- Ebenezer Dumont 1836, member of U.S. House of Representatives from Indiana and brigadier general of Union Army during American Civil War
- Peter Dunn 2000, financial author, radio host, television personality, and speaker
- William M. Dunn, member of U.S. House of Representatives, Judge Advocate General of the United States Army, and delegate to 1850 Constitution of Indiana Convention
- Jonathan Edwards, first president of Washington & Jefferson College
- Harriet Elliott, educator and civic leader
- William Hayden English, politician, member of U.S. House of Representatives, candidate for vice president of the United States and Speaker of the Indiana House of Representatives
- Walter L. Fisher, United States Secretary of the Interior from 1911 to 1913
- Isaac Kwaku Fokuo Jr, consultant and founder at Botho Emerging Markets Group
- Woody Harrelson, actor in films and TV series Cheers; three-time Academy Award nominee
- Charles Sherrod Hatfield 1904, judge of United States Court of Customs and Patent Appeals
- Philip Hedrick 1964, population geneticist
- Thomas Andrews Hendricks 1841, 21st vice president of the United States, governor of Indiana, U.S. senator, member of U.S. House of Representatives, delegate to 1851 Indiana Constitutional Convention
- Eric Holcomb 1990, 51st lieutenant governor of Indiana and 51st governor of Indiana, 2017 – 2025
- Thomas M. Honan, Speaker of the Indiana House of Representatives and Indiana Attorney General
- Peter Kassig, aid worker, taken hostage and beheaded by Islamic State
- Walter LaFeber, historian at Cornell University
- Bertha Lewis, CEO and Chief Organizer of ACORN
- Colonel Leslie MacDill, 1889–1938, early aviation pioneer and US Army Air Corps officer, namesake of MacDill Air Force Base in Florida, headquarters of US CENTCOM
- Marlene Mhangami, developer advocate and software engineer at Microsoft
- John Miller, 1840–1898, justice of the Indiana Supreme Court
- Oscar H. Montgomery, 1859–1936, justice of the Indiana Supreme Court
- John Davis Paris 1833, builder of missionary churches on island of Hawaii
- James Kennedy Patterson 1856, first president of University of Kentucky
- Lafe Pence 1877, member of United States House of Representatives from Colorado
- Mike Pence, 1981, 48th vice president of the United States, 50th governor of Indiana, and member of U.S. House of Representatives
- Albert G. Porter, governor of Indiana and member of U.S. House of Representatives
- John Resig, 2001, co-founder of Resignation Media, LLC in August 2007 and launched theCHIVE in November 2008
- Samuel Holmes Sheppard, neurosurgeon, convicted and later exonerated for the murder of his wife Marilyn Reese Sheppard
- Carol Warner Shields, Pulitzer Prize-winning author
- Micah Shrewsberry, 1999, head coach for the Notre Dame Fighting Irish men's basketball team since 2023
- Monica Sone, author of noted memoir Nisei Daughter
- Reginald H. Thomson, civil engineer who designed modern Seattle
- Robert J. Tracewell, member of U.S. House of Representatives and Comptroller of the U.S. Department of the Treasury
- Tony Vittorio, college baseball coach at IPFW and Dayton
- William Ross Wallace 1836, poet
- George F. Whitworth, Presbyterian missionary, founder of Whitworth College and president of University of Washington
- Harvey W. Wiley, chemist involved with passage of Pure Food and Drug Act of 1906
- James Wylder, writer and founder of publishing house Arcbeatle Press
