= Hanover, Indiana =

- Town
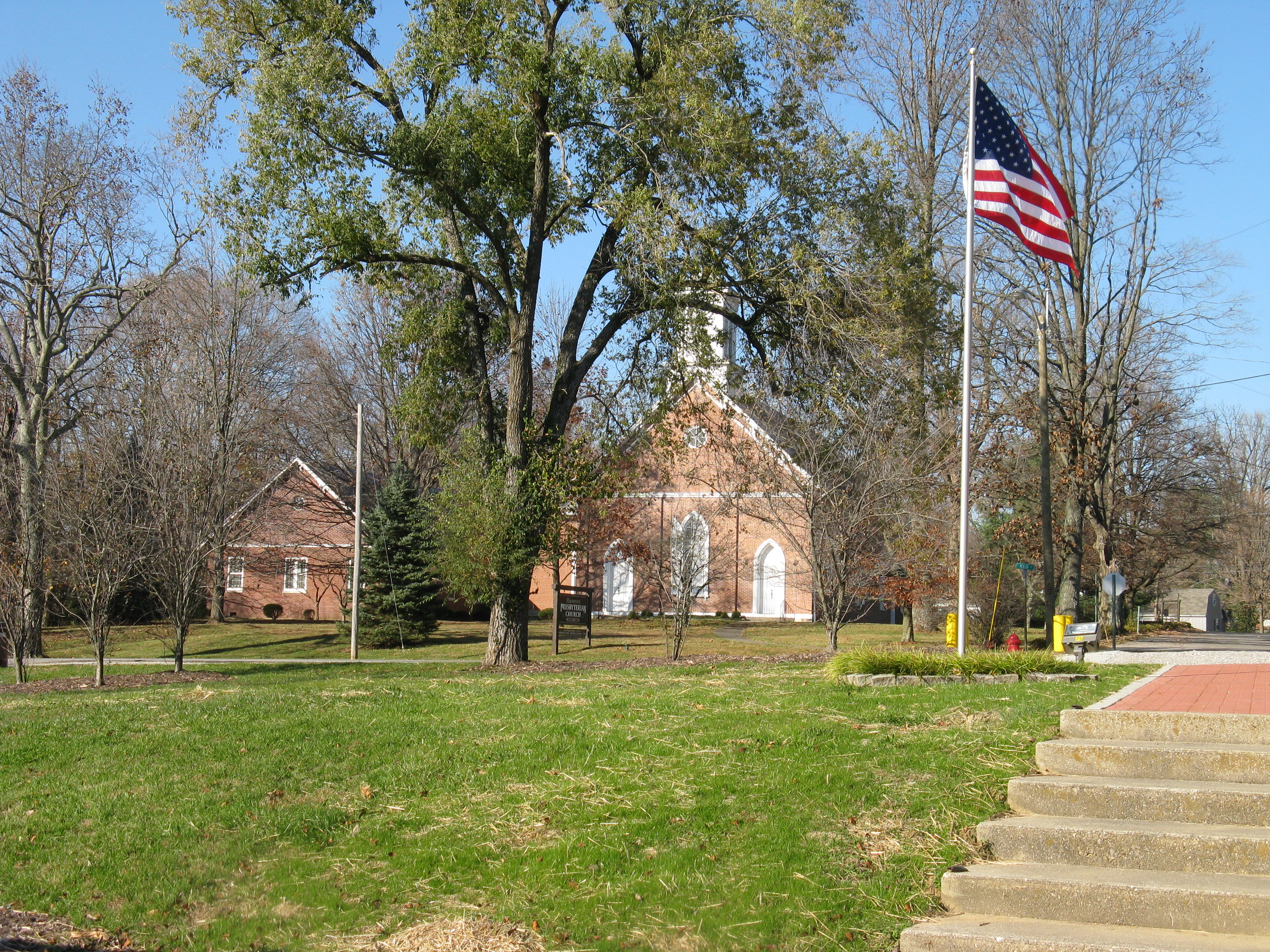
- The Hanover Presbyterian Church, as viewed from Fireman's Park.

- Logo
- Motto(s): "Pride & Prosperity"
- Location of Hanover in Jefferson County, Indiana.
- Coordinates: 38°42′48″N 85°28′21″W
- Country: United States
- State: Indiana
- County: Jefferson
- Township: Hanover

Area
  - Total: 2.23 sq mi (5.77 km^{2})
  - Land: 2.22 sq mi (5.75 km^{2})
  - Water: 0.0039 sq mi (0.01 km^{2})
- Elevation: 778 ft (237 m)

Population (2020)
  - Total: 3,743
  - Density: 1,684.9/sq mi (650.55/km^{2})
- Time zone: UTC-5 (EST)
  - Summer (DST): UTC-4 (EDT)
- ZIP code: 47243
- Area code: 812
- FIPS code: 18-31216
- GNIS feature ID: 2396984
- Website: www.townofhanover.net

Hanover is a town in Hanover Township, Jefferson County, Indiana, United States. Located along the Ohio River, the town had a population of 3,743 at the 2020 census. Hanover is the home of Hanover College, a small Presbyterian liberal arts college. The tallest waterfall in Indiana, Fremont Falls, is located in Hanover.

== History ==
=== Logan's Point ===
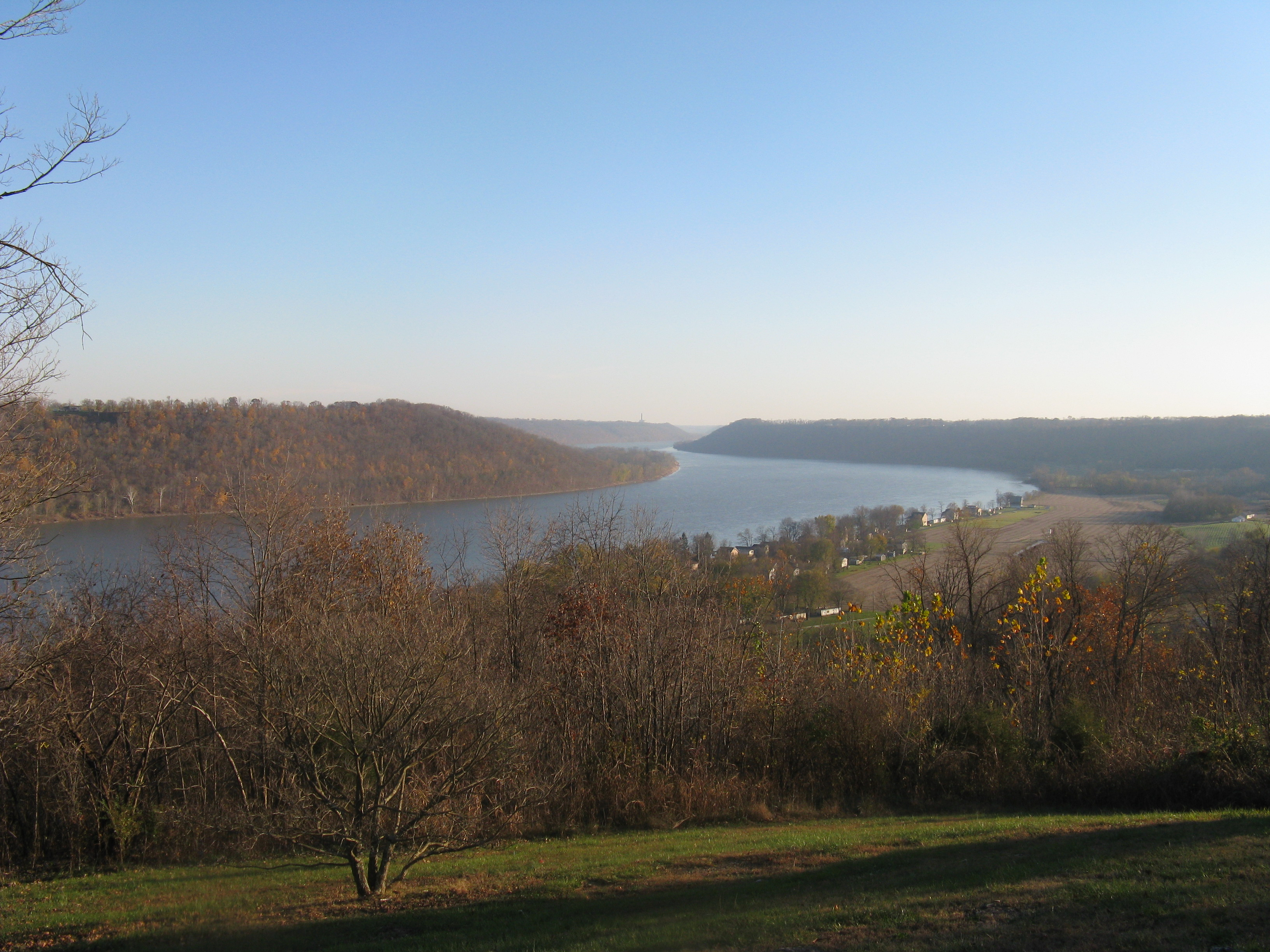
View of the Ohio River from the Point in Hanover.

During the late eighteenth century, the area today known as the state of Indiana was a part of the Northwest Territory in the new United States. This large area west of the Appalachians and north of the Ohio River had been ceded by Great Britain after the Revolutionary War. It consisted of the area later organized as the states of Ohio, Indiana, Michigan, Illinois, Wisconsin, and parts of Minnesota. At that time, there were few European settlements on the northern bank of the Ohio River, although French colonists had settled in the west Illinois Country along the Mississippi River. Kentucky, which developed on the southern banks of the Ohio, was originally considered part of Virginia. In 1792 it was granted statehood after becoming more densely settled by European Americans. Prior to the early nineteenth-century European-American settlement of the Hanover area, its predominant inhabitants were the Shawnee people.

George Logan grew up in a farming household in the area of Lexington, Kentucky. Soon after the turn of the year in 1801, young Logan loaded a barge with produce and embarked on a trading journey westward on the Ohio River, ultimately to sell the produce in New Orleans. He later noted that there were no European-American settlements in the area between present-day Carrollton, Kentucky and Louisville. He said both banks of the river were covered in thick forest, and reported seeing Native American hunters and fishermen, numerous buffalo and deer, and heard the cries of coyotes.

Faced with severe weather toward the end of February, Logan stopped his river journey, pulling in roughly half a mile west of the present-day area of Hanover Beach. After a few days, he went ashore. Armed with a rifle, he climbed a nearby hill to the spot today known as Logan's Point, after him. This was the first recorded instance of a European exploring the area of Hanover. Logan was so enamored with the view from this point that he decided to move there some day. He carved his initials and the date, March 1, 1801, on a beech tree. He did not return to settle for fourteen years.

=== Dunn's Settlement ===
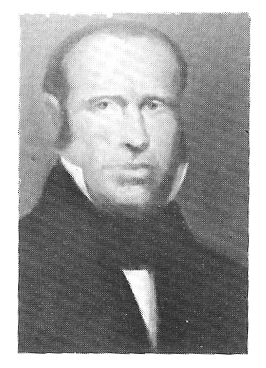
Williamson Dunn, founder of Dunn's Settlement, later known as Hanover

Judge Williamson Dunn, from Mercer County, Kentucky, purchased the land area of modern Hanover from the federal government on November 28, 1808. The following year, Dunn resettled his family to the area, which became known as a town as "Dunn's Settlement." This was later renamed as Hanover. A steady flow of settlers then followed, most of them Scots-Irish Presbyterians. They were immigrants and their children, mostly from northern Ireland, who had come to Virginia, then to Kentucky, and finally to the area of Hanover.

Among them was Christopher Harrison. He later was elected as Indiana's first lieutenant governor and played a key role in planning the state capital of Indianapolis. Harrison built a homestead at Logan's Point. When in 1815 Logan returned to the site, the two men met. Logan bought the land and settled permanently in Hanover, while Harrison moved to Salem, Indiana. The next year he was elected lieutenant governor.

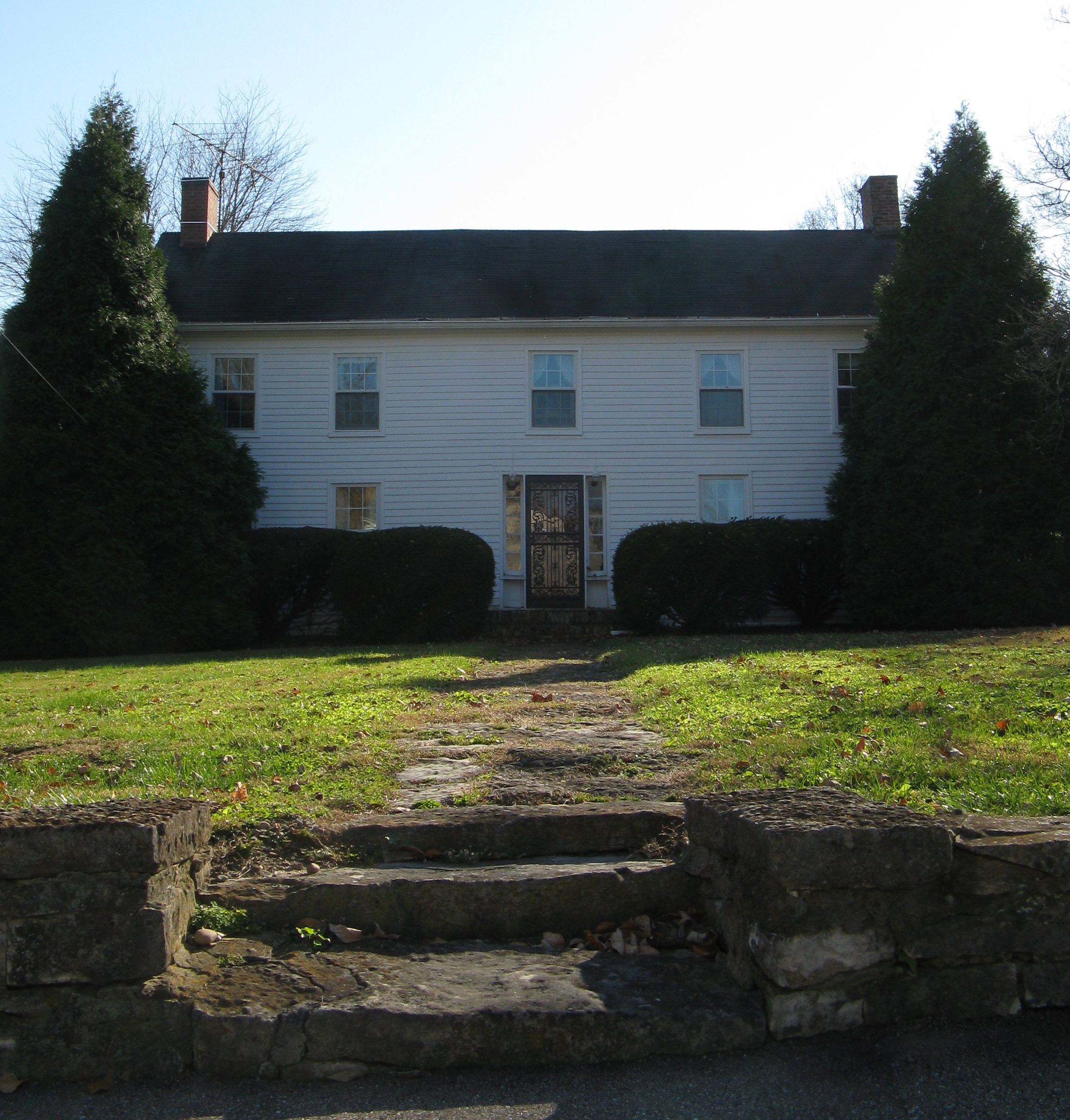
Williamson Dunn's residence, Hanover's first building.

Although many of the first residents were Presbyterian, for a time the only church in their area was in Charlestown, 25 miles to the west. In 1819, Presbyterian minister Thomas C. Searle (January 15, 1787 – October 15, 1821) moved to nearby Madison. He was a circuit preacher, serving the needs of the minority of Presbyterians in a wide area in southern Indiana, but he quickly realized that a community of Scotch-Irish Presbyterians was concentrated in Dunn's Settlement. On March 4, 1820, Searle founded the Hanover Presbyterian Church. His wife, a native of Hanover, New Hampshire, was greatly admired by the church's congregants; therefore, the church adopted the name in her honor. Before long, the town also adopted the name "Hanover." Officially it was named "South Hanover" as there was already a post office of Hanover in Shelby County. When the other town of Hanover no longer had a post office, South Hanover's name was shortened to Hanover.

Following the founding of the congregation, they organized to construct a church. Williamson Dunn donated land and funding for the cause. In October 1821, Searle died, and the minister's post at the church was not filled until 1823.

=== Founding of Hanover College ===
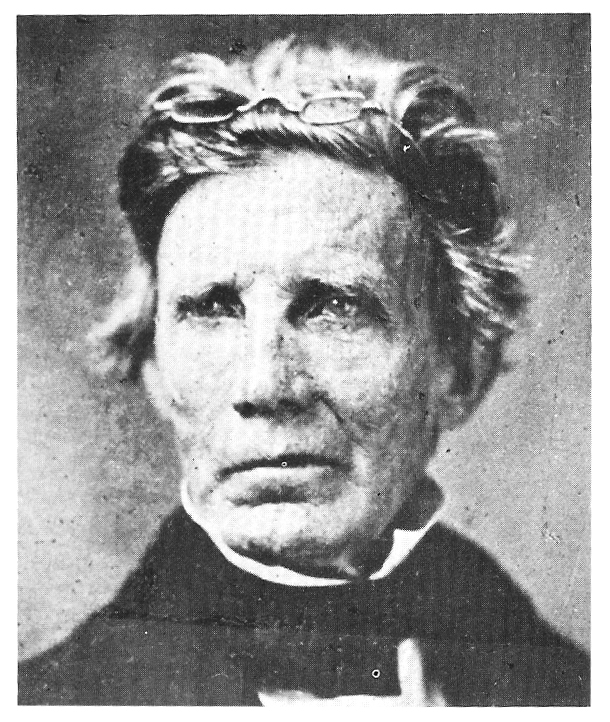
John Finley Crowe, founder of Hanover College

John Finley Crowe was born in Greene County, Tennessee, growing up there and in Missouri, where his family migrated. He grew up in a Presbyterian household. After meeting some Presbyterian elders who had moved from North Carolina to his area in Missouri, Crowe became interested in pursuing a religious education. He attended Transylvania College in Lexington, Kentucky, and continued his education at Princeton Theological Seminary in Princeton, New Jersey. After completing his Masters of Divinity in 1815, Crowe accepted his first ministerial calling in Shelbyville, Kentucky. It was a slave state, but Crowe became actively involved in the abolitionist movement. He established a Sunday school for African-American children, but could not find a place where they were allowed to meet. On May 7, 1822, he began publication of the Abolition Intelligence and Missionary Magazine. Crowe's abolitionist sympathies alienated him from his slave-holding neighbors, and he soon lost access to the printing press.

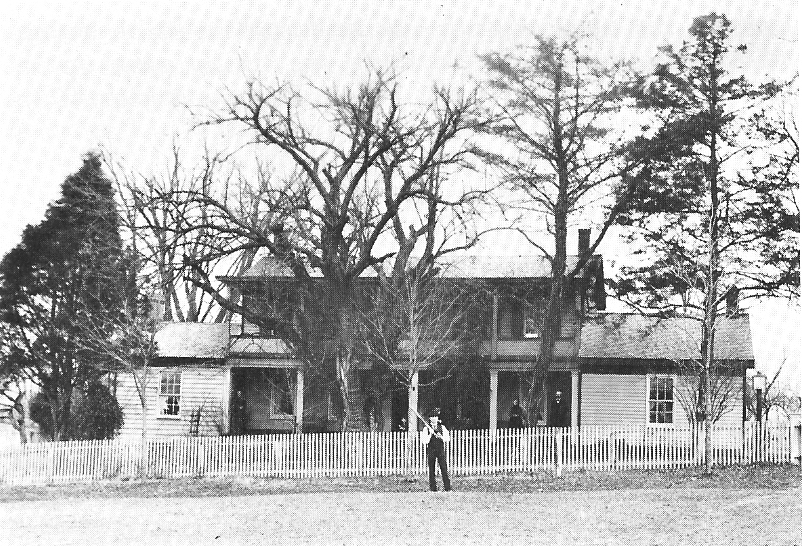
Residence of John Finley Crowe in Hanover, now listed on the National Register of Historic Places

On April 2, 1823, John M. Dickey, moderator of a church session attended by Williamson Dunn and George Logan as elders, sent a letter to Crowe inviting him to serve at the Hanover Presbyterian Church. Disheartened by the hostility of neighbors in Kentucky, Crowe accepted the position, relieved to move to a free state. Soon after arriving in Hanover, Crowe began construction of his house. It still exists and is known today as the Crowe-Garritt House. Located just north of the present-day Hanover Presbyterian Church, the Crowe-Garritt House was added to the National Register of Historic Places in 1980.

Soon after joining the Hanover Presbyterian Church, Crowe began encouraging members to sponsor the founding of a seminary. The religious academy opened in Hanover on January 1, 1827. Initially, classes met in the Presbyterian Church's stone church building, which was located in the present-day area of the Hanover Firehouse. Within a year, however, the school had outgrown this location. Williamson Dunn donated land for the site of a new college building. In 1829, the state of Indiana granted a charter for Hanover Academy, essentially with a classical high school curriculum.

The Presbyterian Synod of Indiana recognized the theological segment of the school as the Indiana Seminary. Hanover Academy grew quickly over the ensuing years, adding to its programs. In 1833 it received a charter from the state of Indiana to form a four-year college under the name of Hanover College. But the seminary stagnated, and the two entities split in 1836. In 1841 the religious seminary moved to New Albany, Indiana. Faced with money problems and with students divided on the issue of slavery, in 1859 the seminary moved and reopened in Chicago, Illinois, as McCormick Theological Seminary. It was sponsored by a major business donor.

== Religion ==
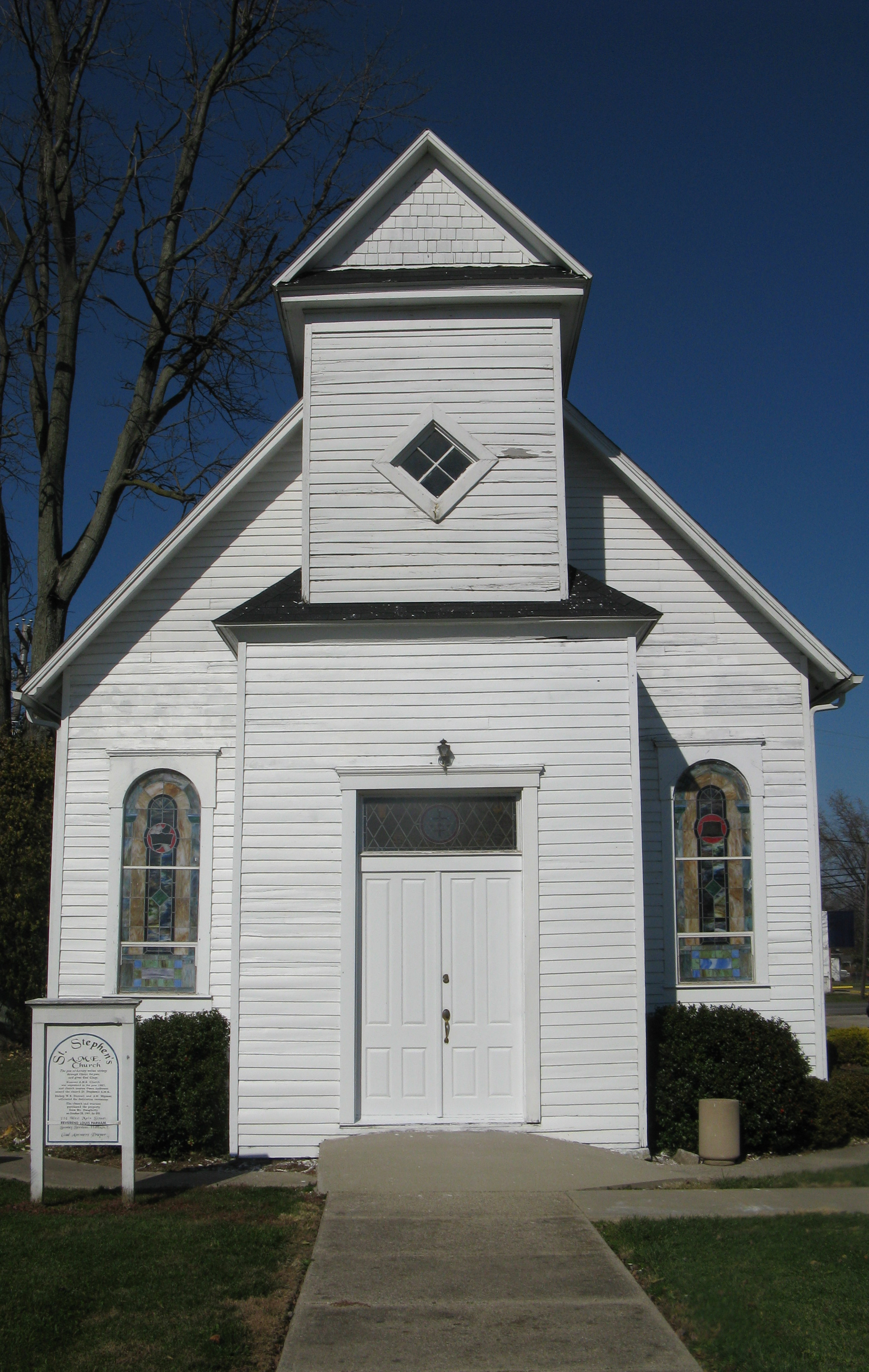
St. Stephen's African Methodist Episcopal Church in Hanover, Indiana.

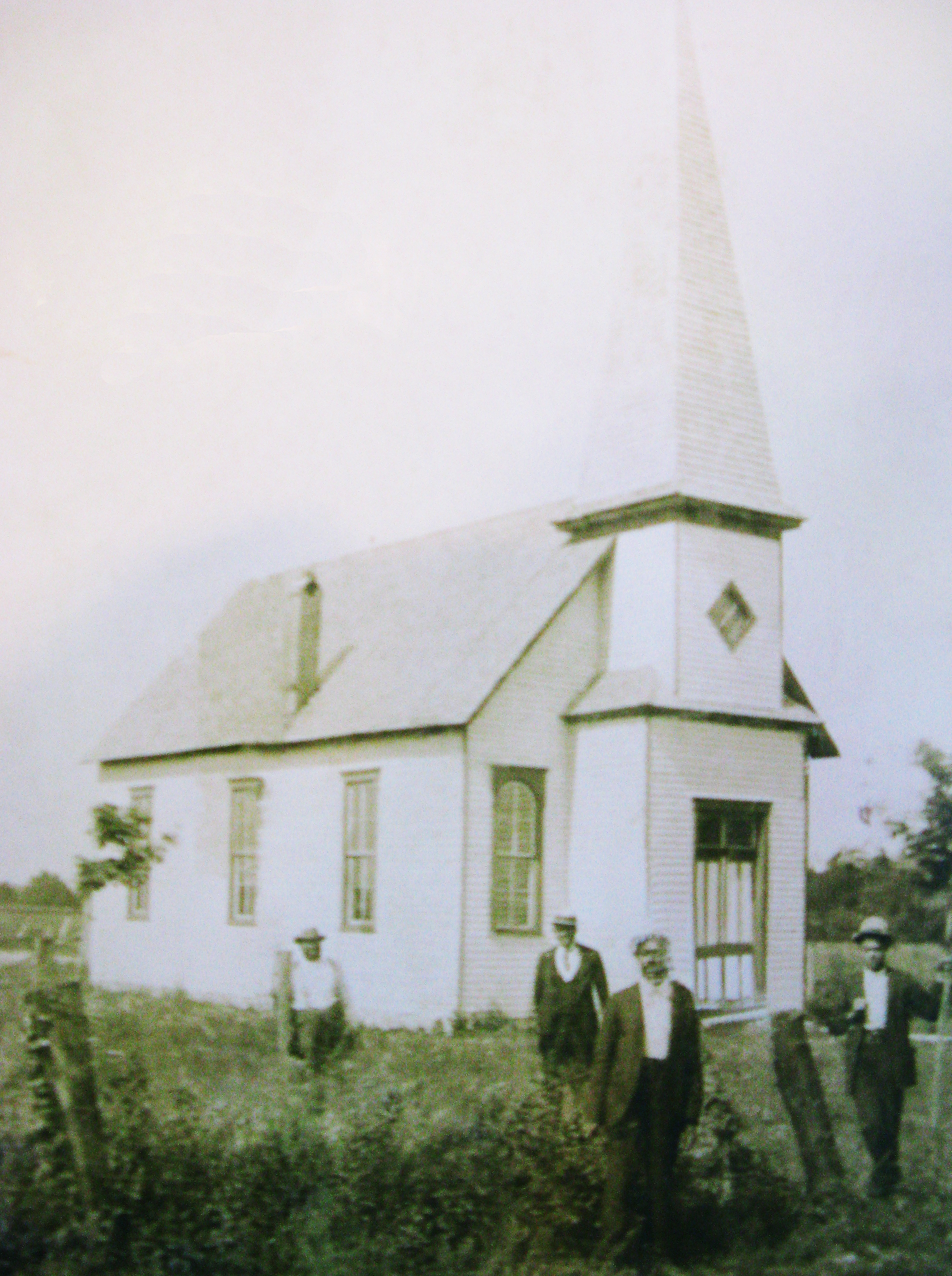
Late nineteenth or early twentieth-century view of St. Stephen's African Methodist Episcopal Church in Hanover, Indiana.

Although Hanover was largely founded by Presbyterians, people of other denominations soon also moved into the area. In the United States west of the Appalachian Mountains as a whole, Baptists and Methodists largely outnumbered Presbyterians during the early nineteenth century. Hanover Methodist Church was founded in 1846; the Hanover Baptist Church soon followed. The First Christian Church (Disciples of Christ) was founded in 1974.

St. Stephen's African Methodist Episcopal Church, which belonged to the first independent Black denomination founded in the United States, was listed on the National Register of Historic Places in 2000.

== Geography ==
According to the 2010 census, Hanover has a total area of 2.31 square miles (5.98 km^{2}), all land.

=== Climate ===
The climate in this area is characterized by hot, humid summers and generally mild to cool winters. According to the Köppen Climate Classification system, Hanover has a humid subtropical climate, abbreviated "Cfa" on climate maps.

== Demographics ==
Historical population
Census	Pop.	Note	%±
1870	564		—
1880	376		−33.3%
1890	459		22.1%
1900	377		−17.9%
1910	356		−5.6%
1920	360		1.1%
1930	390		8.3%
1940	406		4.1%
1950	1,060		161.1%
1960	1,170		10.4%
1970	3,018		157.9%
1980	4,054		34.3%
1990	3,610		−11.0%
2000	2,834		−21.5%
2010	3,546		25.1%
2020	3,743		5.6%
U.S. Decennial Census

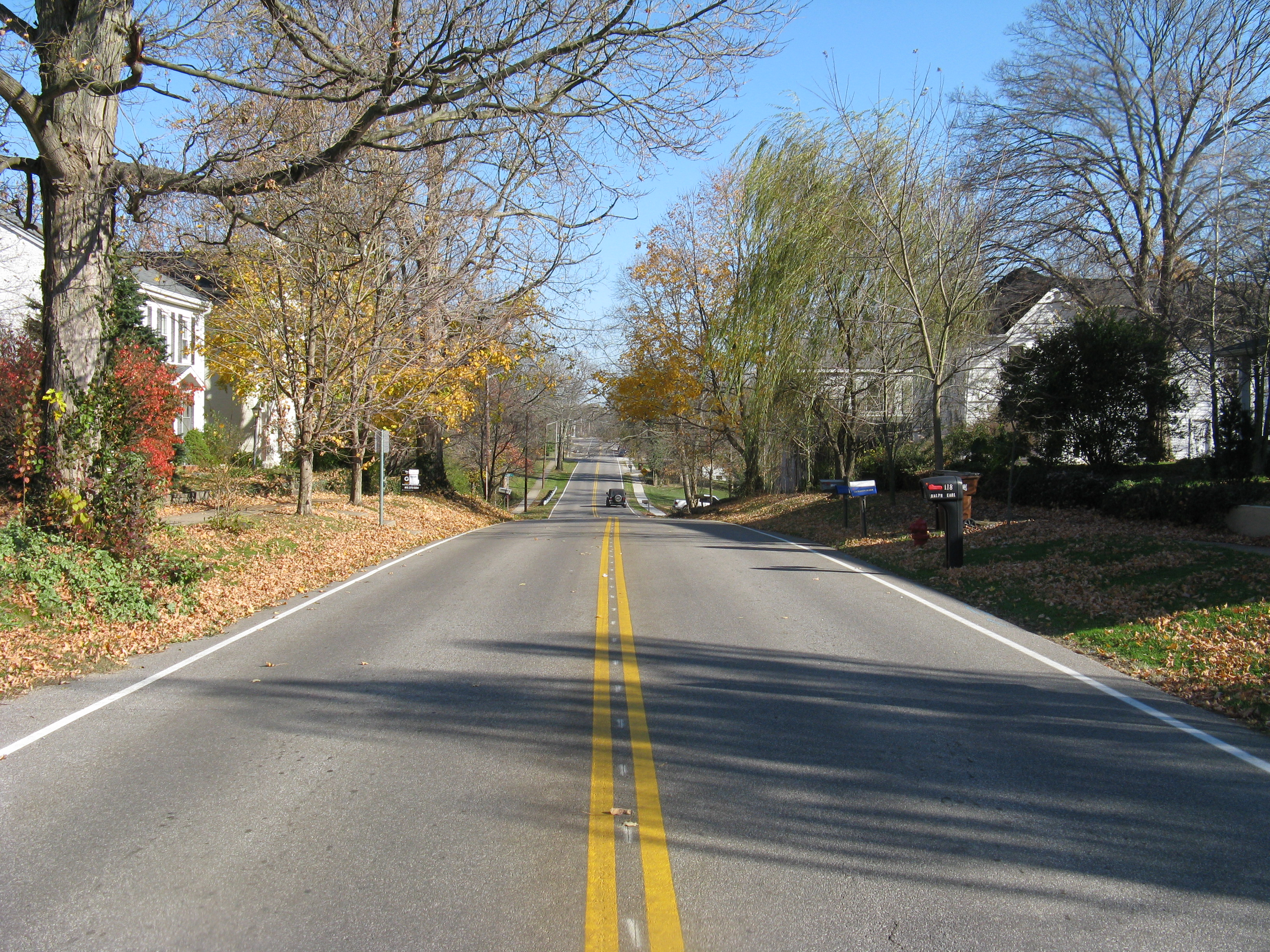
View of Main Street in Hanover.

=== 2020 census ===
As of the 2020 census, Hanover had a population of 3,743. The median age was 24.3 years. 19.0% of residents were under the age of 18 and 12.8% of residents were 65 years of age or older. For every 100 females there were 89.7 males, and for every 100 females age 18 and over there were 85.6 males age 18 and over.

92.4% of residents lived in urban areas, while 7.6% lived in rural areas.

There were 1,079 households in Hanover, of which 33.5% had children under the age of 18 living in them. Of all households, 39.5% were married-couple households, 19.3% were households with a male householder and no spouse or partner present, and 31.1% were households with a female householder and no spouse or partner present. About 28.2% of all households were made up of individuals and 10.9% had someone living alone who was 65 years of age or older.

There were 1,191 housing units, of which 9.4% were vacant. The homeowner vacancy rate was 4.2% and the rental vacancy rate was 4.8%.

Racial composition as of the 2020 census
Race	Number	Percent
White	3,273	87.4%
Black or African American	125	3.3%
American Indian and Alaska Native	16	0.4%
Asian	28	0.7%
Native Hawaiian and Other Pacific Islander	4	0.1%
Some other race	141	3.8%
Two or more races	156	4.2%
Hispanic or Latino (of any race)	205	5.5%

=== 2010 census ===
As of the census of 2010, there were 3,546 people, 1,075 households, and 686 families residing in the town. The population density was 1,535.1 inhabitants per square mile (592.7/km^{2}). There were 1,216 housing units at an average density of 526.4 per square mile (203.2/km^{2}). The racial makeup of the town was 94.9% White, 2.3% African American, 0.2% Native American, 0.8% Asian, 0.6% from other races, and 1.3% from two or more races. Hispanic or Latino of any race were 2.4% of the population.

There were 1,075 households, of which 33.5% had children under the age of 18 living with them, 44.0% were married couples living together, 14.5% had a female householder with no husband present, 5.3% had a male householder with no wife present, and 36.2% were non-families. 29.4% of all households were made up of individuals, and 12.1% had someone living alone who was 65 years of age or older. The average household size was 2.43 and the average family size was 2.96.

The median age in the town was 26.2 years. 18.6% of residents were under the age of 18; 30% were between the ages of 18 and 24; 21.1% were from 25 to 44; 18.3% were from 45 to 64; and 12% were 65 years of age or older. The gender makeup of the town was 47.6% male and 52.4% female.

=== 2000 census ===
As of the census of 2000, there were 2,834 people, 1,068 households, and 760 families residing in the town. The population density was 1,349.2 inhabitants per square mile (520.9/km^{2}). There were 1,144 housing units at an average density of 544.6 per square mile (210.3/km^{2}). The racial makeup of the town was 96.58% White, 2.05% African American, 0.18% Native American, 0.32% Asian, 0.07% Pacific Islander, 0.35% from other races, and 0.46% from two or more races. Hispanic or Latino of any race were 1.24% of the population.

There were 1,068 households, out of which 37.5% had children under the age of 18 living with them, 50.8% were married couples living together, 16.0% had a female householder with no husband present, and 28.8% were non-families. 24.4% of all households were made up of individuals, and 8.6% had someone living alone who was 65 years of age or older. The average household size was 2.54 and the average family size was 2.99.

In the town, the population was spread out, with 27.8% under the age of 18, 9.5% from 18 to 24, 28.1% from 25 to 44, 20.3% from 45 to 64, and 14.3% who were 65 years of age or older. The median age was 34 years. For every 100 females, there were 88.8 males. For every 100 females age 18 and over, there were 87.5 males.

The median income for a household in the town was $37,944, and the median income for a family was $42,574. Males had a median income of $30,000 versus $23,384 for females. The per capita income for the town was $16,520. About 5.7% of families and 8.5% of the population were below the poverty line, including 10.8% of those under age 18 and 2.3% of those age 65 or over.

== Education ==
It is in the Southwestern Jefferson County Consolidated Schools school district. Southwestern High School is the public high school.

Hanover has a public library, a branch of the Jefferson County Public Library.

== See also ==
- List of cities and towns along the Ohio River
