= National Register of Historic Places listings in Clark County, Indiana =

Location of Clark County in Indiana

This is a list of the National Register of Historic Places listings in Clark County, Indiana.

This is intended to be a complete list of the properties and districts on the National Register of Historic Places in Clark County, Indiana, United States. Latitude and longitude coordinates are provided for many National Register properties and districts; these locations may be seen together in an online map.

There are 26 properties and districts listed on the National Register in the county. Another property was once listed but has been removed.

Properties and districts located in incorporated areas display the name of the municipality, while properties and districts in unincorporated areas display the name of their civil township. Properties and districts split between multiple jurisdictions display the names of all jurisdictions.

This National Park Service list is complete through NPS recent listings posted July 10, 2026.

== Current listings ==
	Name on the Register	Image	Date listed	Location	City or town	Description
1	Abbott-Holloway Farm	Abbott-Holloway Farm	September 8, 1994 (#94001129)	Roughly bounded by 2nd and Walnut Sts. and the Ohio River at Bethlehem; 38°32′16″N 85°25′15″W	Bethlehem Township	
2	Bottorff-McCulloch Farm	Bottorff-McCulloch Farm	June 9, 1995 (#95000699)	6702 Bethany Rd., southwest of Charlestown; 38°24′53″N 85°41′14″W	Charlestown Township	
3	Centralia Court Historic District		May 23, 2022 (#100007733)	Centralia Ct. (east and west sides) and Gutford Rd. (east side) between Providence Way and Emerson Ave., and north side of Emerson Ave. between Centralia Ct. and Gutford Rd. 38°18′23″N 85°47′09″W	Clarksville	
4	Clark-McKinley Historic District		May 30, 2023 (#100009012)	Roughly the east side of North Clark Blvd. and the west side of McKinley Ave. between Francis and Brooks Aves. 38°17′29″N 85°45′58″W	Clarksville	
5	Thomas Downs House	Thomas Downs House	December 6, 1984 (#84000490)	1045 Main St. 38°26′40″N 85°39′35″W	Charlestown	
6	Benjamin Ferguson House	Benjamin Ferguson House	June 16, 1983 (#83000118)	673 High St. 38°26′28″N 85°39′46″W	Charlestown	
7	M. Fine & Sons Building		August 21, 2020 (#100005505)	835 Spring St. 38°16′38″N 85°44′42″W	Jeffersonville	
8	Francis Avenue Historic District		May 19, 2025 (#100011860)	Each side of Francis Avenue extending approximately 400 feet west of Bailey Avenue; 38°17′27″N 85°46′35″W	Clarksville	
9	Henry French House	Henry French House	June 29, 1989 (#89000772)	217 E. High St. 38°16′49″N 85°43′16″W	Jeffersonville	
10	Grisamore House	Grisamore House	May 9, 1983 (#83000119)	111-113 W. Chestnut St. 38°16′17″N 85°44′27″W	Jeffersonville	
11	Howard Home	Howard Home	July 5, 1973 (#73000031)	1101 E. Market St. 38°16′42″N 85°43′31″W	Jeffersonville	
12	Mitchell P. Howes' Lime Kiln and Quarry	Mitchell P. Howes' Lime Kiln and Quarry	December 30, 2013 (#13001007)	Upper River Rd. 38°20′30″N 85°38′54″W	Utica Township	
13	Indiana State Prison South-Indiana Reformatory- Colgate-Palmolive Historic District	Indiana State Prison South-Indiana Reformatory- Colgate-Palmolive Historic District	March 13, 2019 (#100003501)	1410 S. Clark Blvd. 38°16′28″N 85°45′10″W	Clarksville	
14	Lincoln Heights Historic District		March 6, 2020 (#100005043)	Bounded by Lewis & Clark Pkwy., Hibiscus Dr., the south side of Lynnwood Dr., and Lincoln Dr. 38°18′15″N 85°46′35″W	Clarksville	
15	Louisville Municipal Bridge, Pylons and Administration Building	Louisville Municipal Bridge, Pylons and Administration Building	March 8, 1984 (#84001578)	Spans the Ohio River between Louisville, Kentucky and Jeffersonville; 38°15′52″N 85°45′06″W	Jeffersonville	Extends into Jefferson County, Kentucky
16	Old Clarksville Site	Old Clarksville Site	December 16, 1974 (#74000028)	Off Harrison Ave. at the Ohio River; 38°17′13″N 85°46′34″W	Clarksville	
17	Old Jeffersonville Historic District	Old Jeffersonville Historic District	October 6, 1987 (#87001461)	Roughly bounded by Court Ave., Graham St., the Ohio River, and Interstate 65; 38°16′26″N 85°44′11″W	Jeffersonville	
18	Patterson Place Historic District	Patterson Place Historic District	July 7, 2023 (#100009013)	Roughly bounded by Clark Blvd., Harrison, Sunset, Howard, and Stansifer Aves. including each side of Patterson Ave. 38°17′07″N 85°45′44″W	Clarksville	
19	Pleasant Ridge Historic District		December 3, 2018 (#100003178)	Roughly between Hampton Ct., Marcy, Audubon, and Thompson Sts., Winthrop and Kenwood Aves., and Halcyon and Ridge Rds. 38°26′50″N 85°40′16″W	Charlestown	
20	Smith-Sutton Site	Smith-Sutton Site	April 10, 2012 (#12000183)	Address Restricted	Utica Township	
21	Spring Street Freight House	Spring Street Freight House	March 29, 2007 (#07000209)	1030 Spring St. 38°16′49″N 85°44′48″W	Jeffersonville	Former depot of the Big Four Railroad
22	Samuel Starkweather's Lime Kiln and Quarry	Samuel Starkweather's Lime Kiln and Quarry	December 30, 2013 (#13001008)	Upper River Rd. 38°20′46″N 85°38′43″W	Utica Township	
23	Moses H. Tyler Company Lime Kiln and Quarry No. 1	Moses H. Tyler Company Lime Kiln and Quarry No. 1	December 30, 2013 (#13001009)	Upper River Rd. 38°20′32″N 85°38′53″W	Utica Township	
24	Victory Court Historic District		May 19, 2025 (#100011867)	East side of Victory Court, a semicircular loop road. 38°18′22″N 85°46′46″W	Clarksville	
25	Watson House	Watson House	September 1, 1983 (#83000051)	1015 Water St. 38°26′43″N 85°39′39″W	Charlestown	
26	John Work House and Mill Site	John Work House and Mill Site	January 3, 2001 (#00001546)	Northern side of Tunnel Mill Rd., west of Fourteen Mile Creek and northeast of Charlestown; 38°28′54″N 85°37′34″W	Charlestown Township	Site of Tunnel Mill Scout Reservation

== Former listing ==
	Name on the Register	Image	Date listed	Date removed	Location	City or town	Description
1	Borden Institute		June 13, 1973 (#73000030)	July 16, 1986	West St. 38°28′05″N 85°56′37″W	Borden	Demolished.

== See also ==
- List of National Historic Landmarks in Indiana
- National Register of Historic Places listings in Indiana
- Listings in neighboring counties: Floyd, Jefferson, Jefferson (KY), Oldham (KY), Scott, Trimble (KY), Washington
- List of Indiana state historical markers in Clark County
- List of attractions and events in the Louisville metropolitan area
