= Utica, Indiana =

- Town
- Town of Utica
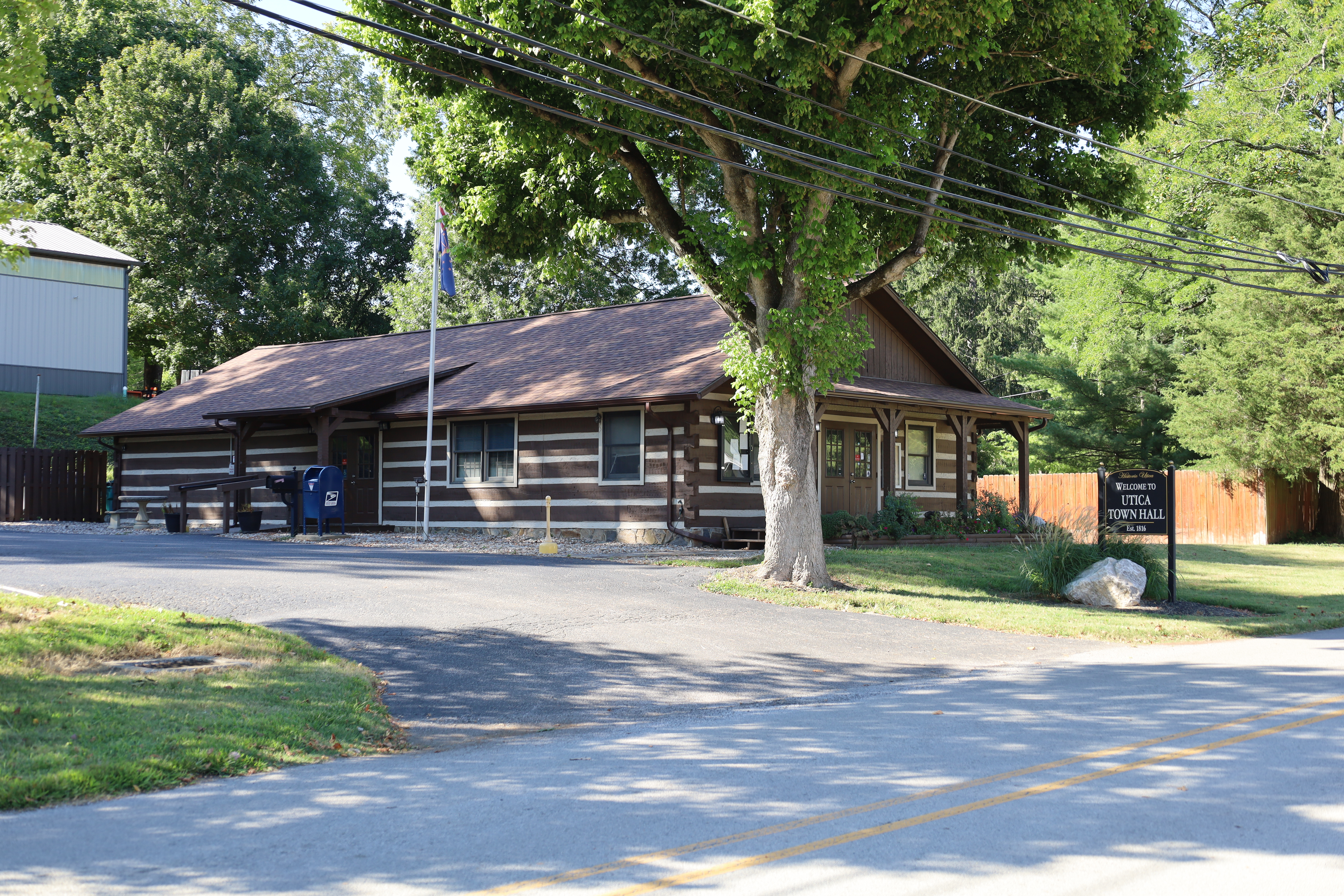
- Utica Town Hall in 2025

- Location of Utica in Clark County, Indiana.
- Coordinates: 38°21′24″N 85°39′08″W
- Country: United States
- State: Indiana
- County: Clark
- Township: Utica

Area
  - Total: 1.44 sq mi (3.73 km^{2})
  - Land: 1.19 sq mi (3.08 km^{2})
  - Water: 0.25 sq mi (0.65 km^{2})
- Elevation: 522 ft (159 m)

Population (2020)
  - Total: 860
  - Density: 723.3/sq mi (279.25/km^{2})
- Time zone: UTC-5 (Eastern (EST))
  - Summer (DST): UTC-4 (EDT)
- ZIP code: 47130
- Area code: 812
- FIPS code: 18-78110
- GNIS feature ID: 2397708
- Website: uticaindiana.org

Utica is a town in Utica Township, Clark County, Indiana, United States. It lies adjacent to major infrastructure: the Interstate 265 bridge across the Ohio (opened in 2016), the nearby Port of Indiana – Jeffersonville, and the River Ridge Commerce Center. These developments shape its land-use environment and limit the town's potential for large-scale growth.

Between 1990 and 2020 the population of Utica more than doubled. In this period several new residential subdivisions emerged in the area. Although the town is geographically constrained, the influx of new housing helped fuel the population increase.

== History ==
From 1794 to 1825, Utica served as a key ferry crossing of the Ohio River. Its location provided a safer alternative to the river crossings at Jeffersonville, where the nearby Falls of the Ohio presented navigational hazards.

James Noble Wood was the first ferryman and founder of Utica. In 1801 he was appointed by Governor W. H. Harrison as one of the justices of the court of general quarter of Clarke of the Territory of Indiana at Springville, Indiana.

Daniel Guernsey, migrated with his family from Connecticut to Clark County in 1817. The Guernsey family traveled by flatboat from Olean Point to their landing near Utica. After a year's farming in the township, Guernsey purchased 200 acres near Blue Lick, Indiana, where the family remained for decades. He graduated from Yale, and was the first school teacher in Monroe County.

In 1997, the town experienced significant flooding. In response, local officials strengthened building, planning and zoning regulations as a condition of receiving federal and state disaster-recovery assistance.

=== Gateway to the Region ===
In the years following settlement, Utica became a starting point for several interior roads leading into southern Indiana. Among the earliest was the Utica and Salem Road, opened about 1820 and running northwest through New Providence and the uplands toward Salem in Washington County. Portions of the route followed older traces used as early as 1810 between Blue Lick and Flowers Gap, providing one of the first reliable passages across the Knobstone Ridge. Other early roads connected Utica to Madison in Jefferson County and to the early seat of Scott County, forming the nucleus of Clark County's overland travel network.

== Geography ==
According to the 2010 census, Utica has a total area of 1.448 square miles (3.75 km^{2}), of which 1.27 square miles (3.29 km^{2}) (or 87.71%) is land and 0.178 square miles (0.46 km^{2}) (or 12.29%) is water.

== Gallery ==
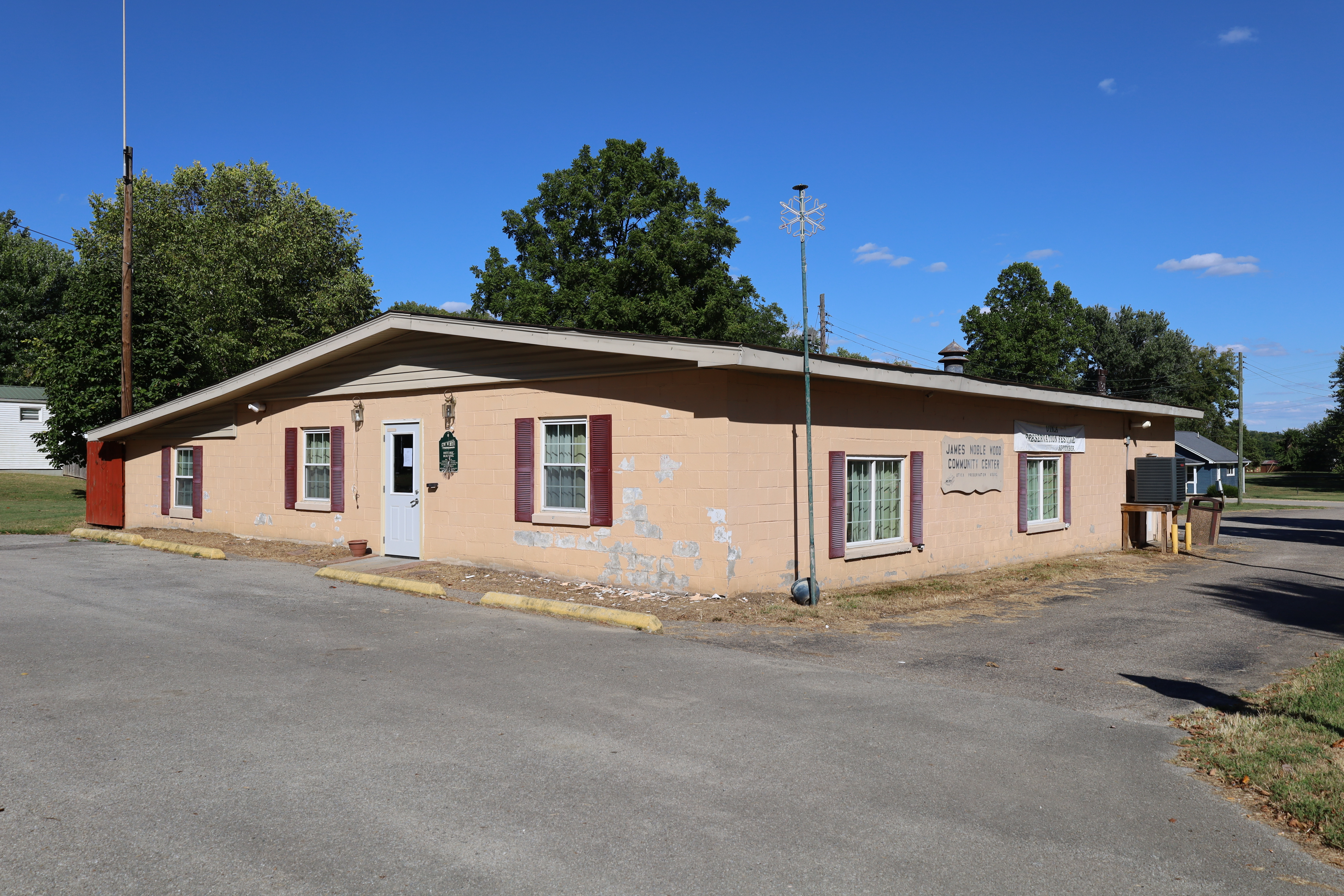
Historic community center, formerly the fire station, in 2025

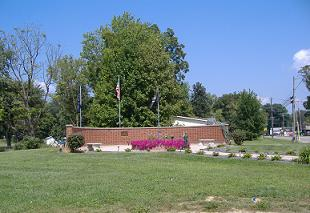
Memorial in Utica, Indiana

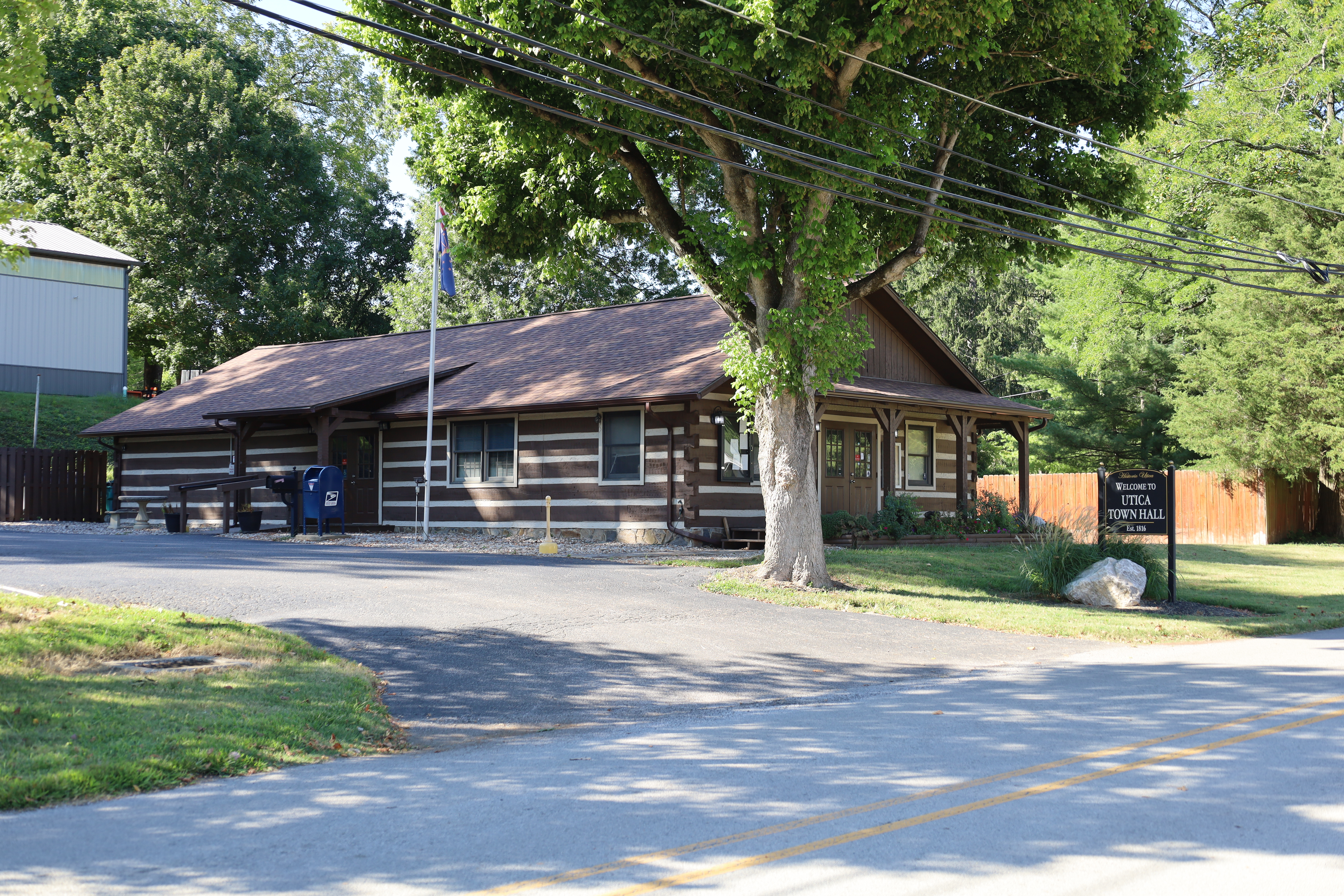
Utica Town Hall in 2025

== Demographics ==
Historical population
Census	Pop.	Note	%±
1880	525		—
1970	644		—
1980	501		−22.2%
1990	411		−18.0%
2000	591		43.8%
2010	776		31.3%
2020	860		10.8%
U.S. Decennial Census

=== 2010 census ===
As of the census of 2010, there were 776 people, 328 households, and 212 families living in the town. The population density was 611.0 inhabitants per square mile (235.9/km^{2}). There were 379 housing units at an average density of 298.4 per square mile (115.2/km^{2}). The racial makeup of the town was 89.6% White, 3.4% African American, 0.8% Native American, 1.9% Asian, 1.9% from other races, and 2.4% from two or more races. Hispanic or Latino of any race were 3.4% of the population.

There were 328 households, of which 29.3% had children under the age of 18 living with them, 48.5% were married couples living together, 10.7% had a female householder with no husband present, 5.5% had a male householder with no wife present, and 35.4% were non-families. 28.7% of all households were made up of individuals, and 6.7% had someone living alone who was 65 years of age or older. The average household size was 2.37 and the average family size was 2.88.

The median age in the town was 43.3 years. 19.3% of residents were under the age of 18; 7.4% were between the ages of 18 and 24; 25.4% were from 25 to 44; 33.7% were from 45 to 64; and 14.2% were 65 years of age or older. The gender makeup of the town was 47.7% male and 52.3% female.

=== 2000 census ===
As of the census of 2000, there were 591 people, 254 households, and 164 families living in the town. The population density was 1,361.7 inhabitants per square mile (525.8/km^{2}). There were 279 housing units at an average density of 642.8 per square mile (248.2/km^{2}). The racial makeup of the town was 97.63% White, 1.02% African American, 0.17% Native American, 0.34% Asian, 0.51% from other races, and 0.34% from two or more races. Hispanic or Latino of any race were 1.18% of the population.

There were 254 households, out of which 23.2% had children under the age of 18 living with them, 50.0% were married couples living together, 9.8% had a female householder with no husband present, and 35.4% were non-families. 30.7% of all households were made up of individuals, and 11.4% had someone living alone who was 65 years of age or older. The average household size was 2.33 and the average family size was 2.85.

In the town, the population was spread out, with 21.0% under the age of 18, 6.8% from 18 to 24, 23.9% from 25 to 44, 33.0% from 45 to 64, and 15.4% who were 65 years of age or older. The median age was 44 years. For every 100 females, there were 87.0 males. For every 100 females age 18 and over, there were 92.2 males.

The median income for a household in the town was $36,023, and the median income for a family was $38,750. Males had a median income of $35,156 versus $19,821 for females. The per capita income for the town was $23,518. About 5.3% of families and 8.1% of the population were below the poverty line, including 6.7% of those under age 18 and 19.4% of those age 65 or over.
