= Jeffersonville Township, Clark County, Indiana =

Jeffersonville Township
- Township
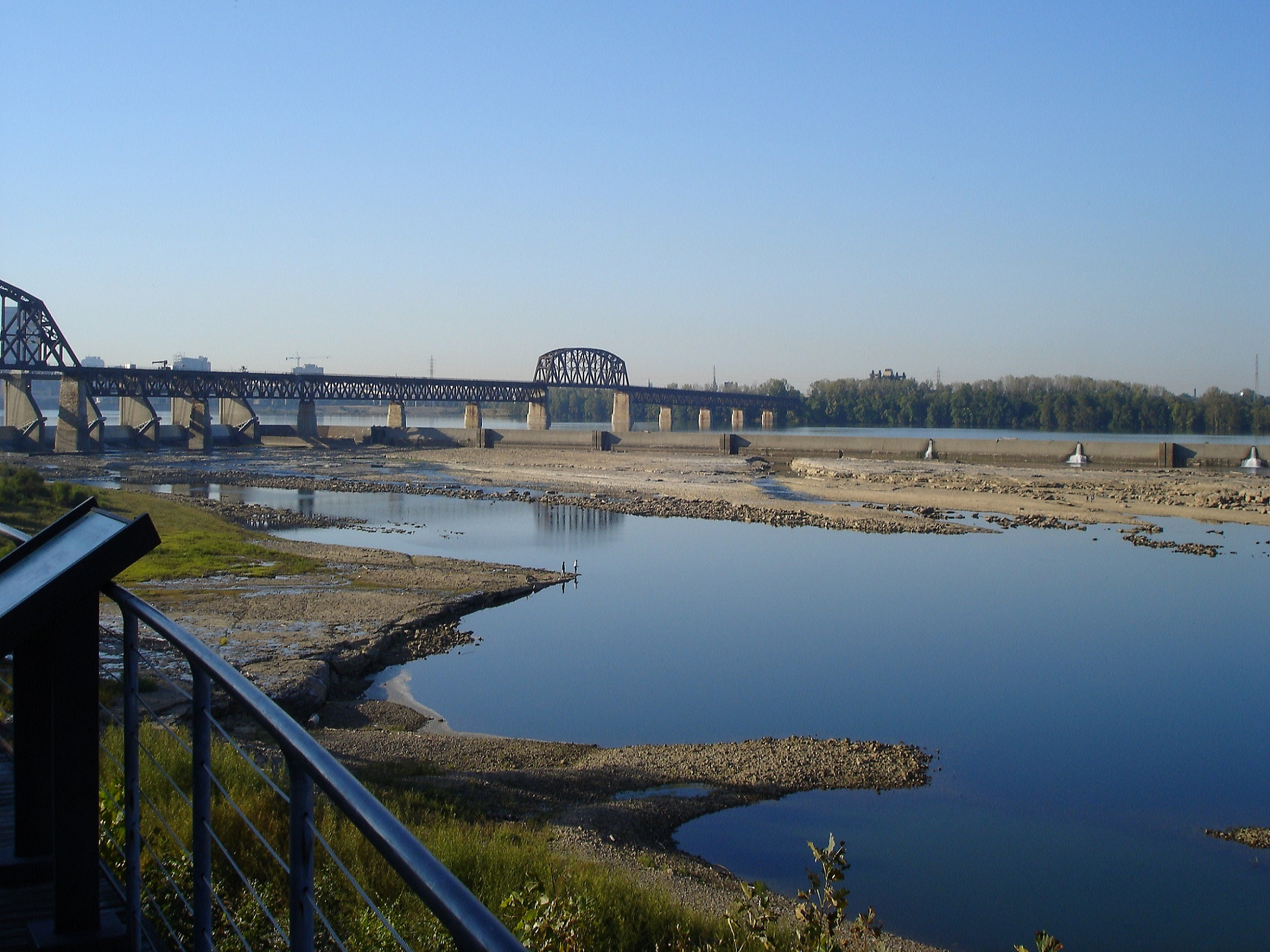
- The Ohio River from Jeffersonville Township

- Location of Jeffersonville Township in Clark County
- Coordinates: 38°18′57″N 85°44′18″W
- Country: United States
- State: Indiana
- County: Clark

Government
  - Type: Indiana township

Area
  - Total: 26.88 sq mi (69.6 km^{2})
  - Land: 26.57 sq mi (68.8 km^{2})
  - Water: 0.31 sq mi (0.80 km^{2})
- Elevation: 490 ft (150 m)

Population (2020)
  - Total: 61,469
  - Density: 2,223/sq mi (858/km^{2})
- FIPS code: 18-38367
- GNIS feature ID: 453505

Jeffersonville Township is one of twelve townships in Clark County, Indiana. As of the 2010 census, its population was 59,062 and it contained 27,023 housing units.

== History ==
Jeffersonville Township was organized in 1817.

== Government ==
Jeffersonville Township is governed by the Jeffersonville Township Trustee's office. The current Jeffersonville Trustee is Dale Popp. The Trustee works with a three-person Trustee Advisory Board that consist of Phil Ellis, Brandy Brewer, and Shirley Bell.

== Geography ==
According to the 2010 census, the township has a total area of 26.88 square miles (69.6 km^{2}), of which 26.57 square miles (68.8 km^{2}) (or 98.85%) is land and 0.31 square miles (0.80 km^{2}) (or 1.15%) is water. Brick House Pond and Silver Lakes are in this township.

=== Cities and towns ===
- Clarksville (east three-quarters)
- Jeffersonville (west three-quarters)
- Oak Park (west three-quarters)

=== Unincorporated towns ===
- Arctic Springs
- Blackiston Village
- Cementville
- Port Fulton

(This list is based on USGS data and may include former settlements.)

=== Adjacent townships ===
- Silver Creek Township (north)
- Utica Township (northeast)
- New Albany Township, Floyd County (west)

=== Major highways ===
- Interstate 65
- Interstate 265
- U.S. Route 31
- State Road 3
- State Road 60
- State Road 131

=== Cemeteries ===
The township contains several cemeteries: Applegate, Civil War, Eastern (aka Chestnut Grove Cemetery), Espy, Gilmore, Grayson, Hale McBride Family, Lacassagne/Moore, McBride, McClintick, Old City, Mulberry Street and Chestnut/Market Street, St. Anthony's, Stewart, and Walnut Ridge.
