= Greater Clark County Schools =

School district in Indiana, United States

Location
- Southern and Eastern Clark County, Indiana, specifically Jeffersonville, Utica, Charlestown, New Washington, and parts of Clarksville United States

District information
- Type: Public
- Grades: Pre-K through 12
- Superintendent: Mark Laughner

Students and staff
- Students: Approx. 10,533

Other information
- Website: www.gccschools.com

Greater Clark County Schools is a public school district serving sections of Clark County, Indiana. The district is the largest in the county, out of four, and one of the largest in southern Indiana. The district operates 17 schools located in Jeffersonville, Utica, Charlestown, New Washington, and Clarksville. The current superintendent is Mark Laughner.

== Administration ==
The corporation is led by a superintendent, who oversees the day-to-day operation of the district and is appointed by the school board; the board, elected at large in the district's service area, has responsibility for fiscal matters, hiring, firing, and other responsibilities. School board elections are non-partisan, and members serve four year terms.

A number of programs and departments fall under the superintendent's direction. They are:

- Advanced Program
- Auxiliary Services
- Business Department
- Clark County Special Education Co-Op
- Curriculum and Instruction
- Educational Foundation
- Food Services
- General Counsel
- Health Services
- Human Resources
- Student Services
- Technology Services
- Transportation

== Schools ==
As of 2026, GCCS operates a total of 17 schools, including eight elementary schools, four middle schools, three high schools, and two alternative schools. Two of the middle and high schools are combined into one building.

=== Elementary schools ===
Name	Location
Charlestown Elementary School	Charlestown
Franklin Square Elementary School	Jeffersonville
New Washington Elementary School	New Washington
Northaven Elementary School	Jeffersonville
Parkwood Elementary School	Clarksville
Pike Elementary School	Jeffersonville
Riverside Elementary School	Jeffersonville
Utica Elementary School	Utica

=== Middle schools ===
Name	Location
Charlestown Middle School	Charlestown
New Washington Middle/High School	New Washington
Parkview Middle School	Jeffersonville
River Valley Middle School	Jeffersonville

=== High schools ===
Name	Location
Charlestown High School	Charlestown
Jeffersonville High School	Jeffersonville
New Washington Middle/High School	New Washington

=== Alternative schools ===
Name	Location
Corden Porter School	Jeffersonville
Greater Clark Virtual Academy	Jeffersonville

One school in the district's service area, Sacred Heart School in Jeffersonville, is operated by the Archdiocese of Indianapolis. Students in Clarksville attend either GCCS or Clarksville Community School Corporation, depending on the section of the town they live in. All high school juniors and seniors can attend the Prosser Career Education Center, located in nearby New Albany and operated by New Albany-Floyd County Schools.

Most of the district's auxiliary and administrative buildings are located in Jeffersonville.

== Statistics ==
As of the 2012–2013 school year, the overall graduation rate for GCCS was 90.2%, above the state average. 58.1% of students received free or reduced lunch, above the state average.

== Athletics ==
School athletics are largely overseen at the individual school level. Charlestown High School is a part of the Indiana High School Athletic Association Mid-Southern Conference, and is Class 3A except for the soccer teams, which are Class 2A; Jeffersonville High School is part of the Hoosier Hills Conference, and is in Class 4A except for football, which is Class 6A, and the soccer teams, which are Class 2A, and New Washington Middle/High School is part of the Southern Athletic Conference and is class A; football and soccer are not part of New Washington's athletic offerings.

Jeffersonville High School won the 1992-1993 boys' basketball, 2010-2011 girls' 4A basketball, 2024–25 boys' 4A basketball, 1974-1975 and 1976-1977 girls' track championships.
