= Charlestown High School (Indiana) =

Public high school in Charlestown, Indiana, US

Location
- 1 Pirate Place; Charlestown, Clark County, Indiana 47111; United States
- Coordinates: 38°27′17″N 85°39′59″W

Information
- Type: Public
- Established: 1912
- School district: Greater Clark County Schools
- Principal: William Eihusen
- Teaching staff: 49.00 (FTE)
- Grades: 9-12
- Enrollment: 854 (2023–2024)
- Student to teacher ratio: 17.43
- Color
- Athletics: Boys: Baseball, Basketball, Cross Country, Football, Golf, Soccer, Swimming, Tennis, Track, & Wrestling. Girls: Basketball, Cross Country, Golf, Softball, Swimming, Tennis, Track, Wrestling, Volleyball, & Soccer. Non-gender related: Marching Band, Cheerleading
- Athletics conference: Mid-Southern Conference
- Mascot: Pirate
- Website: Official website

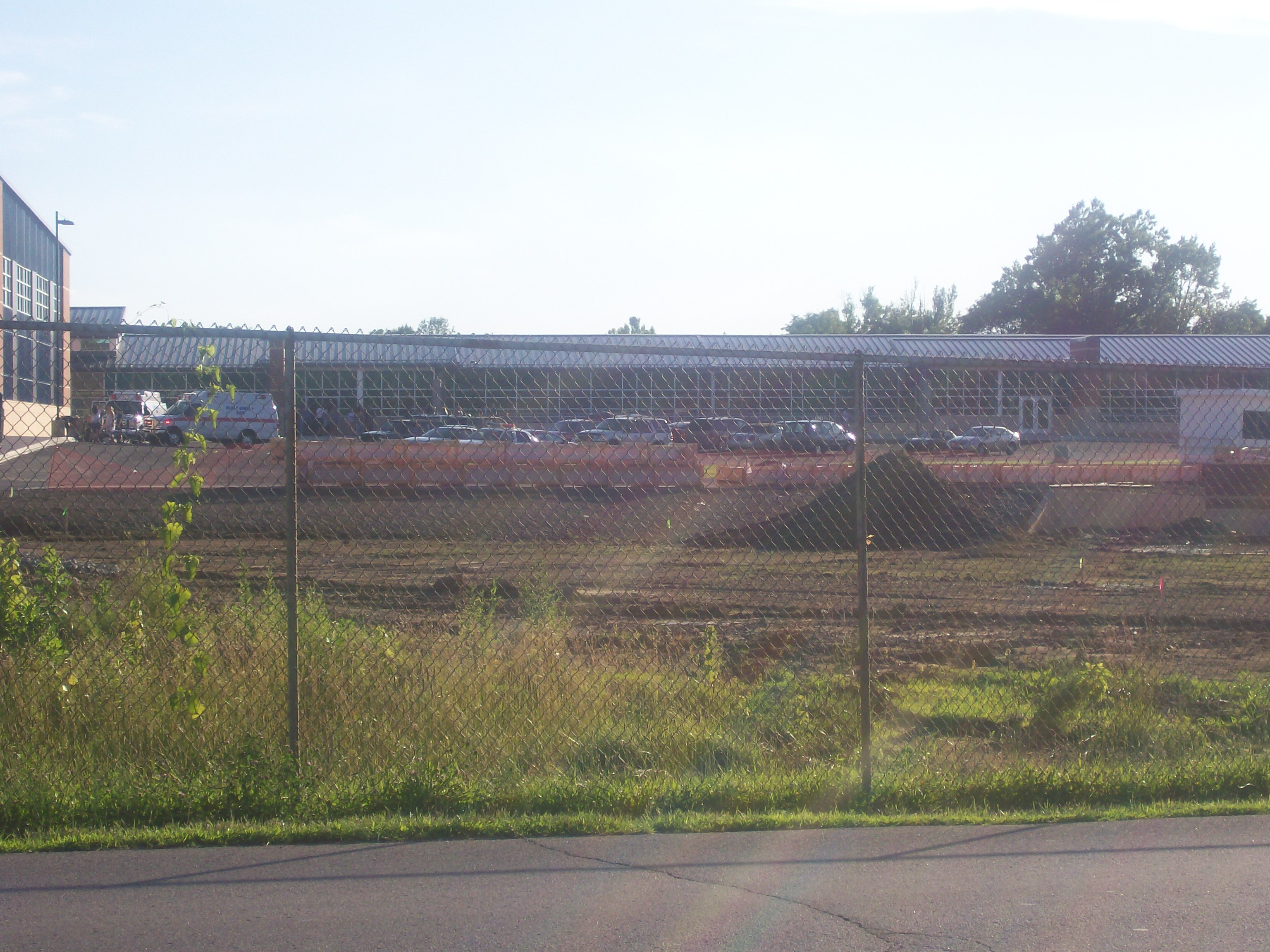
Charlestown High School; under construction on Graduation day 2010.

Charlestown High School is a public high school located in Charlestown, Indiana. The school serves students in grades 9 through 12 from Charlestown, Otisco and Marysville. The current principal is William Eihusen.

== History ==
On November 14, 2006, the Greater Clark County Schools board voted 7–0 to build a new Charlestown High School. The new school would consist of 100 acres (as opposed to the current building's 30-40 acres) and is intended to educate 900 to over 1000 students. Students were officially allowed into the new Charlestown High School on January 4, 2010. The whole school was expected to be finished by no later than 2011. The last basketball game played in Charlestown High School's Dunn Arena was on February 26, 2010, the arena was 55 years old. It was torn down along with many other parts of the original school for the new schools construction.

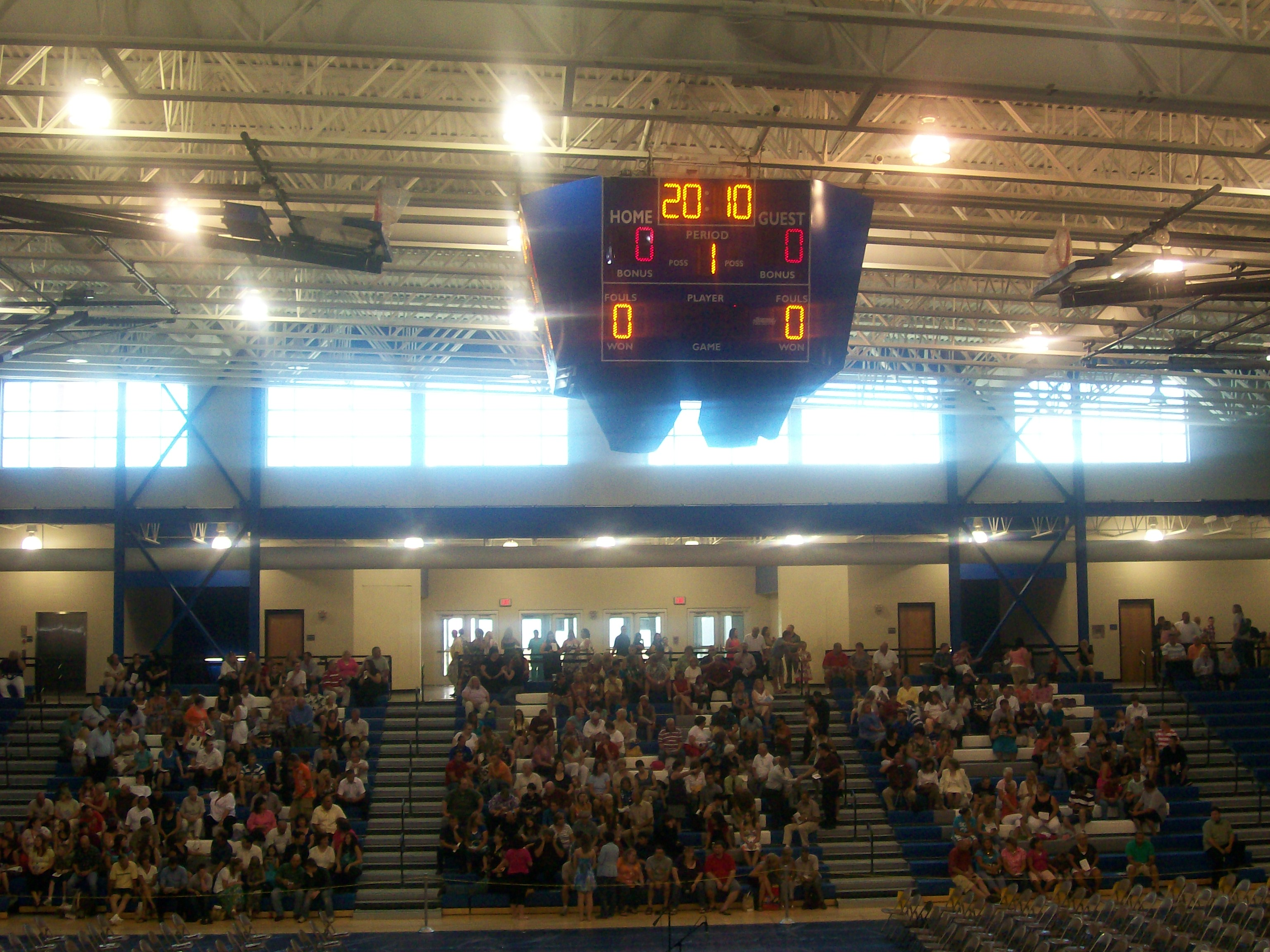
The new Charlestown High School Basketball Arena (interior) on Graduation Day 2010.

The new state-of-the-art facility includes a massive Wireless Internet network, a smart board in every classroom, a new athletic complex, new baseball and softball fields, a much larger cafeteria, a much larger library, and could hold a total of 1050 students. Many of the lights within the school include motion sensors as well. The school also included its own filtration system which is said to have some of the cleanest water in the City of Charlestown. There were also many features that made the school energy efficient. The school officially held its 'Dedication Ceremony' and allowed tours of the new high school to the public on October 31, 2010, and the new high school was almost 100% complete at that time. Many people who had gone to the school when it was originally built, back in the mid-1950s, attended the event and were quite pleased with all of the changes made within the school.

== One to One Initiative ==
On November 3, 2010, the school began its one-to-one computer initiative, where every student in the school was issued an Apple MacBook computer to be used during school. Students also had the choice to take the laptops home if they paid the insurance for them. Students on free or reduced lunch got lower costs on insurance as well. Soon after, Charlestown Middle School used this program in their classrooms.

After the initiative was launched, there were many notable changes in the school's curriculum. There were many new technology courses offered as well as certifications. Many students changed from using text books in every class to using online textbooks and teachers began to use digital copies of assignments and study guides within their classrooms. A notable thing for the 2010 School Year was that the graduation rate went up a substantial amount, to almost 80%. College application rates went up as well. Though this could have also had a bit to do with the new lesson plans and initiatives teachers implemented within the school.

Since 2012, neither Charlestown High School or Charlestown Middle School continued with the use of the Apple MacBook computer, selling most of the ones that weren't damaged. This is expected to be the end of the One to One Initiative. However, Greater Clark County Schools has since adopted the program and distribute Chromebooks every year since the 2013–2014 school year. Over 90% of Charlestown's Seniors had applied to college, been accepted into a vocational program or enlisted to a military branch.

== Notable alumni ==
- Steve Hamilton: Former MLB player for the Cleveland Indians, Washington Senators, New York Yankees, Chicago White Sox, San Francisco Giants, Chicago Cubs, as well as a former NBA player for the Minneapolis Lakers.
- Mickie Knuckles: Professional wrestler formerly signed to Impact Wrestling

== See also ==
- List of high schools in Indiana
- Mid-Southern Conference
