= Union Township, Clark County, Indiana =

Union Township
- Township
- Location of Union Township in Clark County
- Coordinates: 38°28′26″N 85°46′01″W
- Country: United States
- State: Indiana
- County: Clark

Government
  - Type: Indiana township

Area
  - Total: 21.08 sq mi (54.6 km^{2})
  - Land: 20.85 sq mi (54.0 km^{2})
  - Water: 0.23 sq mi (0.60 km^{2})
- Elevation: 512 ft (156 m)

Population (2020)
  - Total: 4,552
  - Density: 168.2/sq mi (64.9/km^{2})
- FIPS code: 18-77174
- GNIS feature ID: 453909

Union Township is one of twelve townships in Clark County, Indiana, United States. As of the 2010 census, its population was 3,507 and it contained 1,415 housing units.

== History ==
Union Township was organized in 1858. Its name was given from the fact that this township was created through the merger or "union" of land given by three neighboring townships.

== Geography ==
According to the 2010 census, the township has a total area of 21.08 square miles (54.6 km^{2}), of which 20.85 square miles (54.0 km^{2}) (or 98.91%) is land and 0.23 square miles (0.60 km^{2}) (or 1.09%) is water.

=== Cities and towns ===
- Memphis

=== Unincorporated towns ===
(This list is based on USGS data and may include former settlements.)

=== Adjacent townships ===
- Monroe Township (north)
- Charlestown Township (east)
- Silver Creek Township (south)
- Carr Township (southwest)

=== Major highways ===
- Interstate 65
- U.S. Route 31

=== Cemeteries ===
The township contains three cemeteries: Black and White (aka Weir or Wilson), Bowery, Ebenezer Methodist Episcopal Church.
