= Bottorff–McCulloch Farm =

- U.S. National Register of Historic Places
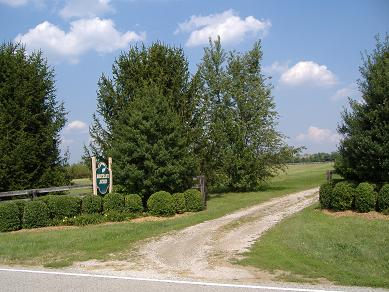
- Entrance to property

- Location within Clark County, Indiana Location within Indiana Location within the United States
- Location: 6702 Bethany Rd., southwest of Charlestown, Charlestown Township, Clark County, Indiana
- Coordinates: 38°24′53″N 85°41′14″W
- Area: 17 acres (6.9 ha)
- Built: 1835
- Architectural style: Greek Revival, English Barn
- NRHP reference No.: 95000699
- Added to NRHP: June 9, 1995

The Bottorff–McCulloch Farm is a historic home and farm located in Charlestown Township, Clark County, Indiana. The farmhouse was built about 1835, and is a two-story, Greek Revival style brick dwelling. It has a gable roof and sits on a coursed stone foundation. It features a one-story portico. Also on the property are the contributing summer kitchen, two English barns, a three-portal barn, two silos, and a milk house.

It was listed on the National Register of Historic Places in 1995.
