= Utica Township, Clark County, Indiana =

Utica Township
- Township
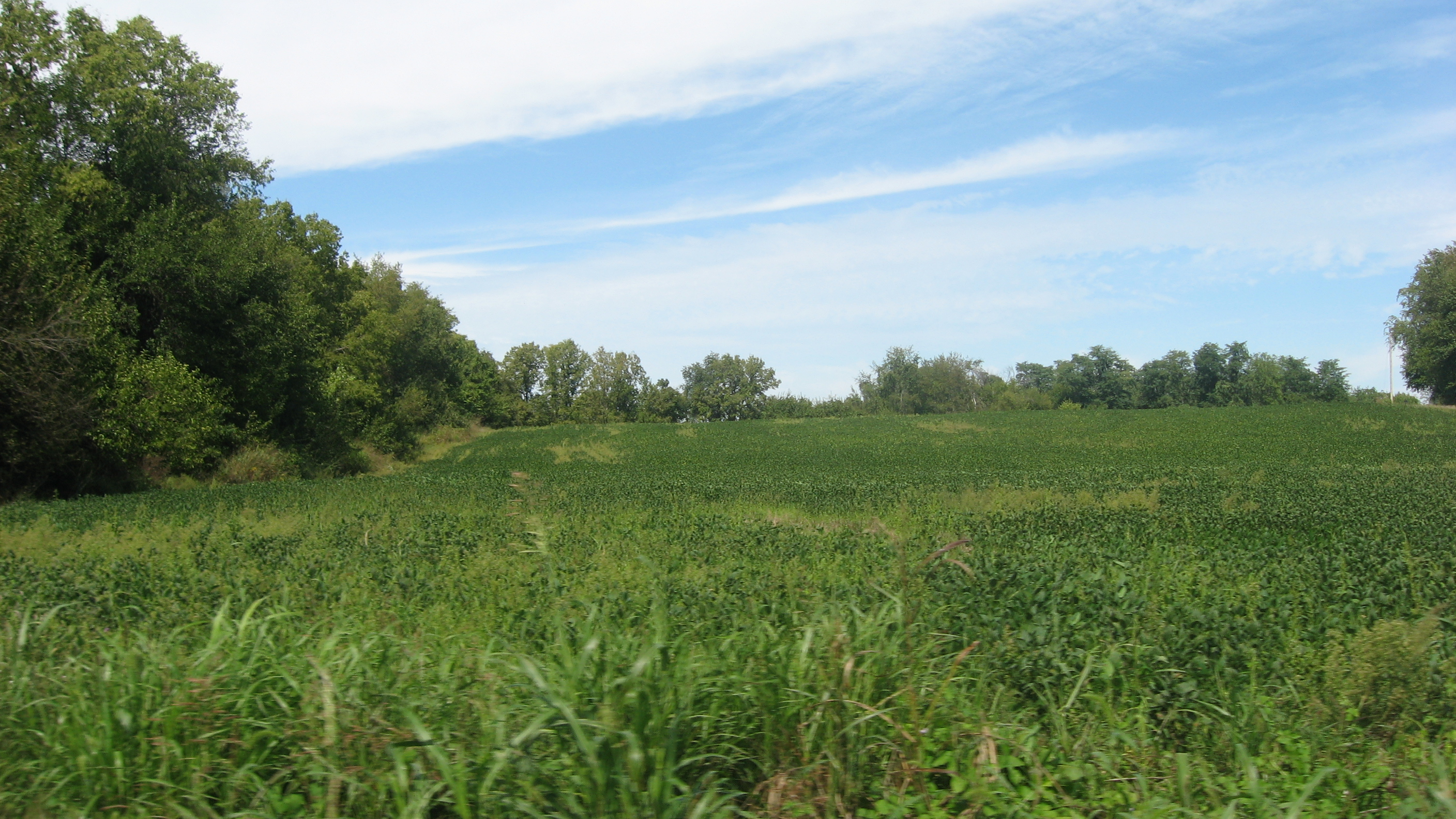
- Countryside in the township

- Location of Utica Township in Clark County
- Coordinates: 38°21′30″N 85°40′29″W
- Country: United States
- State: Indiana
- County: Clark

Government
  - Type: Indiana township

Area
  - Total: 2.01 sq mi (5.2 km^{2})
  - Land: 2.64 sq mi (6.8 km^{2})
  - Water: 0.36 sq mi (0.93 km^{2})
- Elevation: 548 ft (167 m)

Population (2020)
  - Total: 866
  - Density: 278/sq mi (107/km^{2})
- FIPS code: 18-78128
- GNIS feature ID: 453941

Utica Township is one of twelve townships in Clark County, Indiana. As of the 2020 U.S. census, its population was 8,158 and it contained 3,324 housing units.

== History ==
Utica Township was organized in 1831. It was named after the town of Utica, Indiana.

== Geography ==
According to the 2010 census, the township has a total area of 22.01 square miles (57.0 km^{2}), of which 21.64 square miles (56.0 km^{2}) (or 98.32%) is land and 0.36 square miles (0.93 km^{2}) (or 1.64%) is water.

=== Cities and towns ===
- Jeffersonville (northeast quarter)
- Utica

=== Unincorporated towns ===
- Longview Beach
- Prather
- River Ridge
- Watson

(This list is based on USGS data and may include former settlements.)

=== Adjacent townships ===
- Charlestown Township (north)
- Jeffersonville Township (southwest)
- Silver Creek Township (west)

=== Major highways ===
- Interstate 265
- Indiana State Road 3
- Indiana State Road 62

=== Cemeteries ===
The township contains many cemeteries: Adams Family, Barnett (aka Adams Cemetery), Briar Hill, Burtt, Friend (aka Dailey), Hillcrest, Koonz Cemetery, Lentz Family, Lentz Heirs, New Chapel, Queen of Heaven, Smith, Stacy, Union, Utica, and Washington.
