= Watson, Indiana =

Unincorporated community in Indiana, United States

Watson
- Unincorporated community
- Clark County's location in Indiana

- Location in Clark County
- Coordinates: 38°20′55″N 85°42′00″W
- Country: United States
- State: Indiana
- County: Clark
- Township: Utica
- Elevation: 515 ft (157 m)
- FIPS code: 18-81404
- GNIS feature ID: 445551

Watson is an unincorporated community in Utica Township, Clark County, Indiana.

== History ==
A post office was established at Watson in 1872, and remained in operation until it was discontinued in 1928. Watson was laid out as a town in 1876.
