= Cementville, Indiana =

Unincorporated community in Indiana, United States

Cementville
- Unincorporated community
- Clark County's location in Indiana

- Location in Clark County
- Coordinates: 38°20′59″N 85°44′46″W
- Country: United States
- State: Indiana
- County: Clark
- Township: Jeffersonville
- Elevation: 466 ft (142 m)
- ZIP code: 47130
- FIPS code: 18-11170
- GNIS feature ID: 432295

Cementville is an unincorporated community in Jeffersonville Township, Clark County, Indiana.

== History ==
A post office was established at Cementville in 1869, and remained in operation until it was discontinued in 1904. Production of cement in the area caused the name to be selected.
