= Thomas Downs House =

Historic house in Indiana, United States

- U.S. National Register of Historic Places
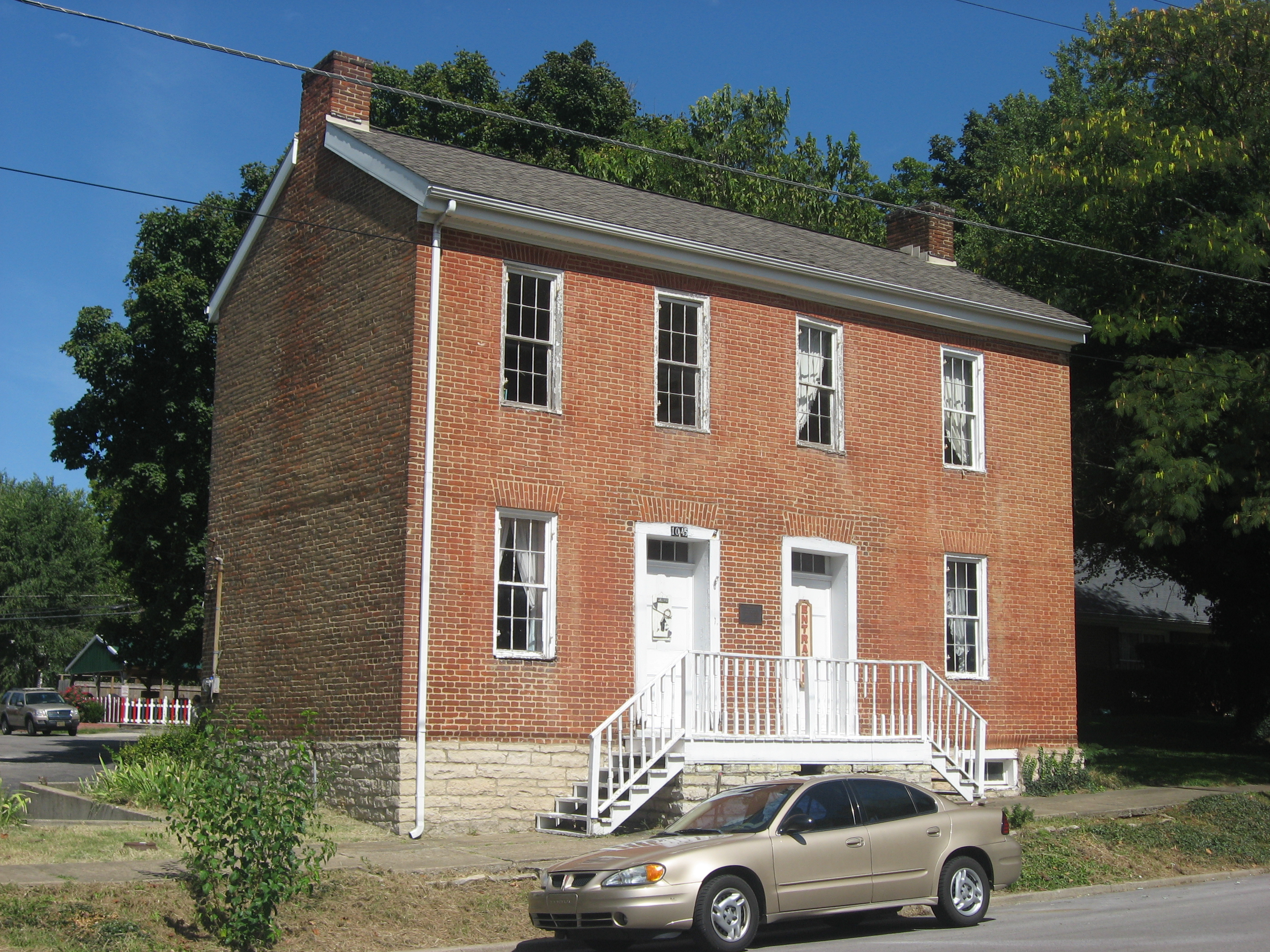

- Location within Clark County, Indiana Location within Indiana Location within the United States
- Location: 1045 Main St., Charlestown, Indiana
- Coordinates: 38°26′40″N 85°39′35″W
- Area: less than one acre
- Built: c. 1809
- Architectural style: Federal
- NRHP reference No.: 84000490
- Added to NRHP: December 6, 1984

The Thomas Downs House is a historic home located just east of Charlestown, Indiana's town square. It was built about 1809 and is a two-story, four-bay, Federal style brick dwelling. It has a gable roof, sits on a stone foundation, and has a one-story rear ell. Thomas Downs was a politician from Charlestown that was Clark County's first county treasurer. He would later serve as an Indiana Territory legislator. It is owned by the Clark's Grant Historical Society, who has a museum there but offers tours by reservation only.

It was listed on the National Register of Historic Places in 1984.
