= Richard B. Wathen =

American politician, journalist, and author

Richard B. Wathen (June 26, 1917 – March 14, 2001) was an American politician, journalist, and author. He was a Republican member of the Indiana House of Representatives between 1973 and 1990.

== Early life and career ==
Wathen was born in Jeffersonville, Indiana. He comes from a family of Kentucky Bourbon makers. His father, Otho H. Wathen, President of American Medicinal Spirits Company, and his brother, Otho H. Wathen Jr., were in the distilling business. He attended Princeton University. He received his law degree from Indiana University in 1942 and was admitted to the Indiana Bar. As World War II went on, he joined the United States Navy as an officer serving on the aircraft carrier Guadalcanal (CVE-60). He was part of the party that captured German submarine U-505 on June 4, 1944, and received a Presidential Unit Citation. He later rose to the rank of Commander.

While serving his country took Wathen away from home for many years, including a lot of time in Washington, upon his father's death in 1964, Wathen returned home to Jeffersonville, Indiana, where he practiced law for many years. In addition to serving in the Indiana House of Representatives, Wathen once challenged Congressman Lee H. Hamilton but was not successful.

== Personal life ==
Wathen had three children, one of whom also became an attorney. One of his seven grandchildren, Alexander B. Wathen, also followed the family calling and currently practices law in Texas. One of Wathen's sons and grandchildren also served in the military.

== Death ==
Wathen died on March 14, 2001, from throat cancer after a few months of illness.

== Authored books ==
- Cliffs of Fall (1958) (New Orleans, Publications Press) PS3545.A81 C6, PZ4.W333 Cl
- The Only Yankee (1970) (Chicago, Regnery Publishing) 73-124731
- Wathen's Law: The Hang-Ups of a Politician (1981) (Chicago, Regnery Publishing) ISBN 0-89526-891-4
- Legislative history of Clark County, 1972-84 (1984) JS451.I69 C55 1984
