= New Market, Clark County, Indiana =

Unincorporated community in Indiana, U.S.

Coordinates: 38°32′08″N 85°37′01″W

New Market is an unincorporated community in Clark County, Indiana, in the United States.

== History ==
New Market was originally called Oregon, and under the latter name was established in 1839. A post office called Oregon operated from 1846 until 1910.
