= Watson House (Charlestown, Indiana) =

Historic house in Indiana, United States

- U.S. National Register of Historic Places
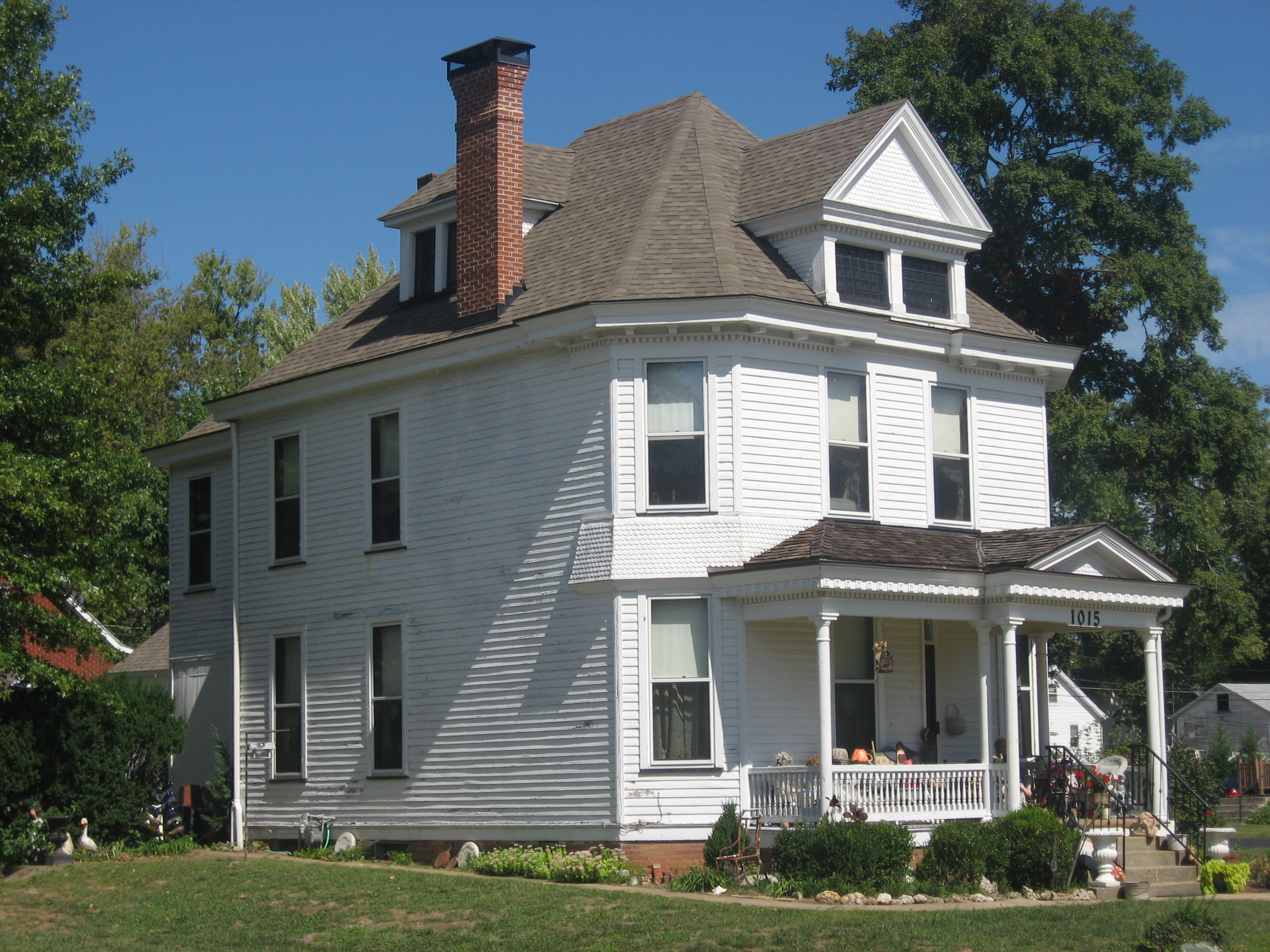

- Location within Clark County, Indiana Location within Indiana Location within the United States
- Location: 1015 Water St., Charlestown, Indiana
- Coordinates: 38°26′43″N 85°39′39″W
- Area: less than one acre
- Built: c. 1900
- Architectural style: Colonial Revival, Queen Anne
- NRHP reference No.: 83000051
- Added to NRHP: September 1, 1983

The Watson House, also known as the Coombs House, is a historic home located just east of Charlestown, Indiana's town square. It was built about 1900, and is a two-story, rectangular frame dwelling with Queen Anne and Colonial Revival style design elements. It features a full-width front porch supported by slender columns. Originally located on the site was the James Bigger-built Green Tree Tavern (1812), where Jonathan Jennings, the first governor of Indiana, was given an Inaugural Ball in 1816.

It was added to the National Register of Historic Places in 1983.
