= Springville, Clark County, Indiana =

Unincorporated community in Indiana, United States

Coordinates: 38°25′16″N 85°41′00″W

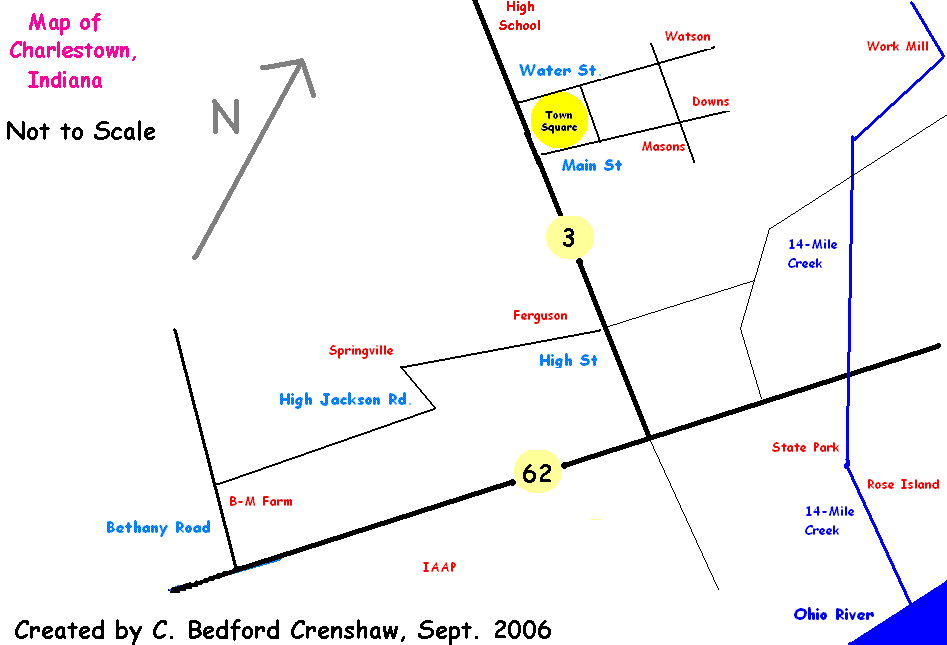
Map of Charlestown, with Springville shown in the center.

Springville was a small town that existed from 1798 to 1811 in Charlestown Township, Clark County, Indiana, United States. It was named for the springs in the area that provided a good freshwater supply.

== Origin ==
A Frenchman established a trading post at the site in 1799; Indians called it Tullytown due to the prominent trader Charles Tully (pronounced two-lay). It was located at the intersection of four Indian trails, two of which went to what is now Detroit, Michigan and Cincinnati, Ohio.

== Features ==
At Springville's peak, it had 100 residents. A simple grid of streets, four north–south, and three east–west, named for trees, divided Springville. Among the trades represented in the village were blacksmithing, a distillery, a doctor, hattery, surveying, and a wheelwright. Jonathan Jennings made whiskey and had a mill at Springville during his brief residence. When Clark County was established, Springville was named the county seat on April 7, 1801, creating the first court in the county.

== Decline ==
On June 9, 1802, the county seat was moved to Jeffersonville, starting the demise of Springville. In 1808, Charlestown was established a mile northeast of Springville and was seen as a preferable town to live in as Springville was considered decadent, due to how Indians would become intoxicated after trading at Springville. Also, there were several disputes about ownership in the town that went for eight years and spawned several court trials. Springville could not handle the competition for residents with Charlestown and by 1812 the settlement had been abandoned.

== Today ==
A historical marker denotes its former location today, and three separate farms contain the land which was once Springville. There are Springvilles still in existence in LaPorte County, Indiana, and Lawrence County, Indiana, although both have fewer residents than the peak population in Clark County's Springville.
