= Otisco, Indiana =

Unincorporated community in Indiana, United States

Otisco
- Unincorporated community and Census-designated place
- Clark County's location in Indiana

- Location in Clark County
- Coordinates: 38°32′34″N 85°39′58″W
- Country: United States
- State: Indiana
- County: Clark
- Township: Oregon
- Elevation: 673 ft (205 m)
- ZIP code: 47163
- FIPS code: 18-57222
- GNIS feature ID: 2830332

Otisco is an unincorporated community in Charlestown Township, Clark County, Indiana.

== History ==
Otisco was laid out in 1854 when the railroad was extended to that point. According to one source, the name might be borrowed from New York's Otisco Lake.

The Otisco post office was established in 1870.

== Geography ==
Otisco is located along Indiana State Road 3 in the northern corner of Charlestown Township. The northern fringe of the town extends into neighboring Oregon Township.

== Demographics ==
The United States Census Bureau defined Otisco as a census designated place in the 2022 American Community Survey.
