= Clark County, Indiana =

County in Indiana, United States

- County
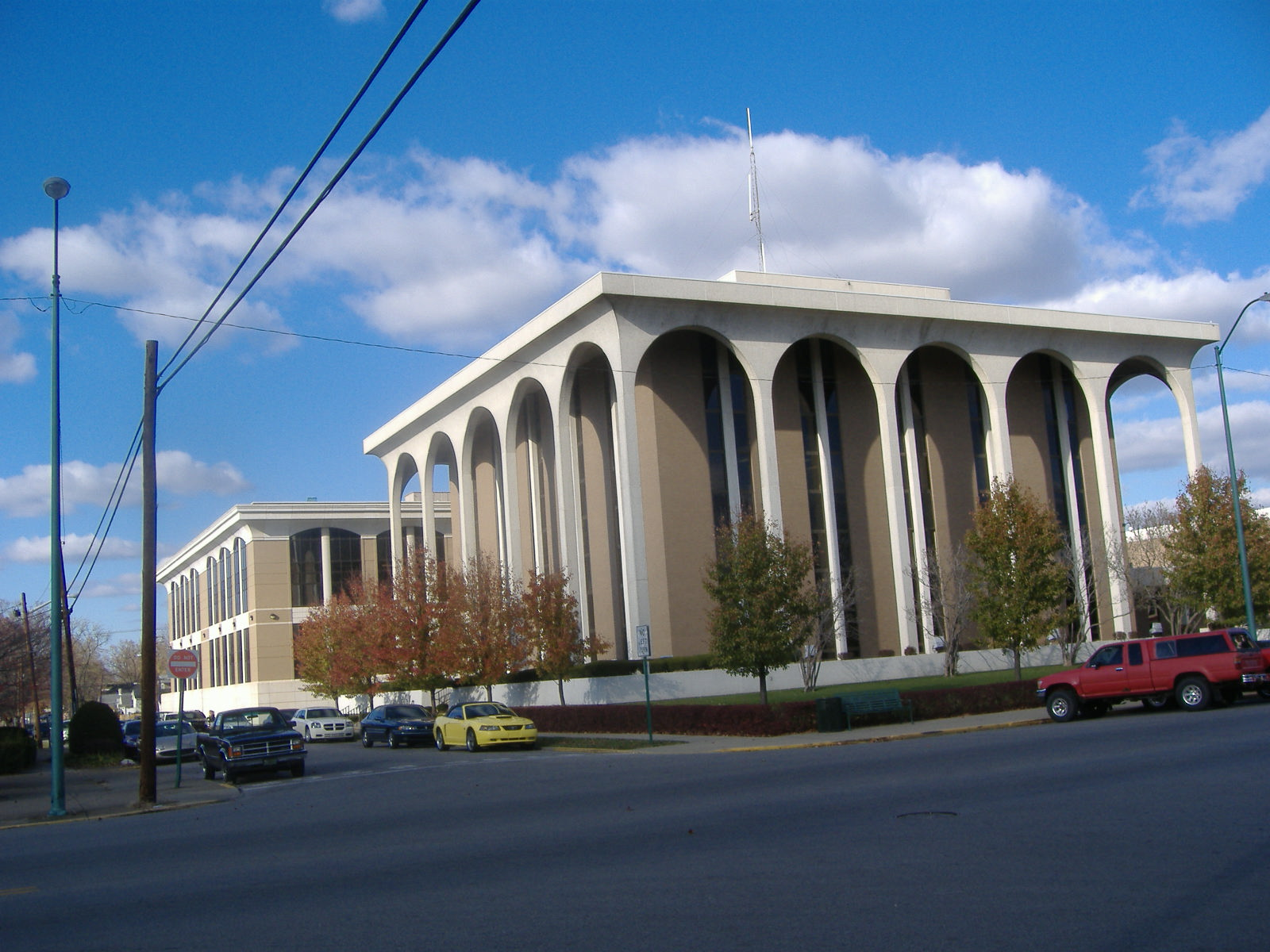
- Clark County Courthouse in Jeffersonville, Indiana

- Flag

- Location within the U.S. state of Indiana
- Coordinates: 38°29′N 85°43′W
- Country: United States
- State: Indiana
- Founded: February 3, 1801
- Named for: General George Rogers Clark
- Seat: Jeffersonville
- Largest city: Jeffersonville

Area
  - Total: 376.45 sq mi (975.0 km^{2})
  - Land: 372.86 sq mi (965.7 km^{2})
  - Water: 3.60 sq mi (9.3 km^{2}) 0.96%

Population (2020)
  - Total: 121,093
  - Estimate (2025): 130,451 ▲
  - Density: 324.77/sq mi (125.39/km^{2})
- Time zone: UTC−5 (Eastern)
  - Summer (DST): UTC−4 (EDT)
- Congressional district: 9th
- Website: www.co.clark.in.us
- Indiana county number 10; Second oldest county in Indiana

Clark County is a county in the U.S. state of Indiana, located directly across the Ohio River from Louisville, Kentucky. At the 2020 census, the population was 121,093. The county seat is Jeffersonville. Clark County is part of the Louisville/Jefferson County, KY–IN Metropolitan Statistical Area.

== History ==
Clark County lies on the north bank of the Ohio River. A significant gateway to the state of Indiana, Clark County's settlement began in 1783. The state of Virginia rewarded General George Rogers Clark and his regiment for their victorious capture of Forts Kaskaskia, Cahokia, and Vincennes from the British, by granting them 150,000 acres (610 km^{2}) of land. A small portion of this land, 1,000 acres (4.0 km^{2}), became known as Clarksville, the first authorized American settlement in the Northwest Territory, founded the next year in 1784.

Clark County was formed on February 3, 1801, with territory annexed from Knox, the first county formed in the Territory in 1790. This original area in Clark County was subsequently altered and reduced with the formation of other counties: Harrison (1808), Franklin, Jefferson, and Wayne (1811), Switzerland and Washington (1814), Jackson and Ripley (1816), Jennings (1817), Crawford and Randolph (1818), Fayette and Floyd (1819), Scott (1820), Union (1821), Decatur and Rush (1822).

The first county seat was established in Springville, on April 7, 1801. Jeffersonville was platted in 1802, and on June 9 the Territorial Governor (William Henry Harrison) ordered that it be regarded as the county seat. However, on December 14, 1810, the seat designation was given to Charlestown, which retained the designation until 1873, when on September 23 the Jefforsonville mayor (Luther Warder) successfully campaigned for the county seat's return.

Clark County was a hotbed for antislavery sentiment during the territorial period. In 1807, citizens petitioned Congress to uphold the legal prohibition of slavery established in the Northwest Ordinance in response to efforts by Harrison and his supporters to have the prohibition repealed. Many settlers were Quakers who had migrated from North Carolina to escape the oppressive conditions of the slave states and did not want to see slavery be established in Indiana.

From its beginning Clark County's history, culture and growth have been linked to the development of the river. Early nineteenth-century steamboats transported goods to the upper Ohio, providing opportunities for commercial and industrial growth in the county. In 1832, James Howard founded the Howard shipyards making Clark County a leader in shipbuilding.

The railroad brought further economic growth. The Monon line spanned from New Albany to Chicago, and the Jeffersonville, Madison, and Indianapolis Railroad provided Clark County and southern Indiana with access to the northern trading centers of Indianapolis and Chicago.

Industries locating to Clark County during the nineteenth century included the Louisville Cement Company in Speed, Indiana and the Ford Plate Glass Company established in Jeffersonville in 1876.

During the 1920s, Clark County attracted the Colgate-Palmolive Company to the Clarksville Riverfront. Colgate purchased the former Indiana Reformatory building in 1923. The company rehabilitated and adapted the building for its dedication in 1924. It stayed in business until early 2008.

During World War II the county prospered. The federal government began the Indiana Arsenal near Charlestown in 1940. Producing smokeless powder for the war effort, the arsenal employed up to 20,000. Howard shipyards was commissioned by the Navy to produce landing craft. Later Howard shipyards reorganized as Jeffersonville Boat and Machine Company (Jeffboat) — a current major employer (1991).

When the war ended, the county experienced significant residential and commercial growth, aided by the 1956 Interstate Act. The improved access provided by Interstate 65 encouraged additional subdivisions and shopping centers.

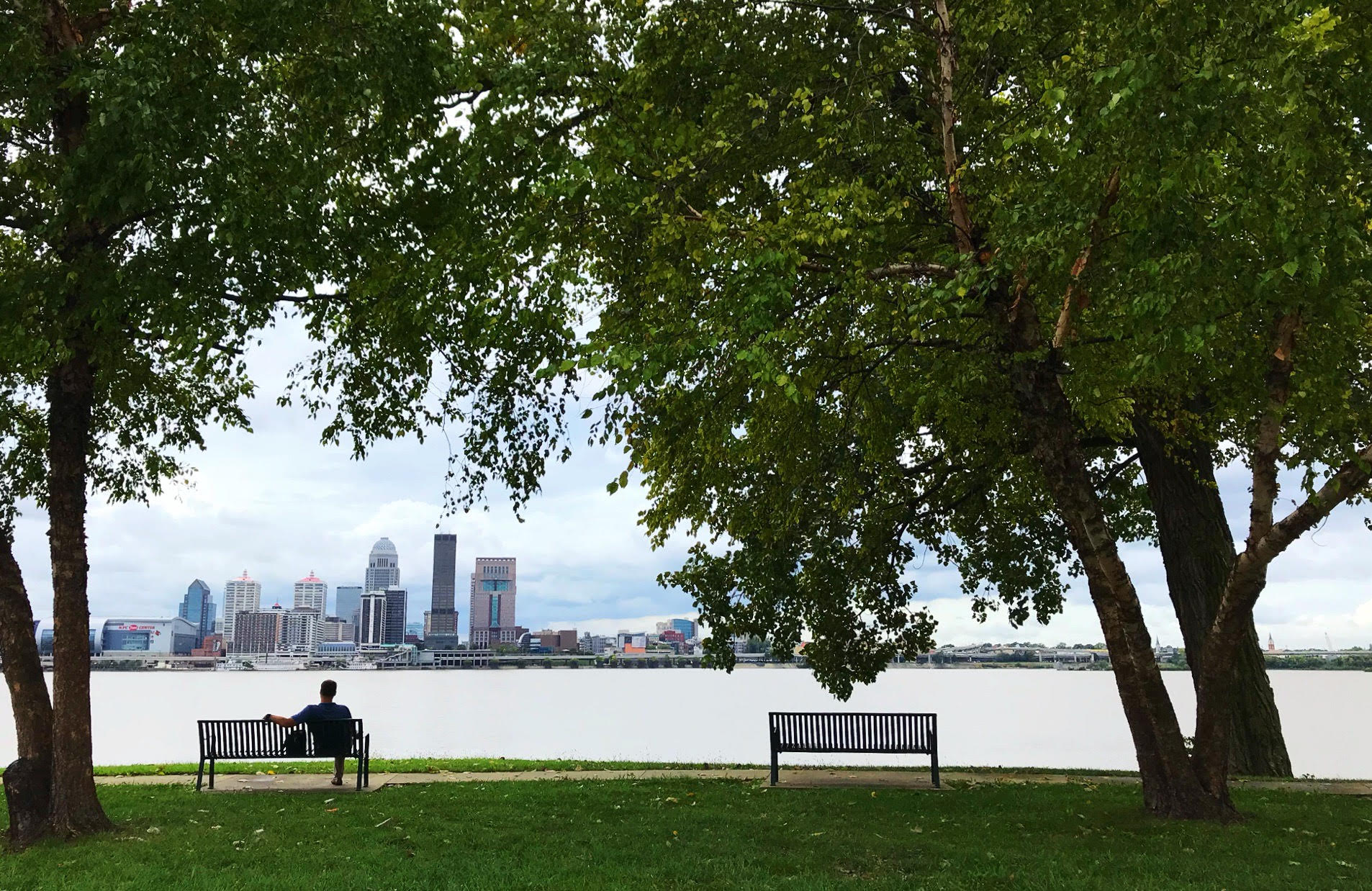
View of Louisville from Clarksville

Clark County history has been closely associated with the development of the Ohio River. From its beginnings, Clark County relied on the river for economic opportunities. Clark County has diversified its economic base, lessened its dependency on the river, and continues to develop in new directions. However, the county still looks to the river as one link to its significant pioneer heritage.

== Geography ==
Clark County lies on the east edge of Indiana; its eastern border abuts the northern border of the state of Kentucky (across the Ohio River). The terrain is low rolling hills, with the area either devoted to agriculture or urban development. The west part of the county is carved with drainages. The highest point on the terrain is a ridge WNW of Henryville near the border with Scott County, at 1,030 ft (310 m) ASL.

According to the 2010 census, the county has a total area of 376.45 square miles (975.0 km^{2}), of which 372.86 square miles (965.7 km^{2}) (or 99.05%) is land and 3.60 square miles (9.3 km^{2}) (or 0.96%) is water.

=== Adjacent counties ===
- Scott County - north
- Jefferson County – northeast
- Trimble County, Kentucky – northeast
- Oldham County, Kentucky – east
- Jefferson County, Kentucky – south
- Floyd County – southwest
- Washington County – west

Clark County is one of the few counties in the US to border two counties of the same name in different states (Jefferson County Indiana and Kentucky)-

=== Cities ===
- Charlestown
- Jeffersonville

=== Towns ===
- Borden
- Clarksville
- Sellersburg
- Utica

=== Census-designated places ===
- Henryville
- Memphis
- New Washington

=== Unincorporated places ===
- Arctic Springs
- Belknap
- Bennettsville
- Bethlehem
- Black Diamond
- Blue Lick
- Broom Hill
- Carwood
- Cementville
- Clarke
- Dallas
- Dyeton
- Floyd
- Hamburg
- Haussdale
- Henze
- Hibernia
- Hughes
- Longview Beach
- Marysville
- Nabb
- New Market
- Oak Park
- Otisco
- Otto
- Prairie Crossing
- Prather
- Pulltight
- River Ridge
- Rockford
- Solon
- Speed
- St Joseph Hill
- Starlight
- Sunset Village
- Underwood
- Watson
- Wilson

=== Extinct towns ===
- Andalusia
- Claysburg
- Oregon
- Port Fulton
- Springville

=== Townships ===
- Bethlehem
- Carr
- Charlestown
- Jeffersonville
- Monroe
- Oregon
- Owen
- Silver Creek
- Union
- Utica
- Washington
- Wood

=== Transit ===
- Transit Authority of River City

=== Major highways ===
- I-65
- US 31
- SR 3
- SR 60
- SR 62
- SR 160
- SR 362

=== Airport ===
- KJVY – Clark Regional Airport

== Climate and weather ==
Jeffersonville, Indiana

Climate chart (precipitation, max. and min. temperature)
J	F	M	A	M	J	J	A	S	O	N	D
3.3 41 25	3.3 47 29	4.4 57 37	3.9 67 46	4.9 75 56	3.8 83 65	4.3 87 70	3.4 86 68	3.1 79 61	2.8 68 49	3.8 56 39	3.7 45 30
- █ Average max. and min. temperatures in °F
- █ Precipitation totals in inches
- Source: The Weather Channel
Metric conversion
J	F	M	A	M	J	J	A	S	O	N	D
83 5 −4	83 8 −2	112 14 3	99 19 8	124 24 13	96 28 18	109 31 21	87 30 20	77 26 16	71 20 9	97 13 4	94 7 −1
- █ Average max. and min. temperatures in °C
- █ Precipitation totals in mm

In recent years, average temperatures in Jeffersonville have ranged from a low of 25 °F (−4 °C) in January to a high of 87 °F (31 °C) in July, although a record low of −22 °F (−30 °C) was recorded in January 1994 and a record high of 107 °F (42 °C) was recorded in July 1936. Average monthly precipitation ranged from 2.79 inches (71 mm) in October to 4.88 inches (124 mm) in May.

Two towns in Clark County, Marysville and Henryville suffered major damage during the tornado outbreak of March 2–3, 2012.

== Government ==
For most of its history, Clark County was a Democratic-leaning county, its politics more in line with neighboring Kentucky than Indiana. However, the county voted for the national winner in all but 2 elections from 1924 to 2004 (1952, 1968). Since the start of the second millennium, the county has trended strongly Republican, moving away from its previous near-bellwether status.

The county government is a constitutional body, and is granted specific powers by the Constitution of Indiana, and by the Indiana Code.

County Council

The seven-member county council is the legislative branch of the county government and controls all the spending and revenue collection in the county. Four representatives are elected from county districts, and three are elected at large. The council members serve four-year terms. They are responsible for setting salaries, the annual budget, and special spending. The council also has limited authority to impose local taxes, in the form of an income and property tax that is subject to state level approval, excise taxes, and service taxes.

Board of Commissioners

The executive body of the county is made of a board of commissioners. The commissioners are elected county-wide, in staggered terms, and each serves a four-year term. One of the commissioners, typically the most senior, serves as president. The commissioners are charged with executing the acts legislated by the council, collecting revenue, and managing the day-to-day functions of the county government.

Courts

The Clark County Judicial System consists of 8 Courts:

- Clark Circuit Court (Judge Daniel Moore)
- Clark Superior Court #1 (Judge Vicki Carmichael)
- Clark Superior Court #2 (Judge Jerome Jacobi)
- Clark Superior Court #3 (Judge Joe P. Weber)
- Jeffersonville City Court – Office Expired December 31, 2015
- Charlestown City Court (Judge George Waters)
- Clarksville Town Court (Judge Samuel Gwin)
- Sellersburg Town Court (Judge Thomas Lowe)

By statute, the Circuit and Superior Courts have unlimited jurisdiction with the power to hear civil and criminal cases. City and Town Courts have jurisdiction to hear Ordinance violations and misdemeanor prosecutions, as well as civil actions where the amount in controversy does not exceed five hundred dollars ($500). Judgments in the City and Town Courts may be appealed de novo to the Clark Circuit Court. In addition, Clark Superior Court #3 maintains a Small Claims Docket. Local Rules of Practice may also limit the ability of a Court to hear certain cases. Judgments in other Courts may be appealed to the Indiana Court of appeals or the Indiana Supreme Court.

The Circuit and Superior Court Judges are assisted by 3 Magistrates, who are appointed and serve at the direction of the elected Judges.

The Circuit and Superior Court Judges are elected on a partisan basis, must reside within the county, and serve six-year terms. The City and Town Court Judges are elected to four-year terms on a partisan basis, and must reside within the City/Town.

Felony and Misdemeanor prosecutions are filed by the Prosecuting Attorney, who is elected on a partisan basis, must reside within the county, and serves a term of four years. The current Prosecuting Attorney, Steven D. Stewart, has been in Office since 1989.

County officials

The county has several other elected offices, including prosecuting attorney, sheriff, coroner, auditor, treasurer, recorder, surveyor, and circuit court clerk. These officers are elected to four-year terms. Members elected to county government positions must declare a party affiliation and be residents of the county.

=== Elected county officials ===
Clark County is part of Indiana's 9th congressional district and is represented in Congress by Republican Erin Houchin.; Indiana Senate districts 45 and 46; and Indiana House of Representatives districts 66, 70, 71, 72 and 73.

Due to decadal redistricting and the 2022 general election, Clark County is now represented in the Indiana General Assembly by District 45 Senator Chris Garten, District 66 Representative Zach Payne, District 70 Representative Karen Engleman, and District 71 Representative Rita Fleming.

The Clark County Council has 5 elected officials (as of May 2018). The Clark County Council of 2019 includes:

- Barbara Hollis (District 1)
- Janne Newland (District 2)
- Brittney Ferree (District 3)
- Steve Doherty (District 4)
- David Abbott (at-large)
- John Miller (at-large)
- Kevin Vissing (at-large)
- R. Scott Lewis (Attorney)

The three elected Clark County Commissioners are (as of 2019):

- Jack Coffman
- Connie Sellers
- Bryan Glover

Other county office holders as determined by the 2022 general election:

- Prosecutor: Jeremy Mull
- Sheriff: Scottie Maples
- Clerk: Ryan Lynch
- Auditor: Danny Yost
- Treasurer: Monty Snelling
- Recorder: Steve Gill
- Assessor: Butch Love
- Surveyor: David Ruckman

United States presidential election results for Clark County, Indiana
Year	Republican		Democratic		Third party(ies)	
Year	No.	%	No.	%	No.	%
1888	3,206	45.52%	3,788	53.78%	49	0.70%
1892	3,280	44.23%	4,013	54.12%	122	1.65%
1896	3,897	50.23%	3,785	48.79%	76	0.98%
1900	3,855	47.78%	4,134	51.24%	79	0.98%
1904	3,644	48.79%	3,587	48.03%	237	3.17%
1908	3,706	46.56%	4,085	51.33%	168	2.11%
1912	805	11.88%	3,315	48.93%	2,655	39.19%
1916	3,173	46.15%	3,572	51.95%	131	1.91%
1920	6,466	48.41%	6,729	50.38%	162	1.21%
1924	5,944	51.70%	5,218	45.38%	336	2.92%
1928	8,056	56.39%	6,193	43.35%	36	0.25%
1932	5,881	37.89%	9,501	61.21%	140	0.90%
1936	5,536	34.83%	10,116	63.64%	244	1.53%
1940	6,044	40.02%	9,015	59.69%	45	0.30%
1944	7,241	42.39%	9,778	57.24%	62	0.36%
1948	7,001	38.57%	10,953	60.34%	199	1.10%
1952	11,190	48.60%	11,703	50.83%	132	0.57%
1956	12,483	51.09%	11,871	48.59%	79	0.32%
1960	12,803	46.89%	14,431	52.85%	70	0.26%
1964	7,701	30.61%	17,330	68.89%	125	0.50%
1968	10,305	38.33%	11,493	42.75%	5,088	18.92%
1972	16,111	59.42%	10,838	39.97%	164	0.60%
1976	12,732	42.82%	16,670	56.07%	329	1.11%
1980	15,508	49.74%	14,137	45.34%	1,536	4.93%
1984	19,419	57.48%	14,138	41.85%	228	0.67%
1988	16,544	53.04%	14,528	46.58%	120	0.38%
1992	13,333	36.34%	17,460	47.58%	5,901	16.08%
1996	14,396	40.08%	17,799	49.56%	3,721	10.36%
2000	19,417	52.01%	17,360	46.50%	559	1.50%
2004	24,495	57.86%	17,648	41.68%	194	0.46%
2008	25,326	52.89%	21,953	45.85%	605	1.26%
2012	25,450	53.83%	20,807	44.01%	1,021	2.16%
2016	30,035	57.99%	18,808	36.32%	2,946	5.69%
2020	33,668	57.99%	23,093	39.78%	1,296	2.23%
2024	34,734	59.07%	22,810	38.79%	1,260	2.14%

== Demographics ==
Historical population
Census	Pop.	Note	%±
1810	5,670		—
1820	8,709		53.6%
1830	10,686		22.7%
1840	14,595		36.6%
1850	15,828		8.4%
1860	20,502		29.5%
1870	24,770		20.8%
1880	28,610		15.5%
1890	30,259		5.8%
1900	31,835		5.2%
1910	30,260		−4.9%
1920	29,381		−2.9%
1930	30,764		4.7%
1940	31,020		0.8%
1950	48,330		55.8%
1960	62,795		29.9%
1970	75,876		20.8%
1980	88,838		17.1%
1990	87,774		−1.2%
2000	96,472		9.9%
2010	110,232		14.3%
2020	121,093		9.9%
2025 (est.)	130,451	▲	7.7%
US Decennial Census; 1790–1960 1900–1990; 1990–2000 2010–2019

=== Racial and ethnic composition ===
Clark County, Indiana – Racial and ethnic composition Note: the US Census treats Hispanic/Latino as an ethnic category. This table excludes Latinos from the racial categories and assigns them to a separate category. Hispanics/Latinos may be of any race.
Race / Ethnicity (NH = Non-Hispanic)	Pop 1980	Pop 1990	Pop 2000	Pop 2010	Pop 2020	% 1980	% 1990	% 2000	% 2010	% 2020
White alone (NH)	83,565	81,952	86,194	93,887	95,403	94.06%	93.36%	89.35%	85.17%	78.78%
Black or African American alone (NH)	4,296	4,663	6,345	7,541	9,265	4.84%	5.31%	6.58%	6.84%	7.65%
Native American or Alaska Native alone (NH)	130	185	218	255	249	0.15%	0.21%	0.23%	0.23%	0.21%
Asian alone (NH)	301	342	565	858	1,305	0.34%	0.39%	0.59%	0.78%	1.08%
Native Hawaiian or Pacific Islander alone (NH)	x	x	30	43	127	x	x	0.03%	0.04%	0.10%
Other race alone (NH)	111	75	102	198	491	0.12%	0.09%	0.11%	0.18%	0.41%
Mixed race or Multiracial (NH)	x	x	1,219	2,100	6,362	x	x	1.26%	1.91%	5.25%
Hispanic or Latino (any race)	435	560	1,799	5,350	7,891	0.49%	0.64%	1.86%	4.85%	6.52%
Total	88,838	87,777	96,472	110,232	121,093	100.00%	100.00%	100.00%	100.00%	100.00%

=== 2020 census ===
As of the 2020 census, the county had a population of 121,093. The median age was 39.4 years. 22.8% of residents were under the age of 18 and 16.4% of residents were 65 years of age or older. For every 100 females there were 95.0 males, and for every 100 females age 18 and over there were 92.4 males age 18 and over.

The racial makeup of the county was 80.2% White, 7.8% Black or African American, 0.5% American Indian and Alaska Native, 1.1% Asian, 0.1% Native Hawaiian and Pacific Islander, 3.3% from some other race, and 7.1% from two or more races. Hispanic or Latino residents of any race comprised 6.5% of the population.

78.7% of residents lived in urban areas, while 21.3% lived in rural areas.

There were 48,778 households in the county, of which 30.5% had children under the age of 18 living in them. Of all households, 46.1% were married-couple households, 18.1% were households with a male householder and no spouse or partner present, and 27.7% were households with a female householder and no spouse or partner present. About 28.3% of all households were made up of individuals and 11.3% had someone living alone who was 65 years of age or older.

There were 52,169 housing units, of which 6.5% were vacant. Among occupied housing units, 70.4% were owner-occupied and 29.6% were renter-occupied. The homeowner vacancy rate was 1.3% and the rental vacancy rate was 7.8%.

=== 2010 census ===
As of the 2010 United States census, there were 110,232 people, 44,248 households, and 29,474 families in the county. The population density was 295.6 inhabitants per square mile (114.1 inhabitants/km^{2}). There were 47,776 housing units at an average density of 128.1 units per square mile (49.5 units/km^{2}). The racial makeup of the county was 87.1% white, 6.9% black or African American, 0.8% Asian, 0.3% American Indian, 2.6% from other races, and 2.2% from two or more races. Those of Hispanic or Latino origin made up 4.9% of the population. In terms of ancestry, 24.3% were German, 15.0% were Irish, 13.0% were American, and 9.8% were English.

Of the 44,248 households, 32.6% had children under the age of 18 living with them, 48.4% were married couples living together, 12.9% had a female householder with no husband present, 33.4% were non-families, and 27.6% of all households were made up of individuals. The average household size was 2.46 and the average family size was 2.98. The median age was 37.9 years.

The median income for a household in the county was $47,697 and the median income for a family was $58,090. Males had a median income of $43,053 versus $32,361 for females. The per capita income for the county was $23,592. About 9.0% of families and 11.8% of the population were below the poverty line, including 17.9% of those under age 18 and 7.5% of those age 65 or over.

== Education ==
Four public school districts and the Archdiocese of Indianapolis serve Clark County. The county is also served by two colleges that offer associate and bachelor's degrees.

=== Public school districts ===
Clarksville Community School Corporation

- Clarksville High School
- Clarksville Middle School
- Greenacres Elementary School

Silver Creek School Corporation

- Silver Creek High School
- Silver Creek Middle School
- Silver Creek Elementary School
- Silver Creek Primary School

Borden–Henryville School Corporation

- Borden Jr/Sr High School
- Henryville Jr/Sr High School
- Borden Elementary School
- Henryville Elementary School

Greater Clark County Schools

- Charlestown High School
- Jeffersonville High School
- New Washington Middle/High School
- Charlestown Middle School
- Parkview Middle School
- River Valley Middle School
- Charlestown Elementary School
- Franklin Square Elementary School
- New Washington Elementary School
- Northaven Elementary School
- Parkwood Elementary School
- Riverside Elementary School
- Utica Elementary School
- Options Alternative School
- Corden Porter School

=== Private schools ===
Archdiocese of Indianapolis

- Our Lady of Providence High School
- St. Anthony of Padua Elementary School(K–7)
- Sacred Heart of Jesus (PK–8)
- St. John Paul II School(K–8)

=== Colleges and universities ===
- Ivy Tech State College (Non-profit)
- Mid-America College of Funeral Services (Non-profit)
- Ottawa University – Jeffersonville (Non-Profit)

== See also ==
- Louisville-Jefferson County, KY-IN Metropolitan Statistical Area
- Louisville/Jefferson County–Elizabethtown–Bardstown, KY-IN Combined Statistical Area
- National Register of Historic Places listings in Clark County, Indiana
