= Arctic Springs, Indiana =

Unincorporated community in Indiana, United States

Coordinates: 38°16′59″N 85°42′41″W

Arctic Springs is a neighborhood of Jeffersonville, Indiana, one mile east of downtown Jeffersonville, and directly across from Louisville's famed Water Tower. It was established as a resort area full of summer cottages. The Jeffersonville Elks Club ran a popular outdoor dance hall in the 1920s.

After its height as a resort area, it served as a water supply for the rest of Jeffersonville, as it had an aquifer from which wells could obtain water.

The community is listed as an Unincorporated place by the USGS.
