= Prather, Indiana =

Unincorporated community in Indiana, United States

Coordinates: 38°22′54″N 85°41′34″W

Prather is an unincorporated community in Clark County, Indiana, in the United States.

== History ==
A post office was established at Prather in 1878, and remained in operation until it was discontinued in 1933. Prather was the name of a family who kept a shop.
