= Blue Lick, Indiana =

Unincorporated community in Indiana, United States

Blue Lick
- Unincorporated community
- Clark County's location in Indiana

- Location in Clark County
- Coordinates: 38°30′30″N 85°48′17″W
- Country: United States
- State: Indiana
- County: Clark
- Township: Monroe
- Elevation: 532 ft (162 m)
- ZIP code: 47126
- FIPS code: 18-06004
- GNIS feature ID: 449620

Blue Lick is an unincorporated community in Monroe Township, Clark County, Indiana, United States.

== History ==
A post office was established at Blue Lick in 1837, and remained in operation until it was discontinued in 1905.

The community took its name from Blue Lick Creek. The creek was named for the blue slate in the riverbed.
