= Oak Park, Indiana =

- CDP
- Coordinates: 38°18′19″N 85°41′23″W
- Country: United States
- State: Indiana
- County: Clark

Area
  - Total: 2.2 sq mi (5.8 km^{2})
  - Land: 2.2 sq mi (5.8 km^{2})
  - Water: 0 sq mi (0.0 km^{2})
- Elevation: 459 ft (140 m)

Population (2000)
  - Total: 5,379
  - Density: 2,408/sq mi (929.6/km^{2})
- Time zone: UTC-5 (Eastern (EST))
  - Summer (DST): UTC-4 (EDT)
- FIPS code: 18-55782
- GNIS feature ID: 2393163

Oak Park is a census-designated place (CDP) in Clark County, Indiana, United States. The population was 5,379 at the 2000 census.

== Geography ==
According to the United States Census Bureau, the CDP has a total area of 2.2 square miles (5.7 km^{2}), of which 2.2 square miles (5.7 km^{2}) is land and 0.45% is water.

== Demographics ==
As of the census of 2000, there were 5,379 people, 2,081 households, and 1,569 families residing in the CDP. The population density was 2,407.8 inhabitants per square mile (929.7/km^{2}). There were 2,186 housing units at an average density of 978.5 per square mile (377.8/km^{2}). The racial makeup of the CDP was 87.38% White, 10.49% African American, 0.15% Native American, 0.39% Asian, 0.02% Pacific Islander, 0.26% from other races, and 1.32% from two or more races. Hispanic or Latino of any race were 0.63% of the population.

There were 2,081 households, out of which 33.2% had children under the age of 18 living with them, 60.2% were married couples living together, 11.8% had a female householder with no husband present, and 24.6% were non-families. 20.4% of all households were made up of individuals, and 7.3% had someone living alone who was 65 years of age or older. The average household size was 2.58 and the average family size was 2.97.

In the CDP, the population was spread out, with 24.6% under the age of 18, 8.3% from 18 to 24, 29.0% from 25 to 44, 25.7% from 45 to 64, and 12.4% who were 65 years of age or older. The median age was 38 years. For every 100 females, there were 94.8 males. For every 100 females age 18 and over, there were 91.5 males.

The median income for a household in the CDP was $51,663, and the median income for a family was $56,844. Males had a median income of $32,708 versus $25,625 for females. The per capita income for the CDP was $22,445. About 2.9% of families and 3.4% of the population were below the poverty line, including 3.5% of those under age 18 and 0.6% of those age 65 or over.
