= Charlestown Township, Clark County, Indiana =

Charlestown Township
- Township
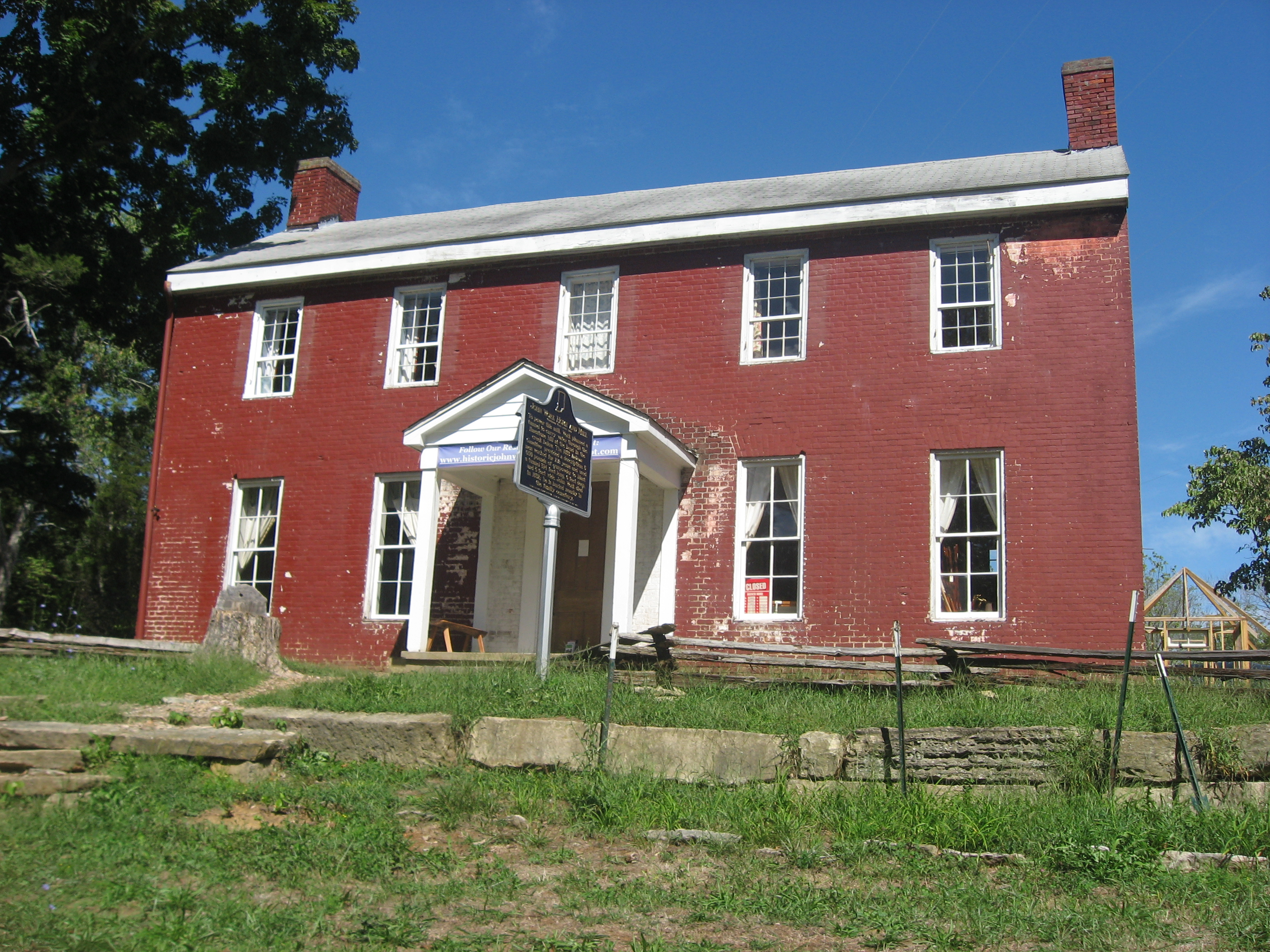
- The John Work House, a historic site in the township

- Location of Charlestown Township in Clark County
- Coordinates: 38°27′34″N 85°39′46″W
- Country: United States
- State: Indiana
- County: Clark

Government
  - Type: Indiana township

Area
  - Total: 65.09 sq mi (168.6 km^{2})
  - Land: 64.49 sq mi (167.0 km^{2})
  - Water: 0.6 sq mi (1.6 km^{2})
- Elevation: 610 ft (186 m)

Population (2020)
  - Total: 15,146
  - Density: 208.6/sq mi (80.5/km^{2})
- FIPS code: 18-12142
- GNIS feature ID: 453197

Charlestown Township is one of twelve townships in Clark County, Indiana. As of the 2010 census, its population was 13,450 and it contained 5,382 housing units.

== History ==
Charlestown Township was organized in 1817.

== Geography ==
According to the 2010 census, the township has a total area of 65.09 square miles (168.6 km^{2}), of which 64.49 square miles (167.0 km^{2}) (or 99.08%) is land and 0.6 square miles (1.6 km^{2}) (or 0.92%) is water.

=== Cities and towns ===
- Charlestown

=== Unincorporated towns ===
- Otisco
- Rolling Hills
- Springville (extinct)

=== Adjacent townships ===
- Oregon Township (north)
- Owen Township (east)
- Utica Township (south)
- Silver Creek Township (southwest)
- Union Township (west)
- Monroe Township (northwest)

=== Major highways ===
- Indiana State Road 3
- Indiana State Road 62
- Indiana State Road 160
- Indiana State Road 403

=== Cemeteries ===
The township contains several cemeteries: Armstrong Cemetery, Baird Cemetery (a.k.a. King), Bottorff, Caldwell (a.k.a. Lutz/Prather), Carter, Charlestown, Coble, County Poor Farm, Crace, Douglas, Faris, Fifty-four, Goodwin, Goodwin/Nicholson, Hammond, Hester-Rowland, Kessler (a.k.a. Faris II), Long, Mathes, McCormick (a.k.a. McCullough), McDonald, Meloy, Montgomery, Otisco Cemetery (a.k.a. Seedtick), Pleasant Grove, Robertson, Robinson, Salem Methodist Church, Shelby Cemetery, Silver Creek Cemetery, St. Michael's, James Stuart Plantation, Weimer, and Worrell/Worrall.
