= Indiana in the American Civil War =

Indiana, a state in the Midwest, played an important role in supporting the Union during the American Civil War. Despite anti-war activity within the state, and southern Indiana's ancestral ties to the South, Indiana was a strong supporter of the Union. Indiana contributed approximately 210,000 Union soldiers, sailors, and marines. Indiana's soldiers served in 308 military engagements during the war; the majority of them in the western theater, between the Mississippi River and the Appalachian Mountains. Indiana's war-related deaths reached 25,028 (7,243 from battle and 17,785 from disease). Its state government provided funds to purchase equipment, food, and supplies for troops in the field. Indiana, an agriculturally rich state containing the fifth-highest population in the Union, was critical to the North's success due to its geographical location, large population, and agricultural production. Indiana residents, also known as Hoosiers, supplied the Union with manpower for the war effort, a railroad network and access to the Ohio River and the Great Lakes, and agricultural products such as grain and livestock. The state experienced two minor raids by Confederate forces, and one major raid in 1863, which caused a brief panic in southern portions of the state and its capital city, Indianapolis.

Indiana experienced significant political strife during the war, especially after Governor Oliver P. Morton suppressed the Democratic-controlled state legislature, which had an anti-war (Copperhead) element. Major debates related to the issues of slavery and emancipation, military service for African Americans, and the draft, ensued. These led to violence. In 1863, after the state legislature failed to pass a budget and left the state without the authority to collect taxes, Governor Morton acted outside his state's constitutional authority to secure funding through federal and private loans to operate the state government and avert a financial crisis.

The American Civil War altered Indiana's society, politics, and economy, beginning a population shift to central and northern Indiana, and contributed to a relative decline in the southern part of the state. Increased wartime manufacturing and industrial growth in Hoosier cities and towns ushered in a new era of economic prosperity. By the end of the war, Indiana had become a less rural state than it previously had been. Indiana's votes were closely split between the parties for several decades after the war, making it one of a few key swing states that often decided national elections. Between 1868 and 1916, five Indiana politicians were vice-presidential nominees on the major party tickets. In 1888 Benjamin Harrison, one of the state's former Civil War generals, was elected president of the United States.

== Indiana's contributions ==
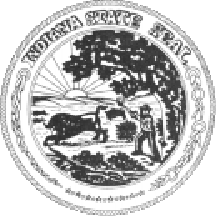
Indiana's state seal during the war

Indiana was the first of the country's western states to mobilize for the Civil War. When news reached Indiana of the attack on Fort Sumter, South Carolina, on April 12, 1861, many Indiana residents were surprised, but their response was immediate. On the following day, two mass meetings were held in Indianapolis, the state capital of Indiana, and the state's position was decided: Indiana would remain in the Union and would immediately contribute men to suppress the rebellion. On April 15, Indiana's governor, Oliver P. Morton, issued a call for volunteer soldiers to meet the state's quota set by President Abraham Lincoln.

Indiana's geographical location in the Midwest, its large population, and its agricultural production made the state's wartime support critical to the Union's success. Indiana, with the fifth-largest population of the states that remained in the Union, could supply much-needed manpower for the war effort, its railroad network and access to the Ohio River and the Great Lakes could transport troops and supplies, and its agricultural yield, which became even more valuable to the Union after the loss of the rich farmland of the South, could provide grain and livestock.

=== Military service ===
On April 15, 1861, President Lincoln called for a total of 75,000 volunteers to join the Union army. On the same day, Governor Morton telegraphed the president offering 10,000 Indiana volunteers. The state's initial quota was set at six regiments (a total of 4,683 men) for three months of service. Orders were issued on April 16 to form the state's first regiments and to gather at Indianapolis. On the first day, five hundred men were encamped in the city; within a week more than 12,000 Hoosier volunteers had signed up to fight for the Union, nearly three times as many needed to meet the state's initial quota.

Governor Morton and Lew Wallace, Indiana's adjutant general, established Camp Morton at the state fairgrounds in Indianapolis as the initial gathering place and training camp for the state's Union volunteers. (Camp Morton was converted to a prisoner-of-war camp in 1862.) By April 27, Indiana's first six regiments were fully organized as the First Brigade, Indiana Volunteers, under the command of Brigadier General Thomas A. Morris. Members of companies not selected for these first regiments were given the option of volunteering for three years of service or returning home until they were needed; some companies formed into regiments in the state militia and were called into federal service within a few weeks.

Indiana ranked second among the states in terms of the percentage of its men of military age who served in the Union army. Indiana contributed 208,367 men, roughly 15 percent of the state's total population to serve in the Union army, and 2,130 to serve in the navy. Most of Indiana's soldiers were volunteers; 11,718 were re-enlistments. Deserters numbered 10,846.

Indiana's volunteers responded to requests for military service in the early months of the war; however, as the war progressed and the number of casualties increased, the state government had to resort to conscription (the draft) to fill its quotas. Military conscription, which began in October 1862, was a divisive issue within the state. It was especially unpopular among Democrats, who viewed it as a threat to individual freedom and opposed legislation that allowed a man to purchase an exemption for $300 or pay another person to serve as his substitute. A total of 3,003 Hoosier men were drafted in October 1862; subsequent drafts in Indiana brought the total to 17,903.

Indiana's volunteers and draftees provided the Union army with 129 infantry regiments, 13 cavalry regiments, 3 cavalry companies, 1 regiment of heavy artillery, and 26 light artillery batteries. In addition to providing Union troops, Indiana also organized its own volunteer militia, known as the Indiana Legion. Formed in May 1861, the Legion was responsible for protecting Indiana's citizens from attack and maintaining order within the state.

More than 35 percent of the Hoosiers who joined the Union army became casualties: 24,416, roughly 12.6 percent of Indiana's soldiers who served, died in the conflict. An estimated 48,568 soldiers, double the number of Hoosiers killed in the war, were wounded. Indiana's war-related death toll eventually reached 25,028 (7,243 from battle and 17,785 from disease).

== Notable leaders from Indiana ==
By the end of the war, Indiana could claim 46 general officers in the Union army who had at one time resided in the state. These men included Don Carlos Buell, Ambrose Burnside, Lew Wallace, Robert H. Milroy, and Joseph J. Reynolds, and Jefferson C. Davis, among others.

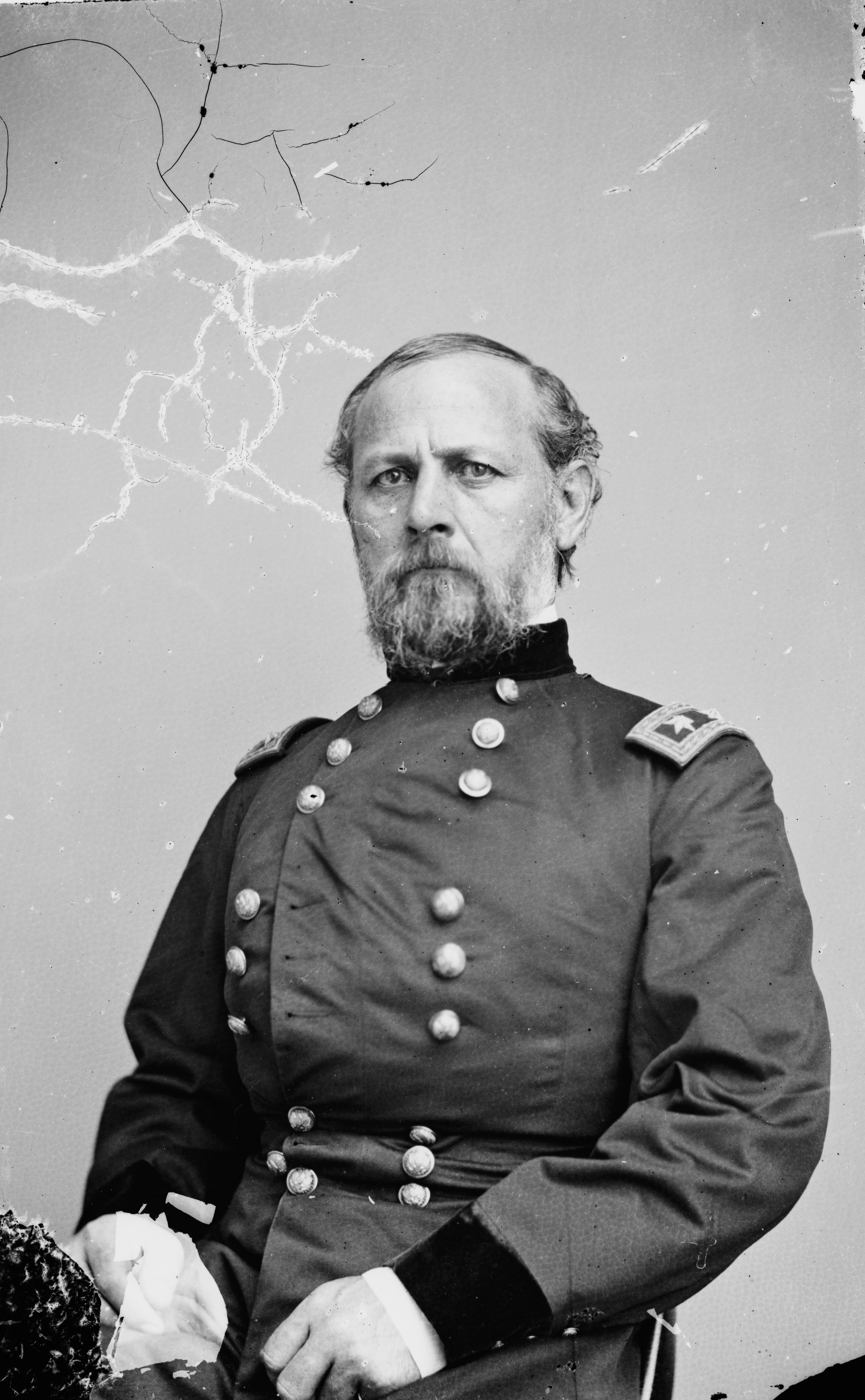
Maj. Gen.
Don Carlos Buell

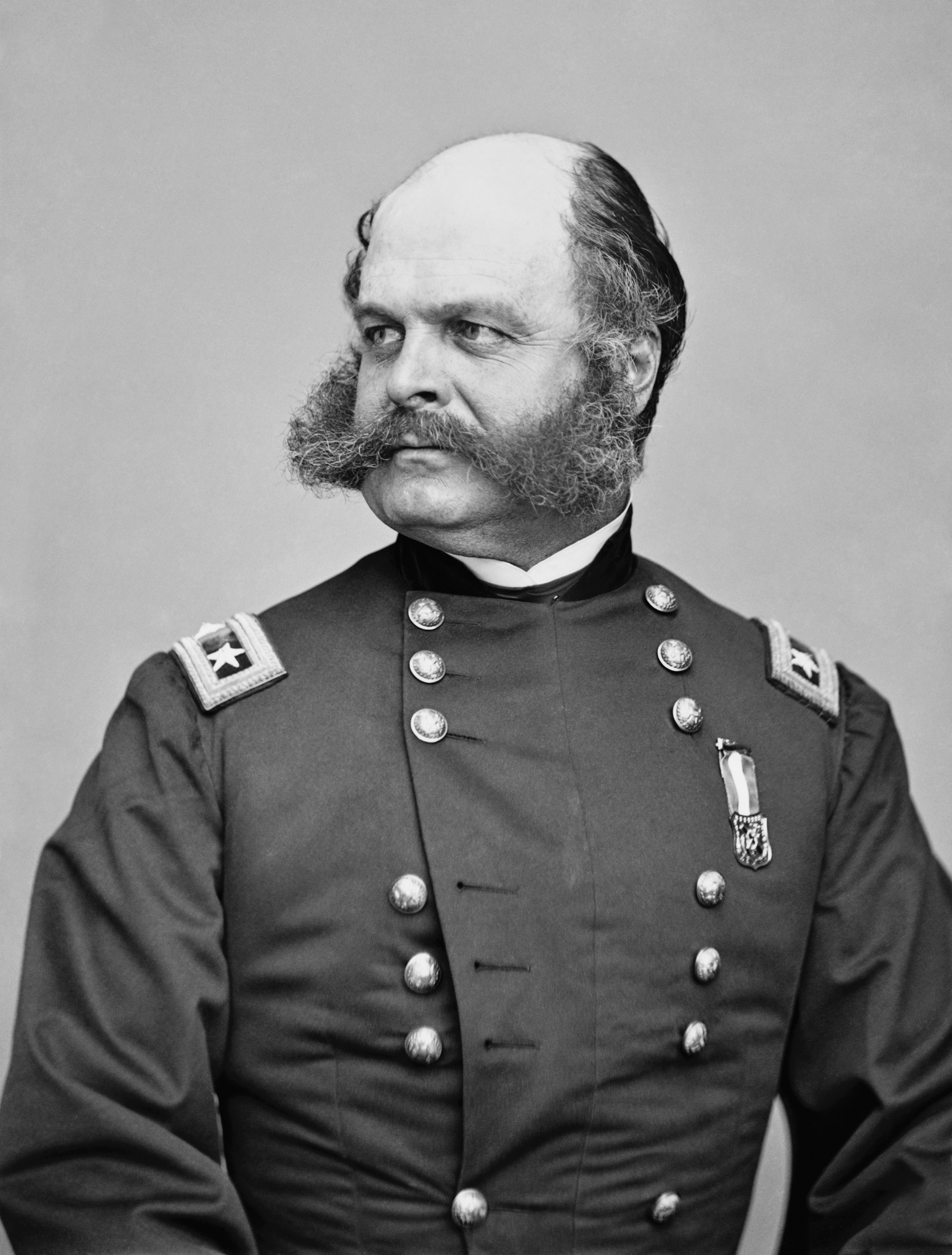
Maj. Gen.
Ambrose Burnside

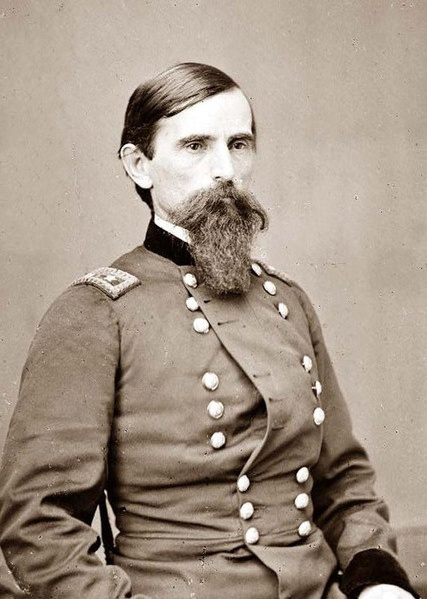
Maj. Gen.
Lewis Wallace

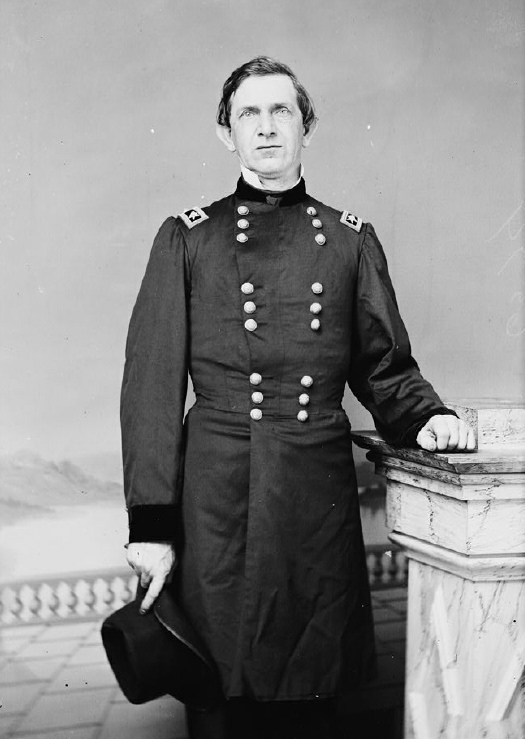
Maj. Gen.
Edward Canby

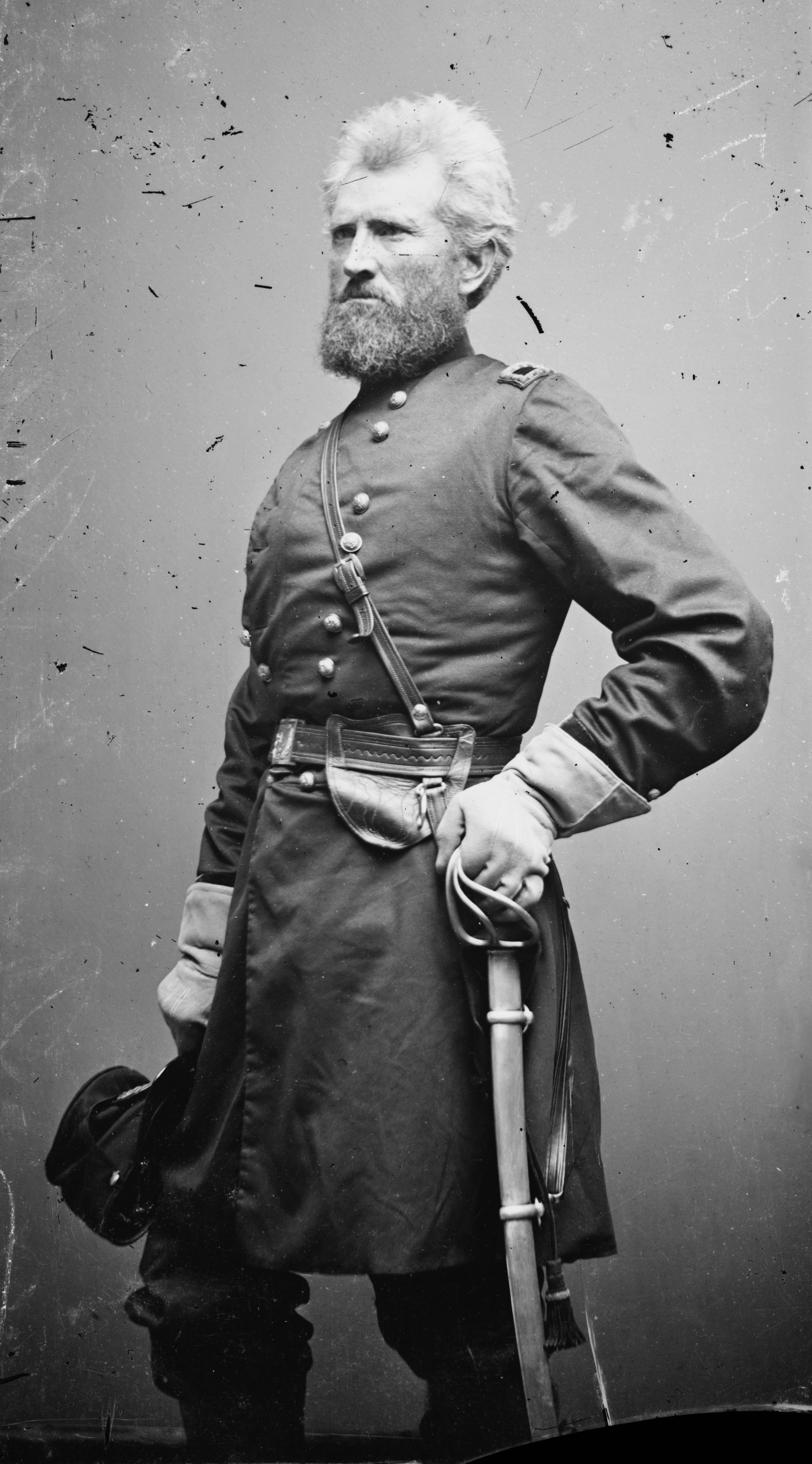
Maj. Gen.
Robert H. Milroy

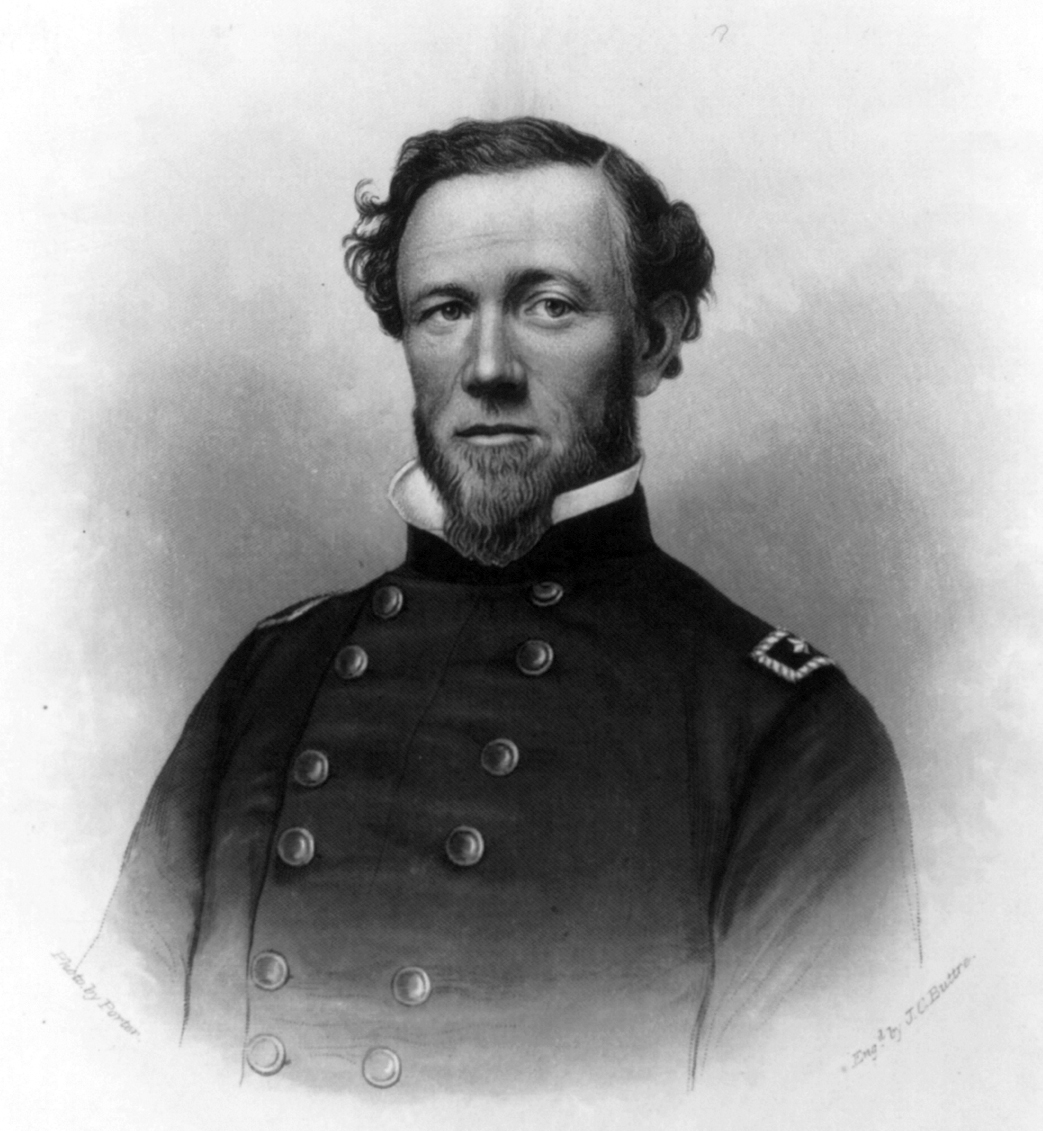
Maj. Gen.
Joseph J. Reynolds

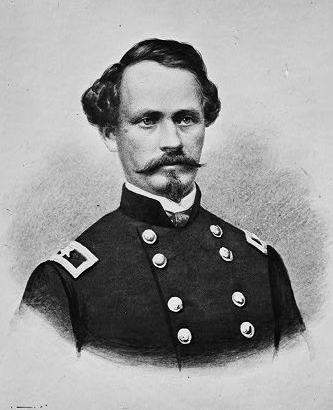
Maj. Gen.
Alvin P. Hovey

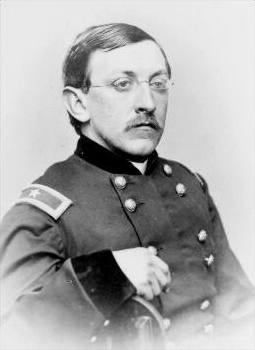
Bvt. Maj. Gen.
George H. Chapman

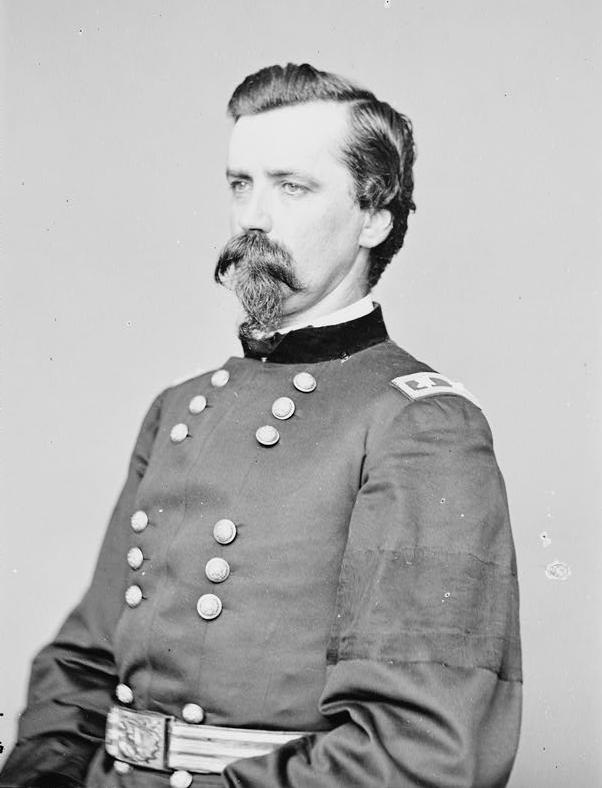
Bvt. Maj. Gen.
Robert Sanford Foster

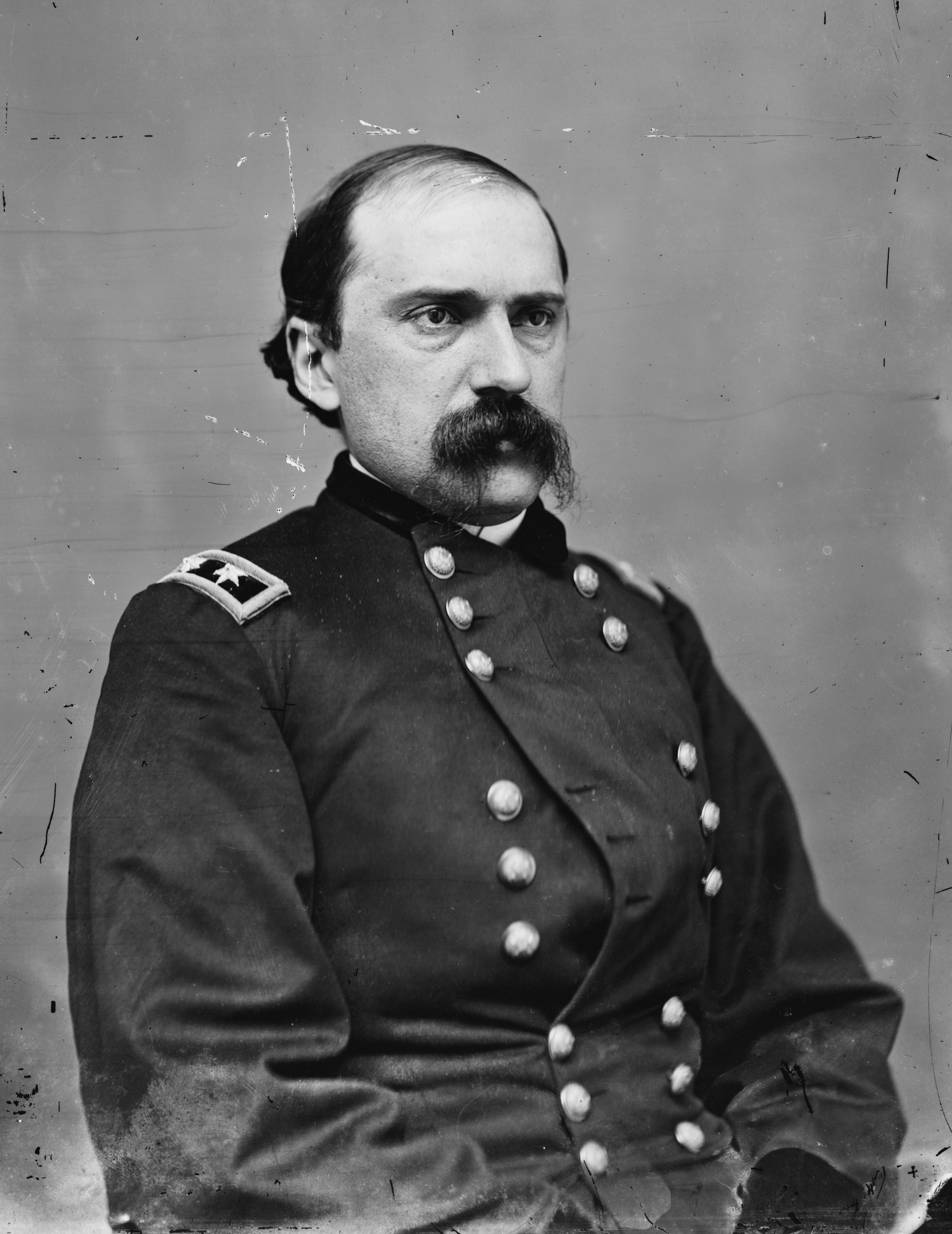
Bvt. Maj. Gen.
Edward M. McCook

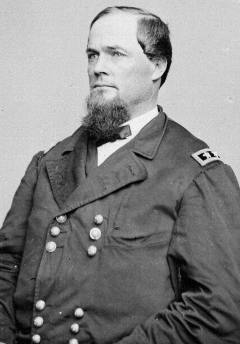
Bvt. Maj. Gen.
James W. McMillan

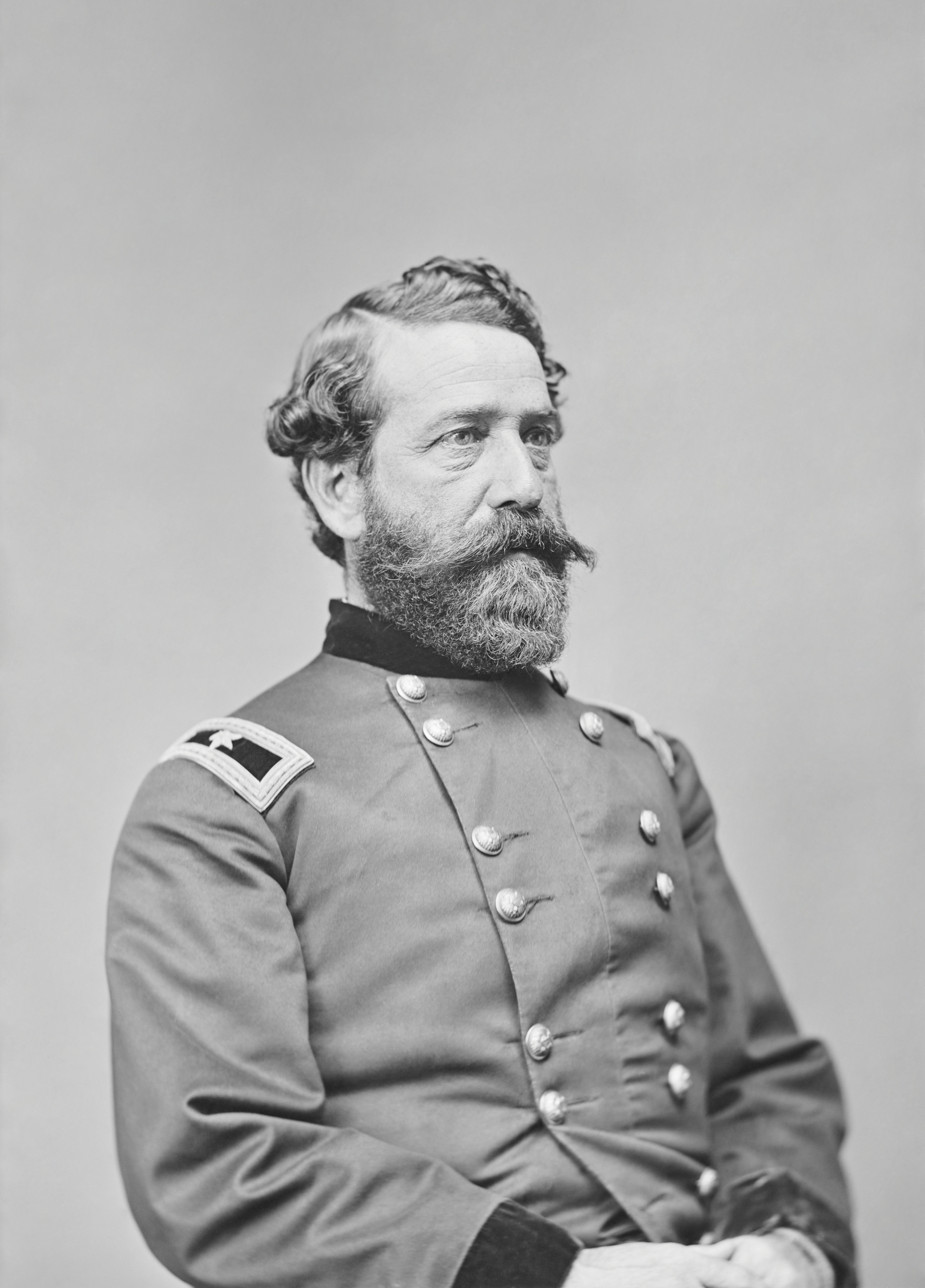
Bvt. Maj. Gen.
John M. Brannan

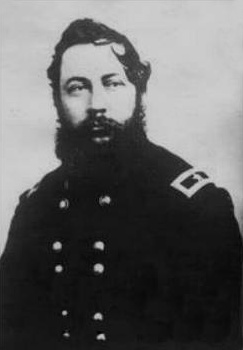
Bvt. Maj. Gen.
Robert A. Cameron

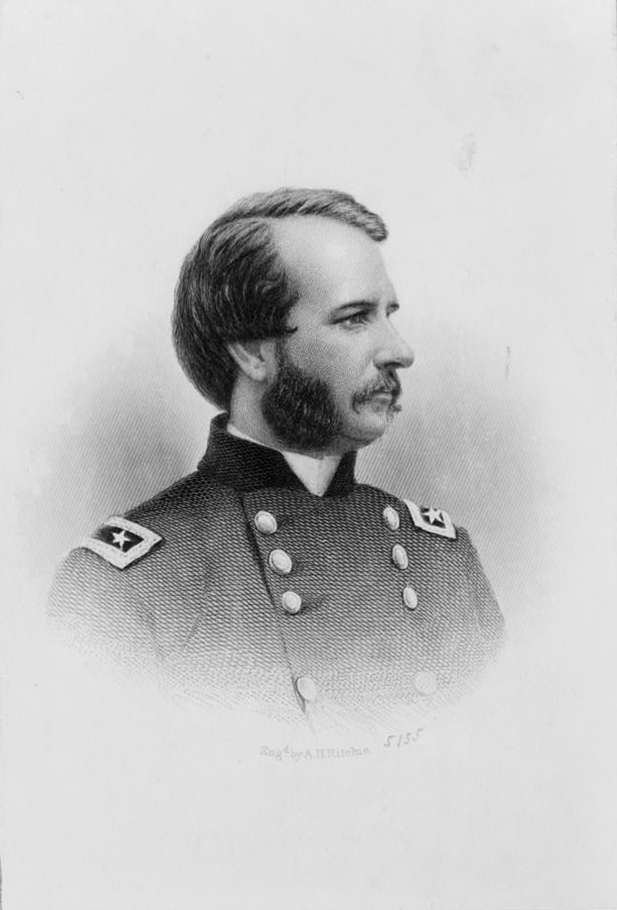
Bvt. Maj. Gen.
John F. Miller

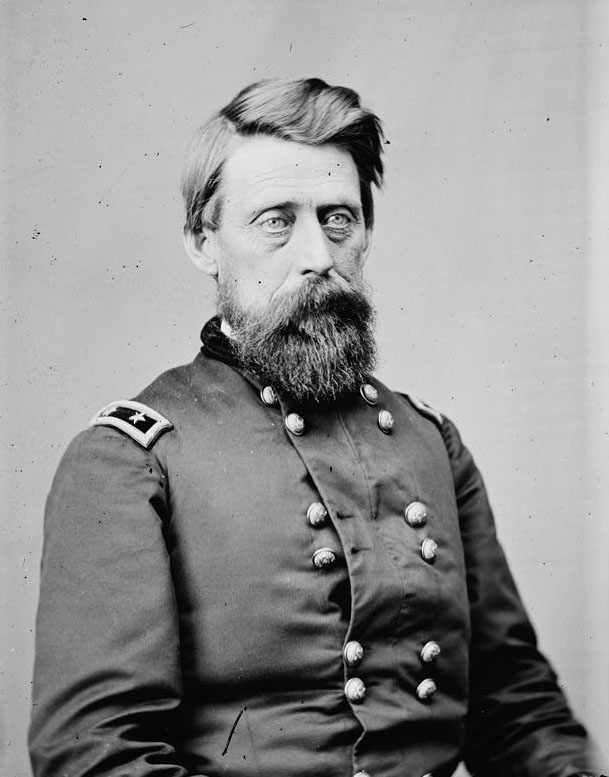
Bvt. Maj. Gen.
Jefferson C. Davis

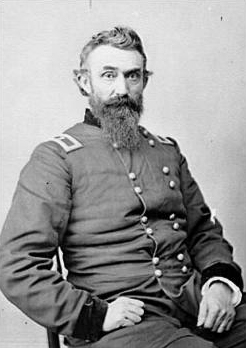
Bvt. Maj. Gen.
Nathan Kimball

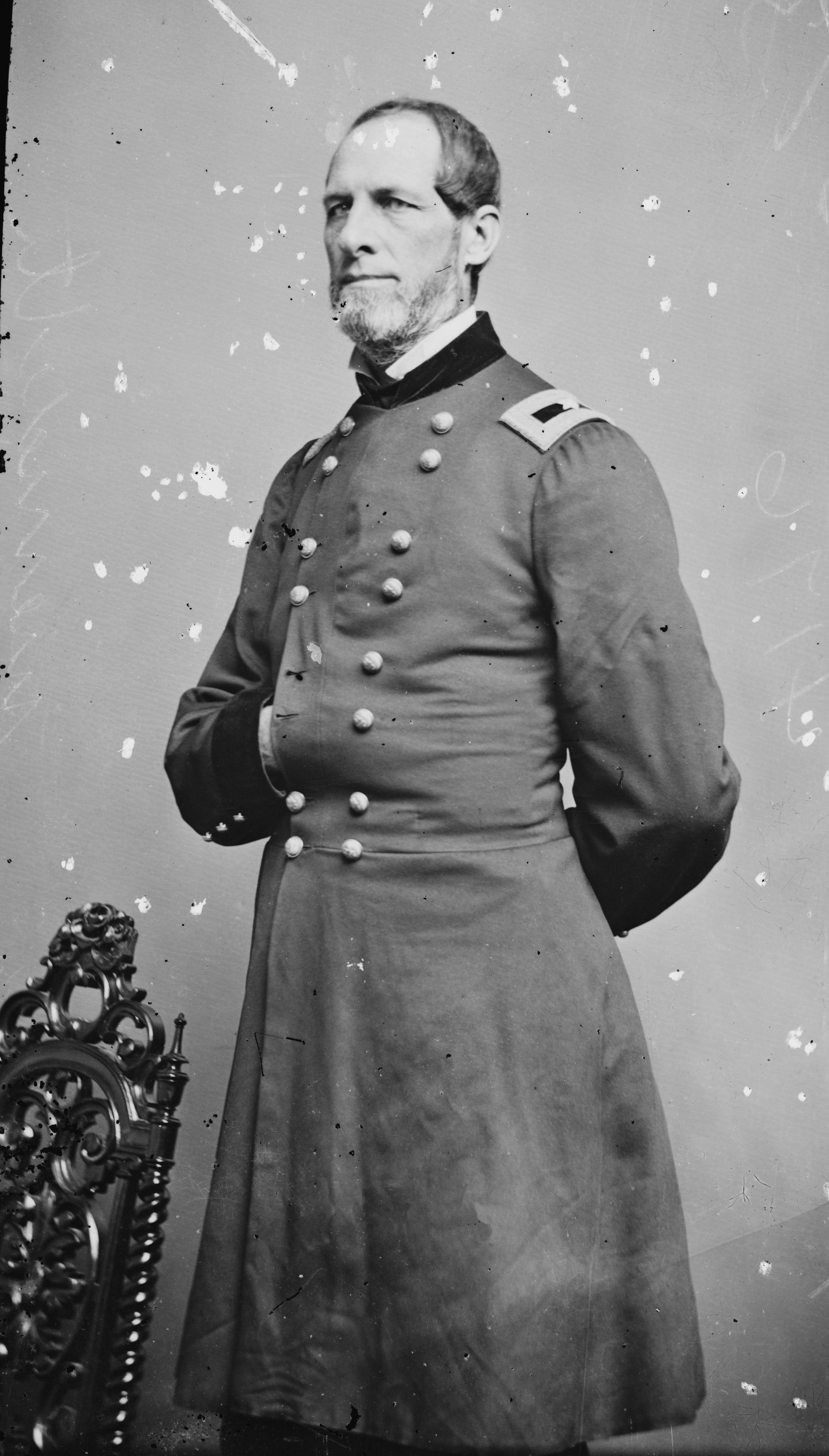
Bvt. Maj. Gen.
Solomon Meredith

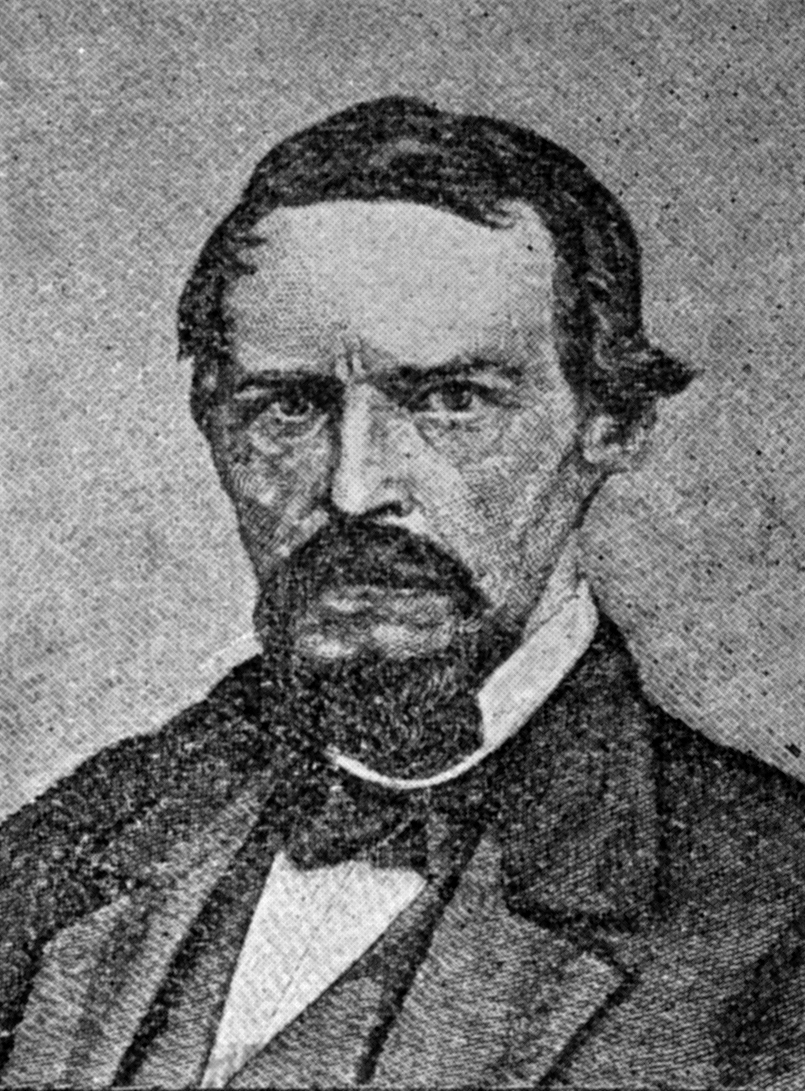
Brig. Gen.
Ebenezer Dumont

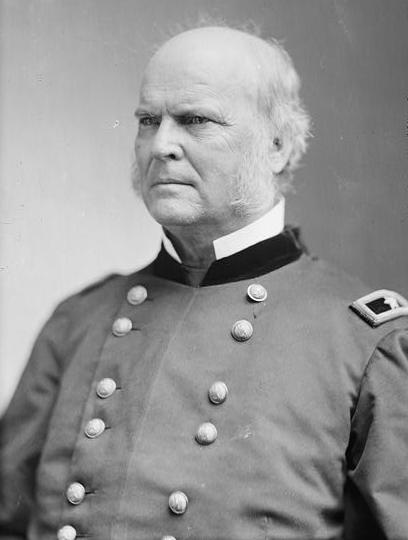
Brig. Gen.
William M. Dunn

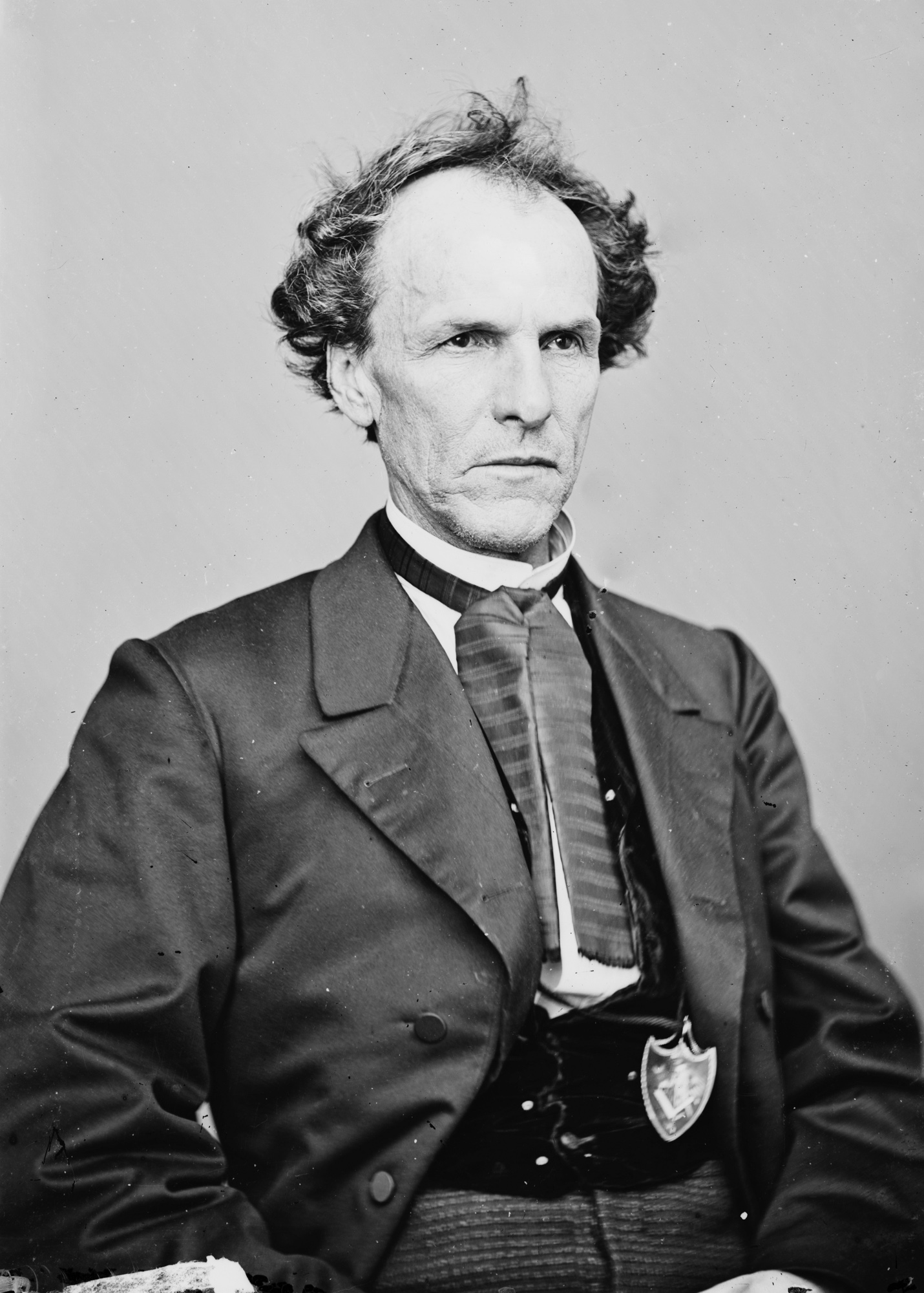
Brig. Gen.
James H. Lane

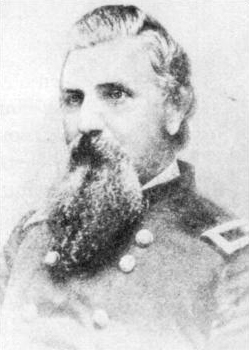
Brig. Gen.
Mahlon D. Manson

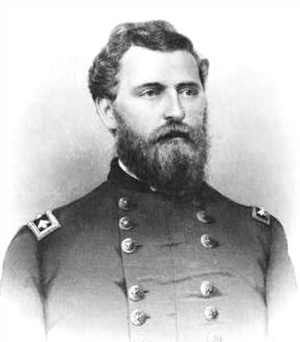
Brig. Gen.
Charles Cruft

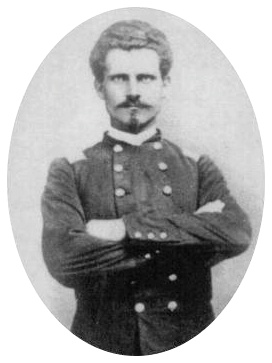
Brig. Gen.
Robert F. Catterson

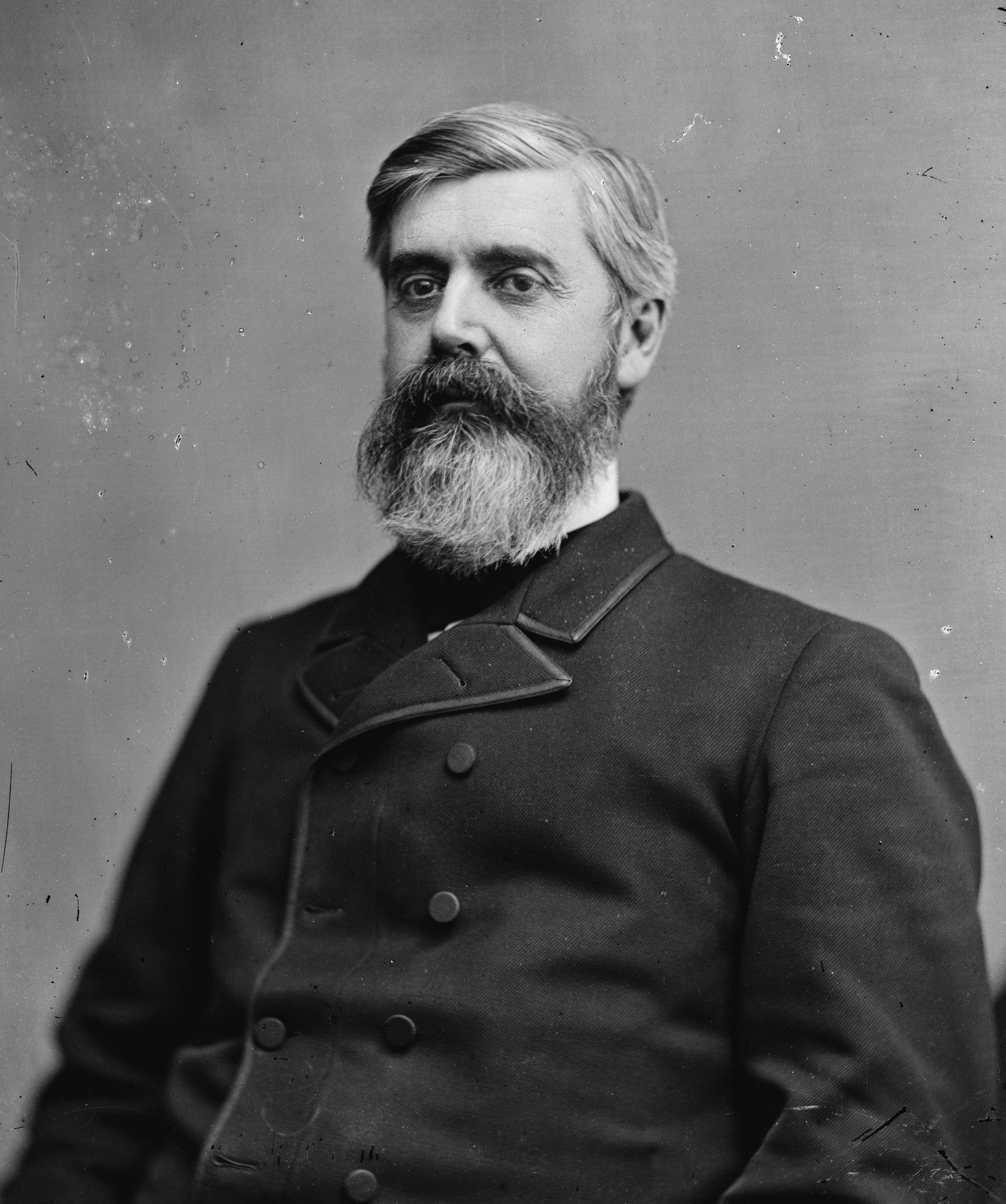
Brig. Gen.
Walter Q. Gresham

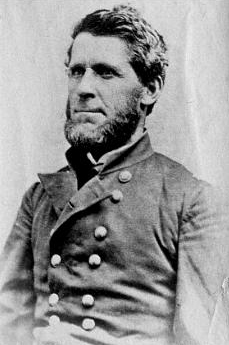
Brig. Gen.
William Grose

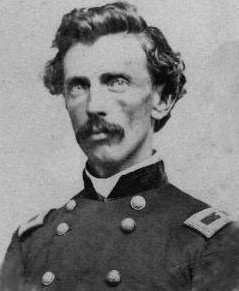
Brig. Gen.
Milo S. Hascall

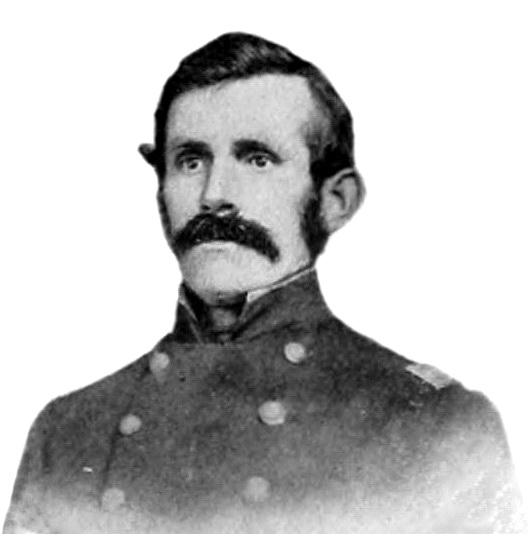
Brig. Gen.
Pleasant A. Hackleman

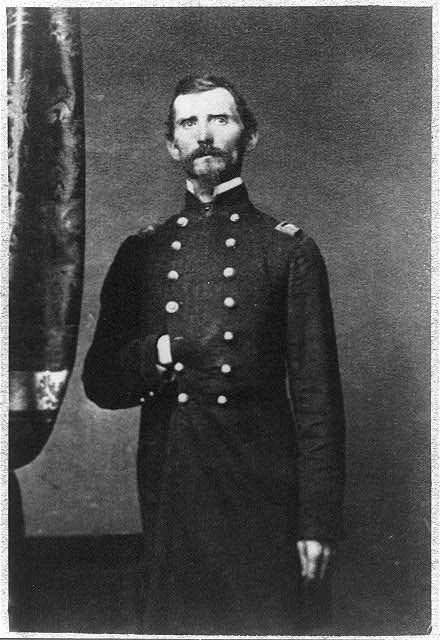
Brig. Gen.
George F. McGinnis

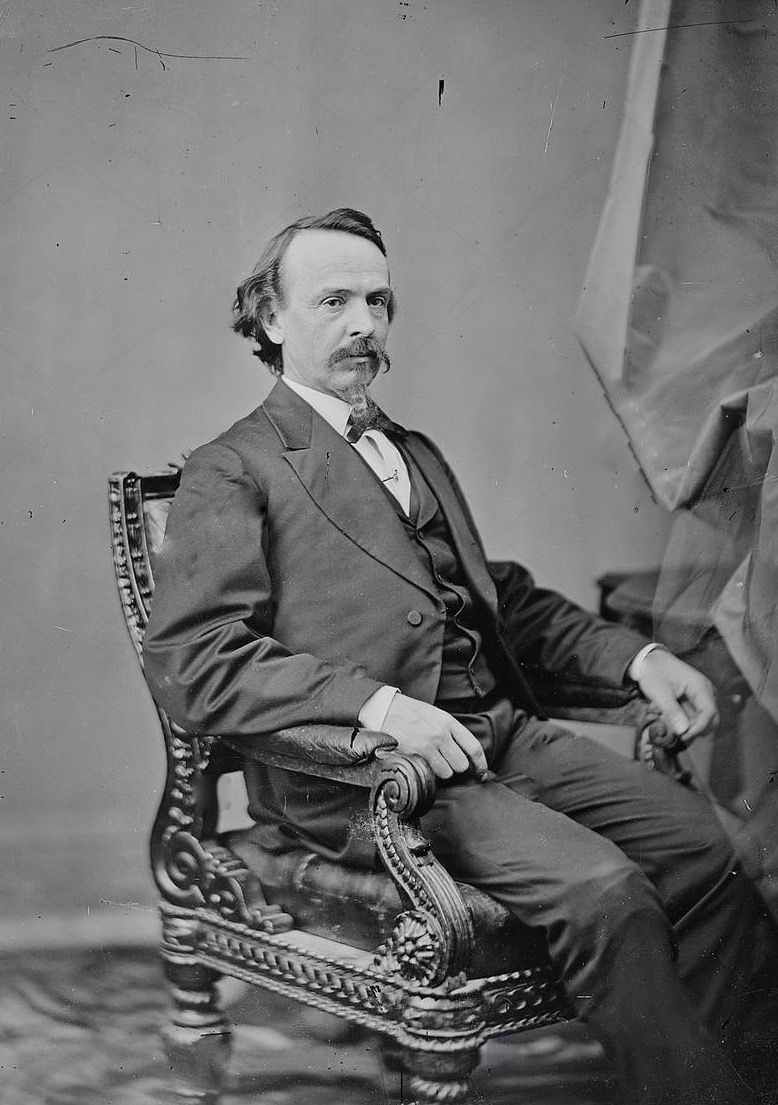
Bvt. Brig. Gen.
John Coburn

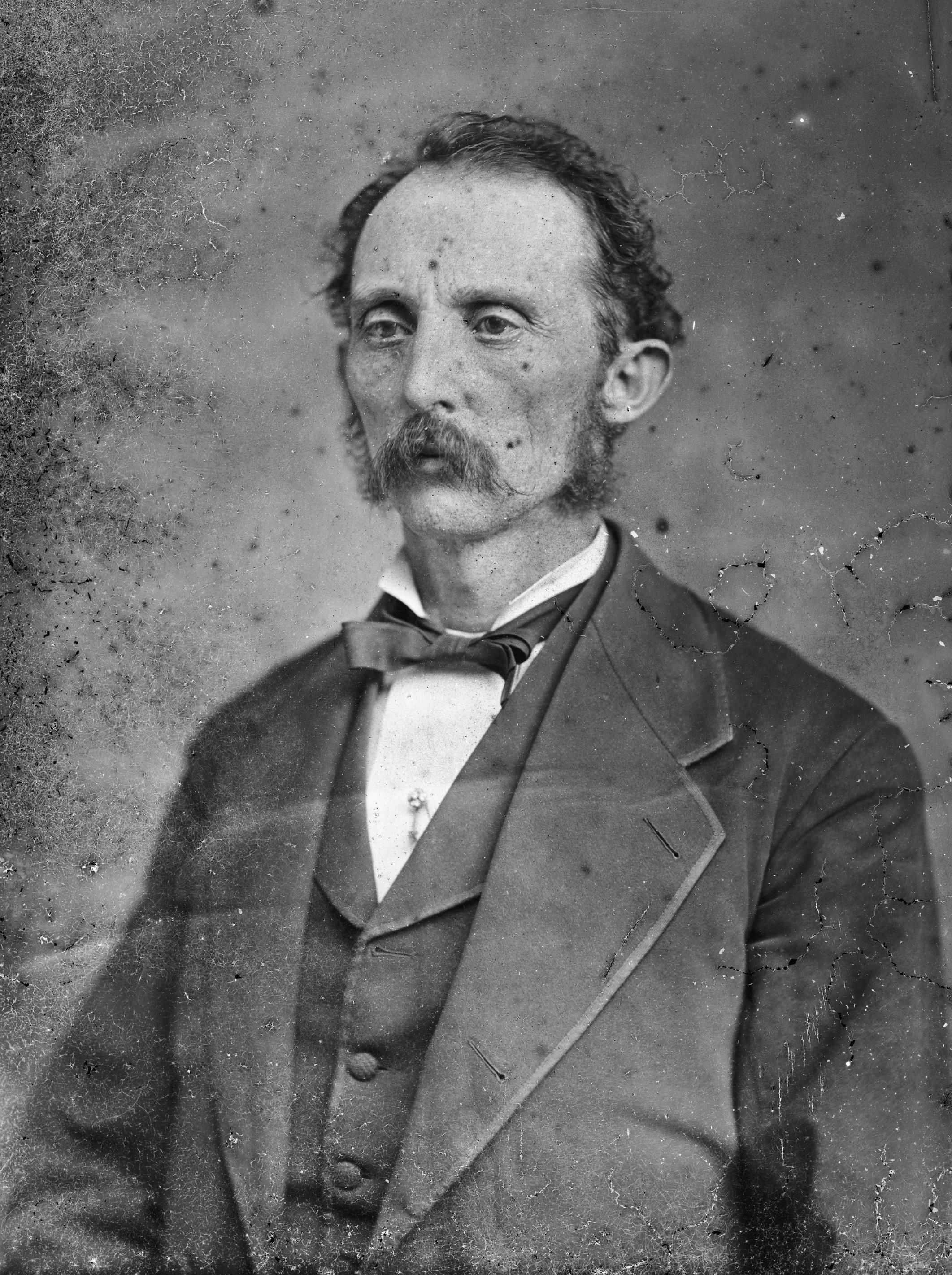
Bvt. Brig. Gen.
Thomas W. Bennett

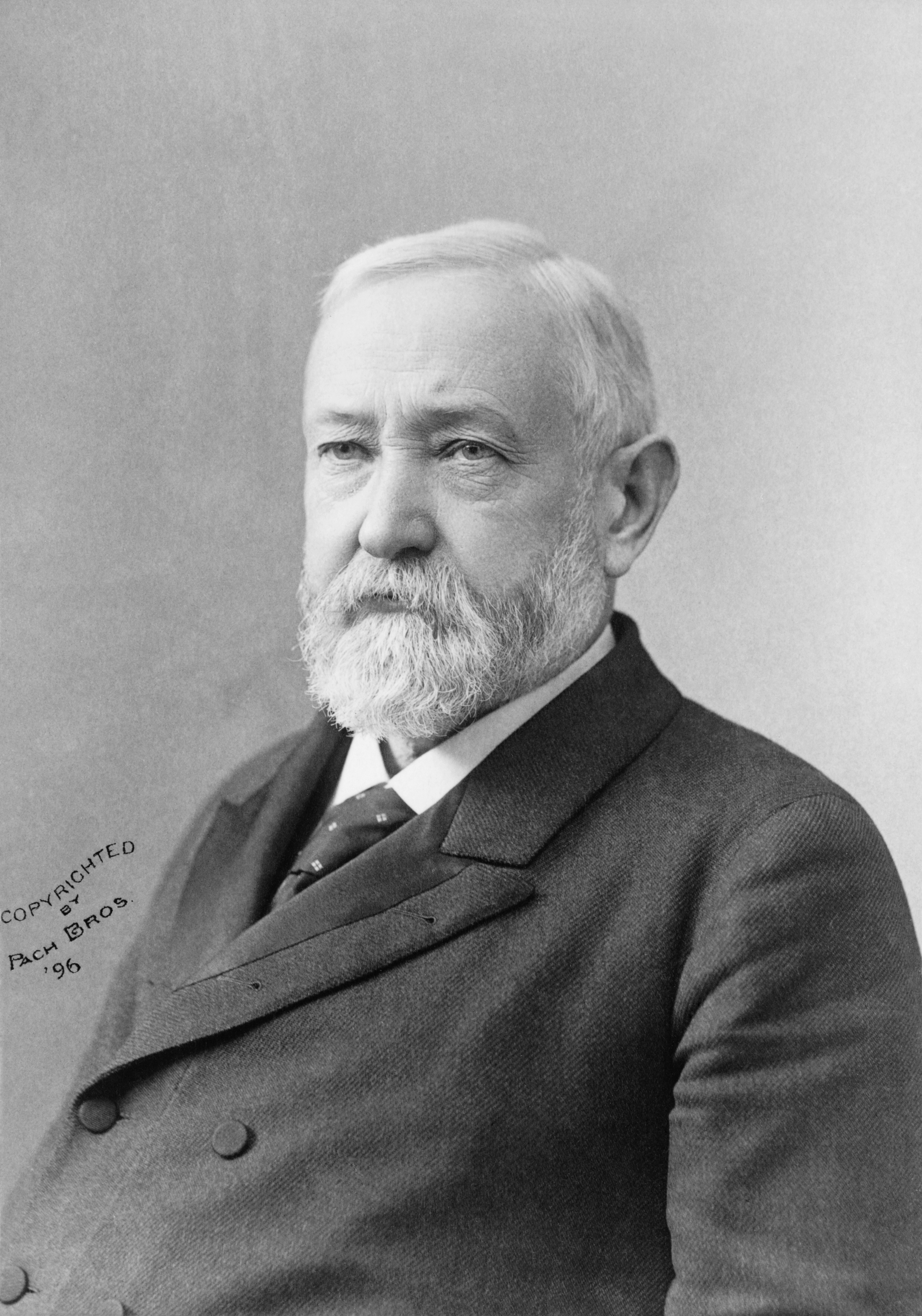
Bvt. Brig. Gen.
Benjamin Harrison

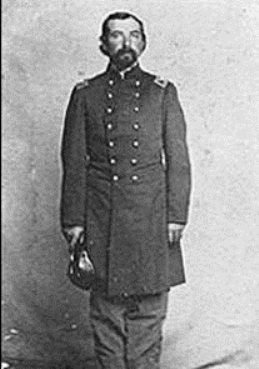
Bvt. Brig. Gen.
Frederick Knefler

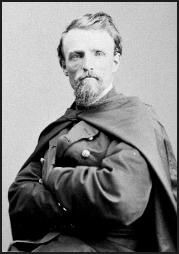
Bvt. Brig. Gen.
George P. Buell

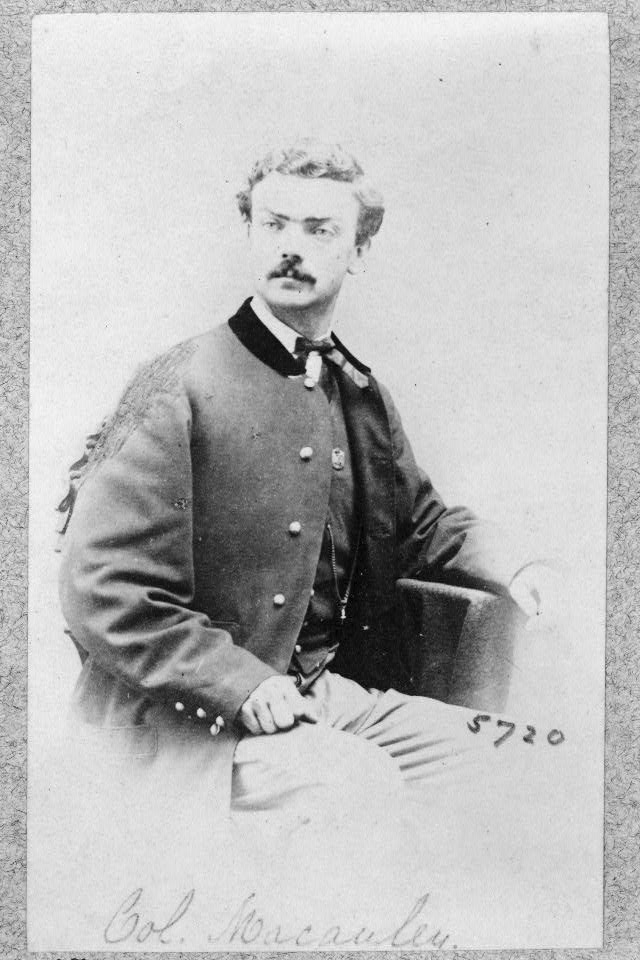
Col.
Daniel McCauley

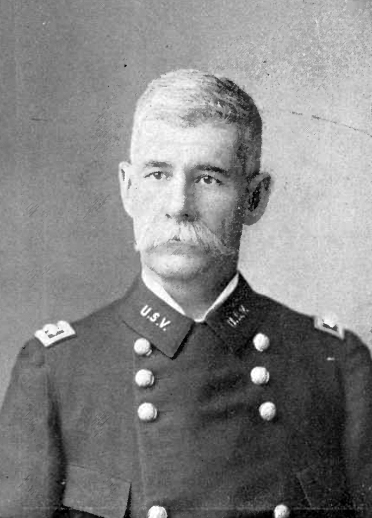
Bvt. Col.
Henry W. Lawton

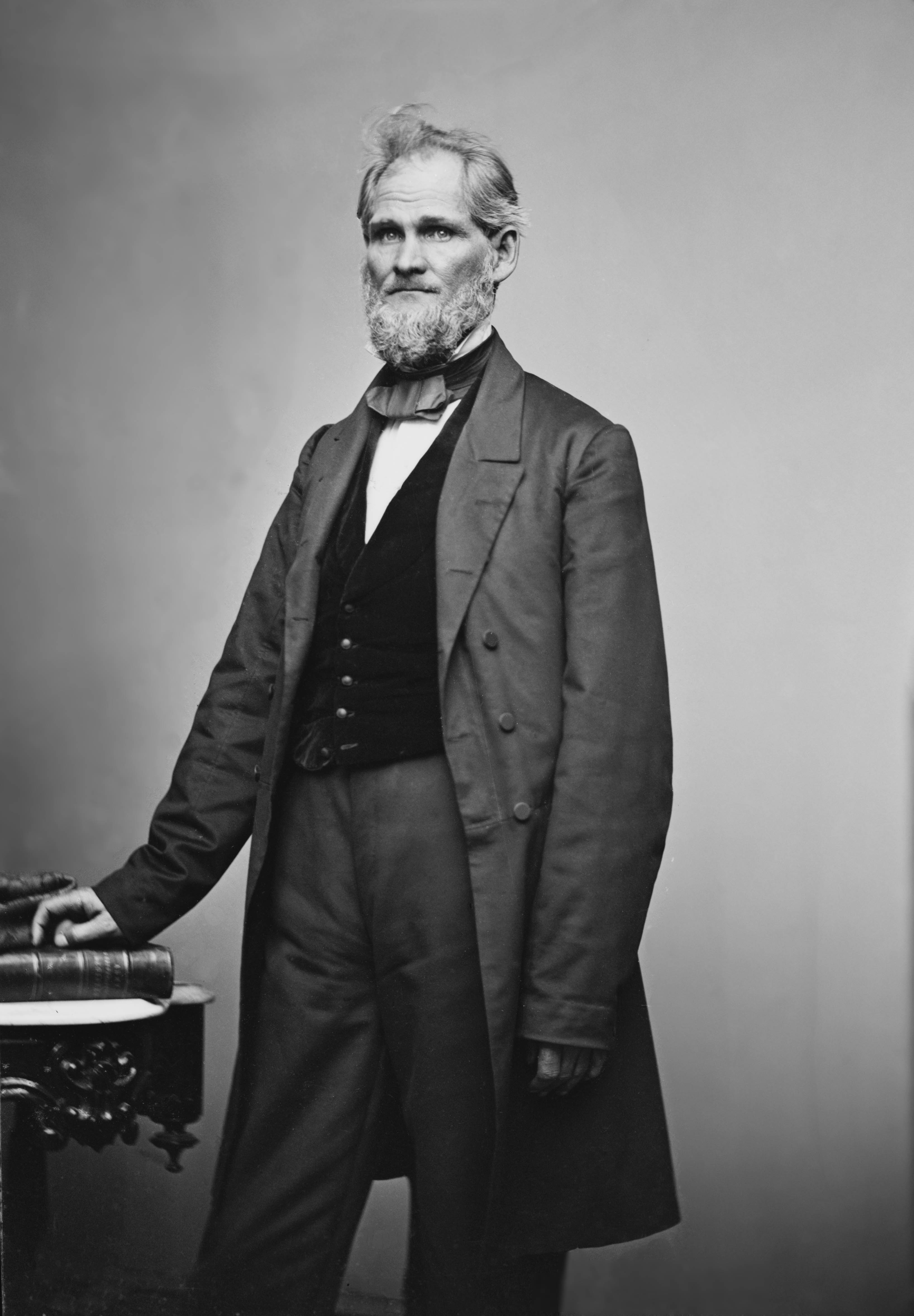
Lt. Col.
Henry S. Lane

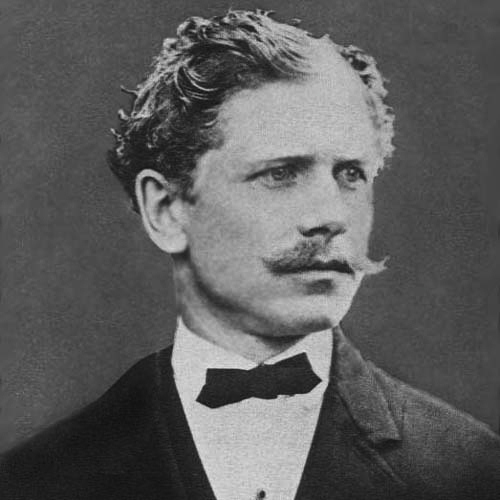
1st. Lt.
Ambrose Bierce

=== Training and support ===
Slightly more than 60 percent of Indiana's regiments mustered into service and trained at Indianapolis. Other camps for Union soldiers were established elsewhere in the state, including Fort Wayne, Gosport, Jeffersonville, Kendallville, Lafayette, Richmond, South Bend, Terre Haute, Wabash, and in LaPorte County.

Governor Morton was called the "Soldier's Friend" because of his efforts to equip, train, and care for Union soldiers in the field. Indiana's state government financed a large portion of the costs involved in preparing its regiments for war, including housing, feeding, and equipping them, before their assignment to the standing Union armies. To secure arms for Indiana's troops, the governor appointed purchasing agents to act on the state's behalf. Early in the war, for example, Robert Dale Owen purchased more than $891,000 in arms, clothing, blankets, and cavalry equipment for Indiana troops; the state government made additional purchases of arms and supplies exceeding $260,000. To provide ammunition, Morton established a state-owned arsenal at Indianapolis served the Indiana militia, home guard, and as a backup supply depot for the Union army. The state arsenal operated until April 1864, employing 700 at its peak; many of its employees were women. A federal arsenal was also established in Indianapolis in 1863.

The Indiana Sanitary Commission, created in 1862, and soldiers' aid societies throughout the state raised funds and gathered supplies for troops in the field. Hoosiers also provided other forms of support for soldiers and their families, including a Soldiers' Home and a Ladies' Home, and Orphans' Home to help meet the needs of Indiana's soldiers and their families as they passed through Indianapolis.

During the war some women took on the added responsibility of running family farms and businesses. Hoosier women also contributed to the war effort as nurses and volunteers in charitable organizations, most commonly the local Ladies' Aid Societies. In January 1863 Governor Morton and the Indiana Sanitary Commission began recruiting women to work as nurses in military hospitals and on hospital ships and transport trains in Indiana as well as the South; others served behind the lines at battlefields. It is not known how many women from Indiana became wartime nurses, but several died during their service, including Eliza George of Fort Wayne and Hannah Powell and Asinae Martin of Goshen. Oher women nurses who returned to their homes in Indiana following their service include Jane Chambers McKinney Graydon, Jane Merrill Ketcham, and Bettie Bates, all three from Indianapolis; Harriet Reese Colfax and Lois Dennett from Michigan City; Adelia Carter New, among the few women from Indiana who served at hospitals in the East; Amanda Way of Winchester; Mary F. Thomas from Richmond, who was trained as a physician; members of the Sisters of the Holy Cross; and members of the Sisters of Providence of Saint Mary of the Woods, among other women.

Wounded soldiers were cared for at Indiana facilities in Clark County (Port Fulton, near Jeffersonville and New Albany), Jefferson County (Madison), Knox County (Vincennes), Marion County (Indianapolis), Warrick County (Newburgh), and Vanderburgh County (Evansville). Jefferson General Hospital at Port Fulton, Indiana, now a part of present-day Jeffersonville, was briefly the third-largest hospital in the United States. Between 1864, when Jefferson General opened, and 1866, when it closed, the hospital treated 16,120 patients.

=== Prison camps ===
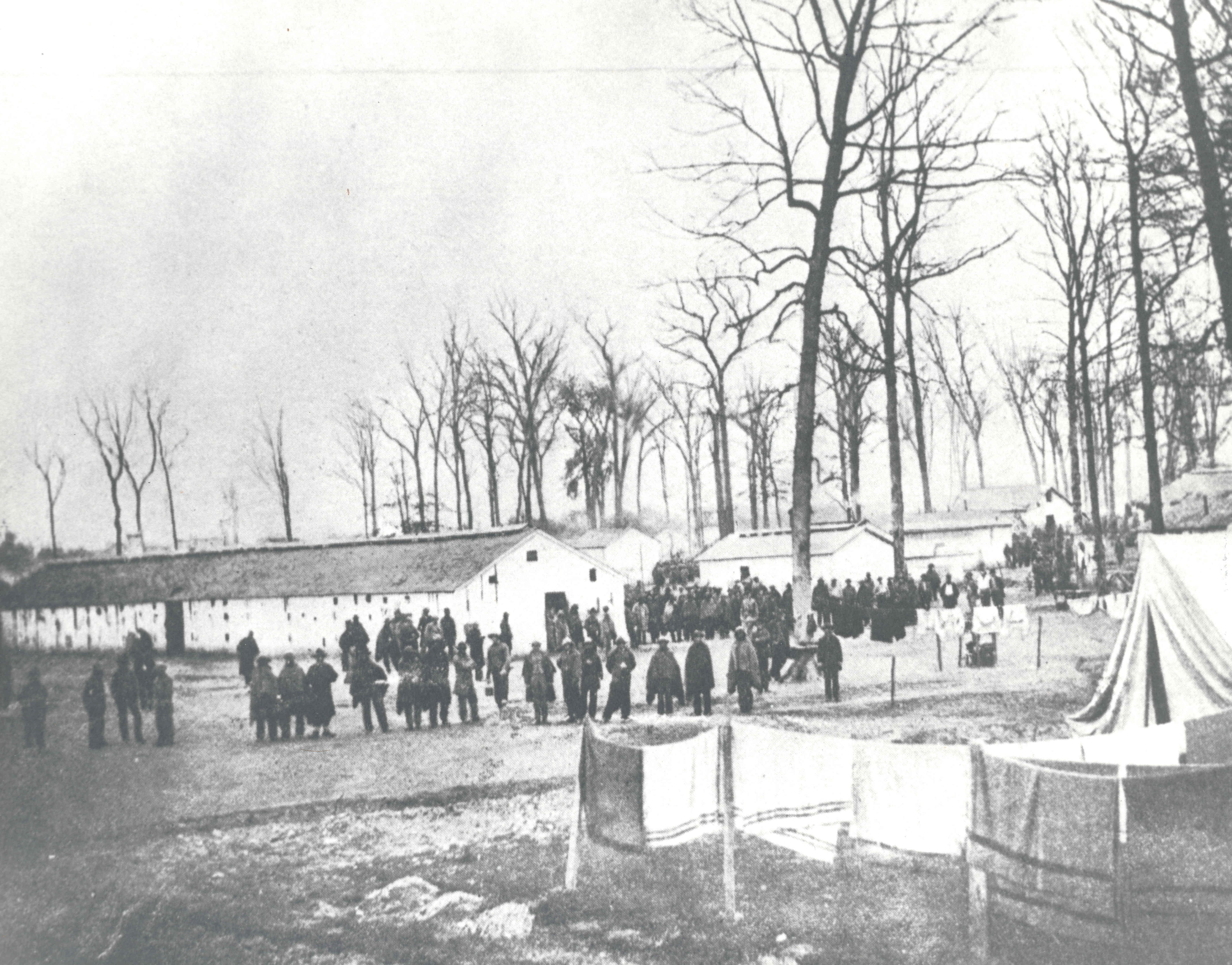
Camp Morton, c. 1863

Indianapolis was the site of Camp Morton, one of the Union's largest prisons for captured Confederate soldiers. Lafayette, Richmond, and Terre Haute, Indiana, occasionally held prisoners of war as well.

=== Military cemeteries ===
Two national military cemeteries were established in Indiana as a result of the war. In 1882 the federal government established in New Albany, Indiana, the New Albany National Cemetery, one of fourteen national cemeteries established that year. In 1866 the federal government authorized a national cemetery for Indianapolis; Crown Hill National Cemetery was established within the grounds of Crown Hill Cemetery, a privately owned cemetery northwest of downtown.

== Conflicts ==
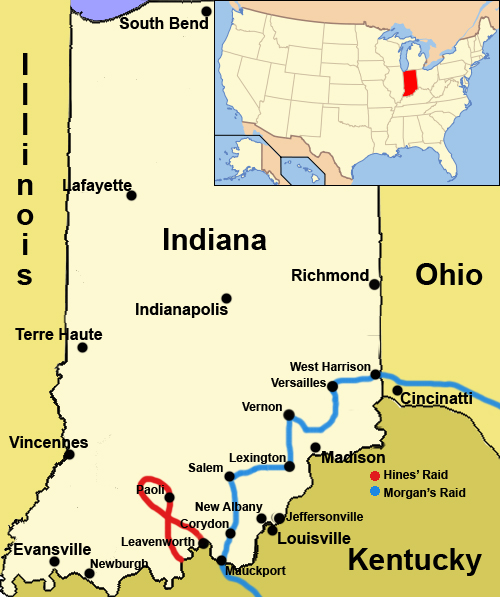
The Civil War in Indiana.

Indiana troops participated in 308 military engagements, the majority of them between the Mississippi River and the Appalachian Mountains. Soldiers from Indiana were present on most of the Civil War battlefields, beginning with the first engagement involving Hoosier troops at the Battle of Philippi (West Virginia) on June 3, 1861, to the Battle of Palmito Ranch (Texas) on May 13, 1865. Nearly all the fighting was outside of the state's boundaries. Only one significant conflict, known as Morgan's Raid, occurred on Indiana soil during the war. The raid, which caused a brief panic in Indianapolis and southern Indiana, was preceded by two minor incursions into Indiana.

=== Raids ===
On July 18, 1862, during the Newburgh Raid, Confederate officer Adam Johnson briefly captured Newburgh, Indiana, making it the first town in a Northern state to be captured during the American Civil War. Johnson and his men succeeded after convincing the town's Union garrison that they had cannon on the surrounding hills (they were merely camouflaged stovepipes). The raid convinced the federal government of the need to supply Indiana with a permanent force of regular Union Army soldiers to counter future raids.

On June 17, 1863, in preparation for a planned cavalry offensive by Confederate troops under the command of John Hunt Morgan, one of his officers, Captain Thomas Hines and approximately 80 men crossed the Ohio River to search for horses and support from Hoosiers in southern Indiana. During the minor incursion, which became known as Hines' Raid, local citizens and members of Indiana's home guard pursued the Confederates and succeeded in capturing most of them without a fight. Hines and a few of his men escaped across the river into Kentucky.

Morgan's Raid, the Confederate army's major incursion into Indiana, occurred a month after Hines' raid. On July 8, 1863, General Morgan crossed the Ohio River, landing at Mauckport, Indiana, with 2,400 troopers. Their arrival was initially contested by a small party from the Indiana Legion, who withdrew after Morgan's men began firing artillery from the river's southern shore. The state militia quickly retreated towards Corydon, Indiana, where a larger body was gathering to block Morgan's advance. The Confederates advanced rapidly on the town and engaged in the Battle of Corydon. After a brief but fierce fight, Morgan took command of high ground south of town, and Corydon's local militia and citizens promptly surrendered after Morgan's artillery fired two warning shots. Corydon was sacked, but little damage was done to its buildings. Morgan continued his raid north and burned most of the town of Salem.

When Morgan's movements appeared to be headed toward Indianapolis, panic spread through the capital city. Governor Morton had called up the state militia as soon as Morgan's intention to cross into the state was known, and more than 60,000 men of all ages volunteered to protect Indiana against Morgan's men. Morgan considered attacking Camp Morton, the prisoner-of-war camp in Indianapolis, to free more than 5,000 Confederate prisoners of war imprisoned there, but decided against it. Instead, his raiders turned abruptly east and began moving towards Ohio. With Indiana's militia in pursuit, Morgan's men continued to raid and pillage their way toward the Indiana-Ohio border, crossing into Ohio on July 13. By the time Morgan left Indiana, his raid had become a desperate attempt to escape to the South. He was captured on July 26 in Ohio.

=== Indiana regiments ===
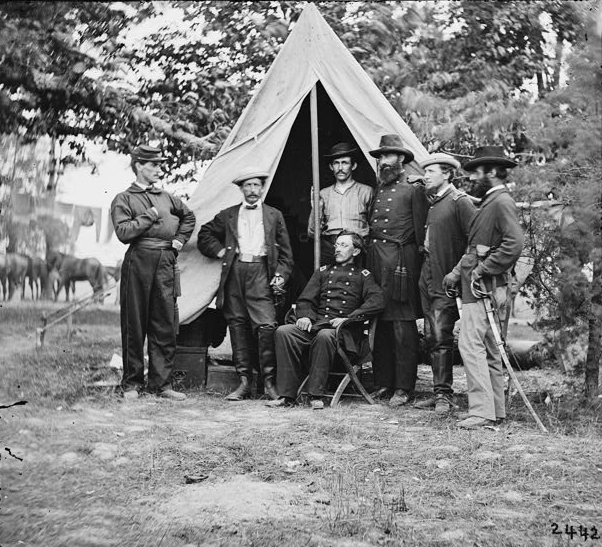
3rd Regiment Indiana Cavalry at camp

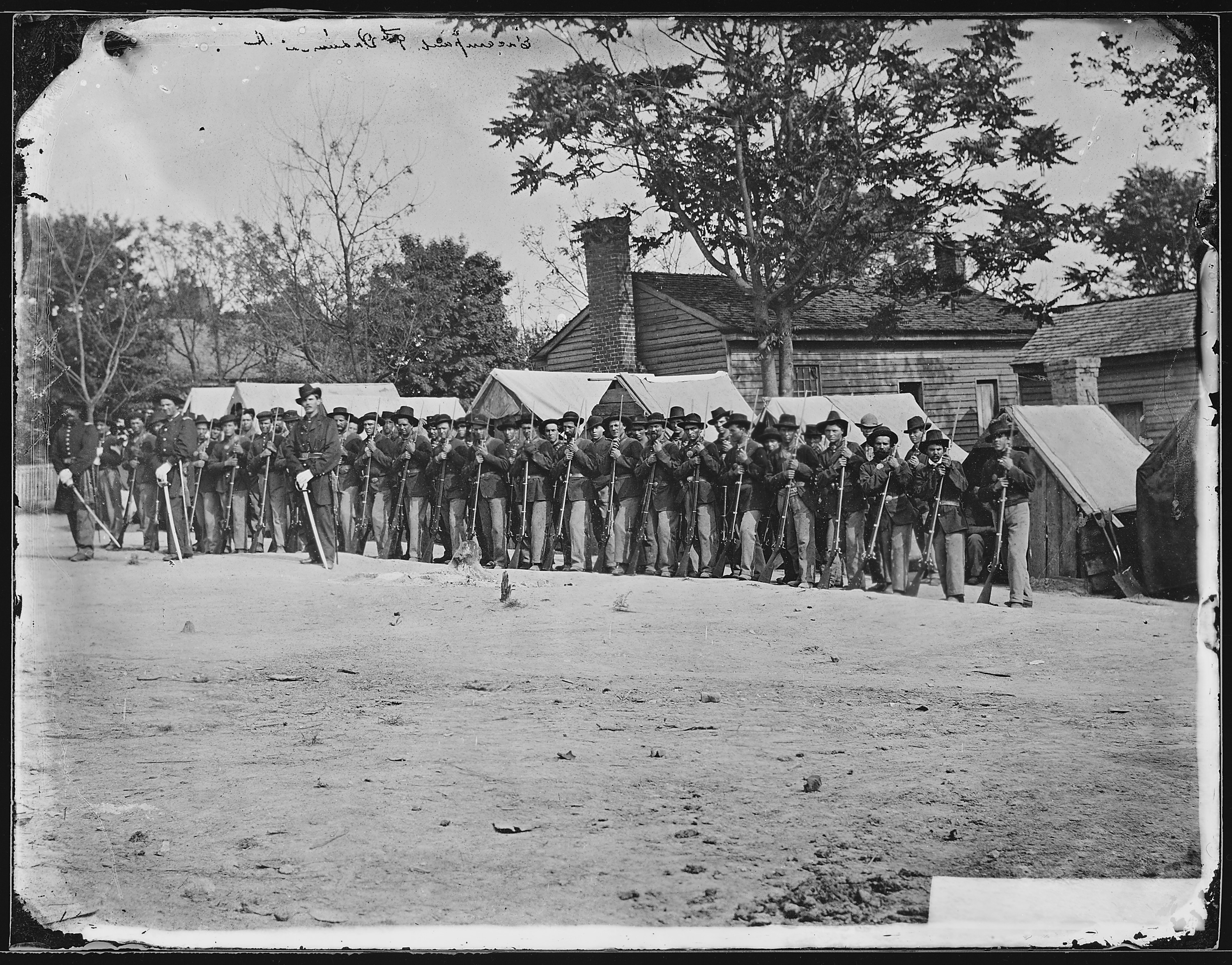
Company A 9th Indiana Infantry

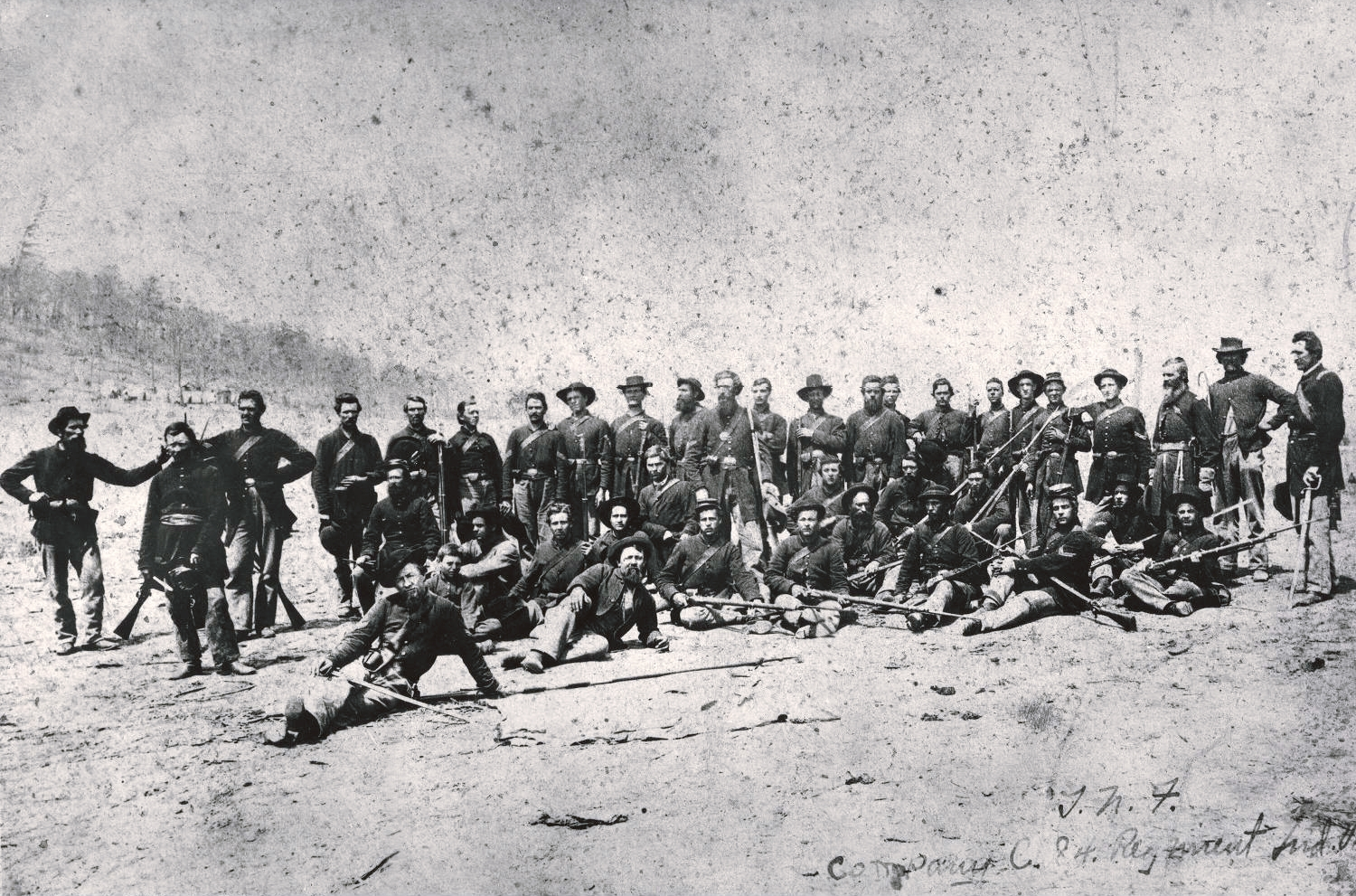
Company C 84th Indiana Infantry

Many of Indiana's regiments served with distinction in the war. The 19th Indiana Volunteer Infantry Regiment, 20th Indiana Infantry Regiment, and 27th Indiana Infantry Regiment suffered the highest casualties of the state's infantry regiments as a percentage of the regiment's total enrollment.

Indiana's first six regiments organized during the Civil War were the 6th, 7th, 8th, 9th, 10th, and 11th Indiana infantry regiments. The men in these regiments volunteered for three months of service at the start of the war, but their brief terms proved inadequate; most of these soldiers re-enlisted for three additional years of service.

By the end of 1861, forty-seven Indiana regiments had mustered into service; most of the men enlisted for terms of three years. The majority of the three-year regiments were deployed in the western theater. In 1862 another forty-one regiments from Indiana were mustered into service; about half were sent to the eastern theater and the other half remained in the west. During 1863 six more regiments were mustered into service to replace the casualties of the first two years' fighting, and on July 8, 1863, and additional thirteen temporary regiments were established during Morgan's Raid into southern Indiana. The men in these temporary regiments enlisted for terms of three months, but the regiments disbanded once the threat posed by Morgan's troops was gone. In 1864 twenty-one Indiana regiments mustered into service. As the fighting declined, most of Indiana's regiments mustered out of service by the end of 1864, but some continued to serve. During 1865 fourteen additional Indiana regiments were mustered into a year of service. On November 10, 1865, the 13th Regiment Indiana Cavalry became the state's final regiment to be mustered out of the U.S. Army.

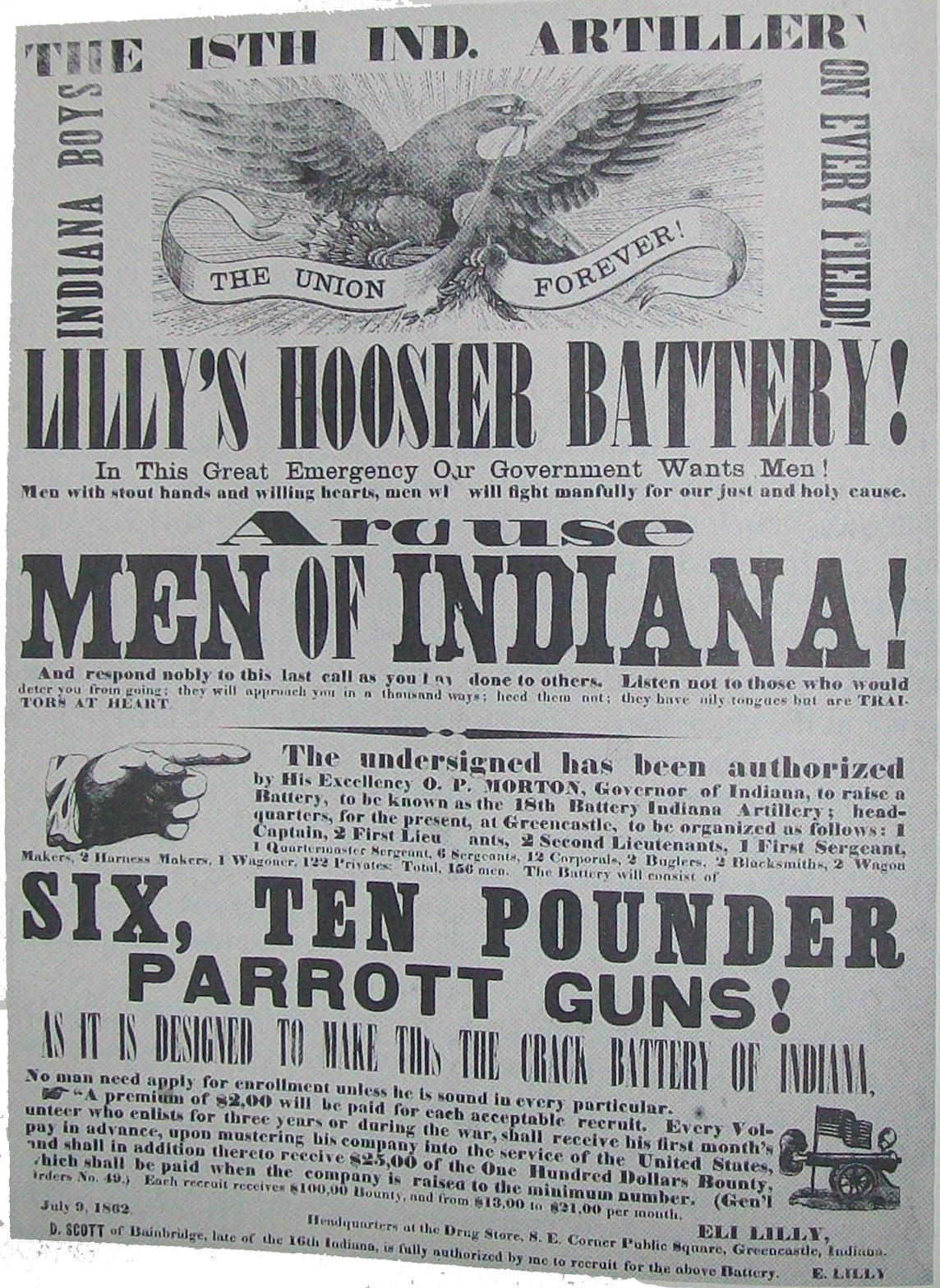
A recruitment poster used by Eli Lilly.

The 11th Indiana Infantry Regiment, also known as the Indiana Zouaves, under the command of Lew Wallace, was the first regiment organized in Indiana during the Civil War and the first one to march into battle. The 11th Indiana fought in the Battle of Fort Donelson, the Siege of Vicksburg, the second day of the Battle of Shiloh, and elsewhere. In 1861 the 9th Indiana Infantry Regiment became one of the first Hoosier regiments to see action in the war. The 9th Indiana fought in many major battles, including the Battle of Shiloh, the Battle of Stones River, the Atlanta campaign, and the Battle of Nashville, among others.

The 14th Indiana Infantry Regiment was nicknamed the "Gibraltar Brigade" for maintaining its position at the Battle of Antietam. It secured Cemetery Hill on the first day of the three-day fight at the Battle of Gettysburg, where it lost 123 of its men. The 19th Indiana Volunteer Infantry Regiment, part of the Iron Brigade, made critical contributions to some of the most important engagements of the war, including the Second Battle of Bull Run, but was almost completely destroyed in the Battle of Gettysburg, where it sustained 210 casualties. The 19th Indiana suffered the heaviest battle losses of any Indiana unit; 15.9 percent of its men were killed or mortally wounded during the war. The 27th Indiana Infantry Regiment earned the nickname "giants in the cornfield" at the Battle of Antietam. The regiment also fought at the Battle of Chancellorsville, the Battle of Gettysburg, and in the Atlanta campaign. The 27th Indiana's casualties were 15.3 percent of its total enrollment, nearly as many as the 19th Indiana.

Most of Indiana's regimental units were organized within towns or counties, but ethnic units were also formed, including the 32nd Indiana, a German-American infantry regiment, and the 35th Indiana, composed of Irish Americans. The 28th Regiment U.S. Colored Troops, formed at Indianapolis between December 24, 1863, and March 31, 1864, was the only black regiment formed in Indiana during the war. It trained at Indianapolis's Camp Fremont, near Fountain Square, and included 518 enlisted men who signed on for three years of service. The regiment lost 212 men during the conflict. The 28th participated in the Siege of Petersburg and at the Battle of the Crater, where twenty-two of its men were killed. At the end of the war the regiment served in Texas, where it mustered out of service on November 8, 1865.

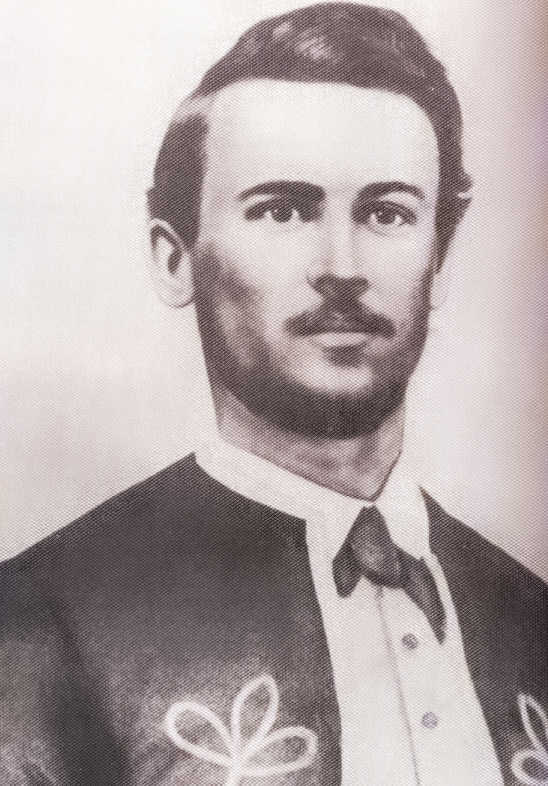
Pvt.John J. Williams, last battlefield casualty of the war

The last casualty of the Civil War was a Hoosier serving in the 34th Regiment Indiana Infantry. Private John J. Williams died at the Battle of Palmito Ranch on May 13, 1865.

== Politics ==
Hoosiers voted in favor of the Republicans in 1860, and in January 1861, Indiana's newly elected lieutenant governor, Oliver P. Morton, became governor after Henry S. Lane resigned from the office to take a vacant seat in the U.S. Senate. Hoosiers also helped Abraham Lincoln win the presidency in the 1860 election and voted in favor of his re-election in 1864. Although Lincoln won only 40 percent of the country's popular vote in the U.S. presidential election in 1860, he earned Indiana's 13 electoral votes with 51.09 percent of its popular vote, compared to Stephen Douglas's 42.44 percent, John Breckenridge's 4.52 percent, and John Bell's 1.95 percent. In the 1864 presidential election, Lincoln once again carried the state, this time by a wider margin, earning Indiana's electoral votes with 53.6 percent of the state's popular vote compared to George McClellan's 46.4 percent.

As one of Lincoln's "war governors", Morton and the president maintained a close alliance throughout the war; however, as war casualties mounted, Hoosiers began to doubt the necessity of war and many became concerned over the increase in governmental power and the loss of personal freedom, which resulted in major conflicts between the state's Republicans and Democrats.

=== Southern influence ===
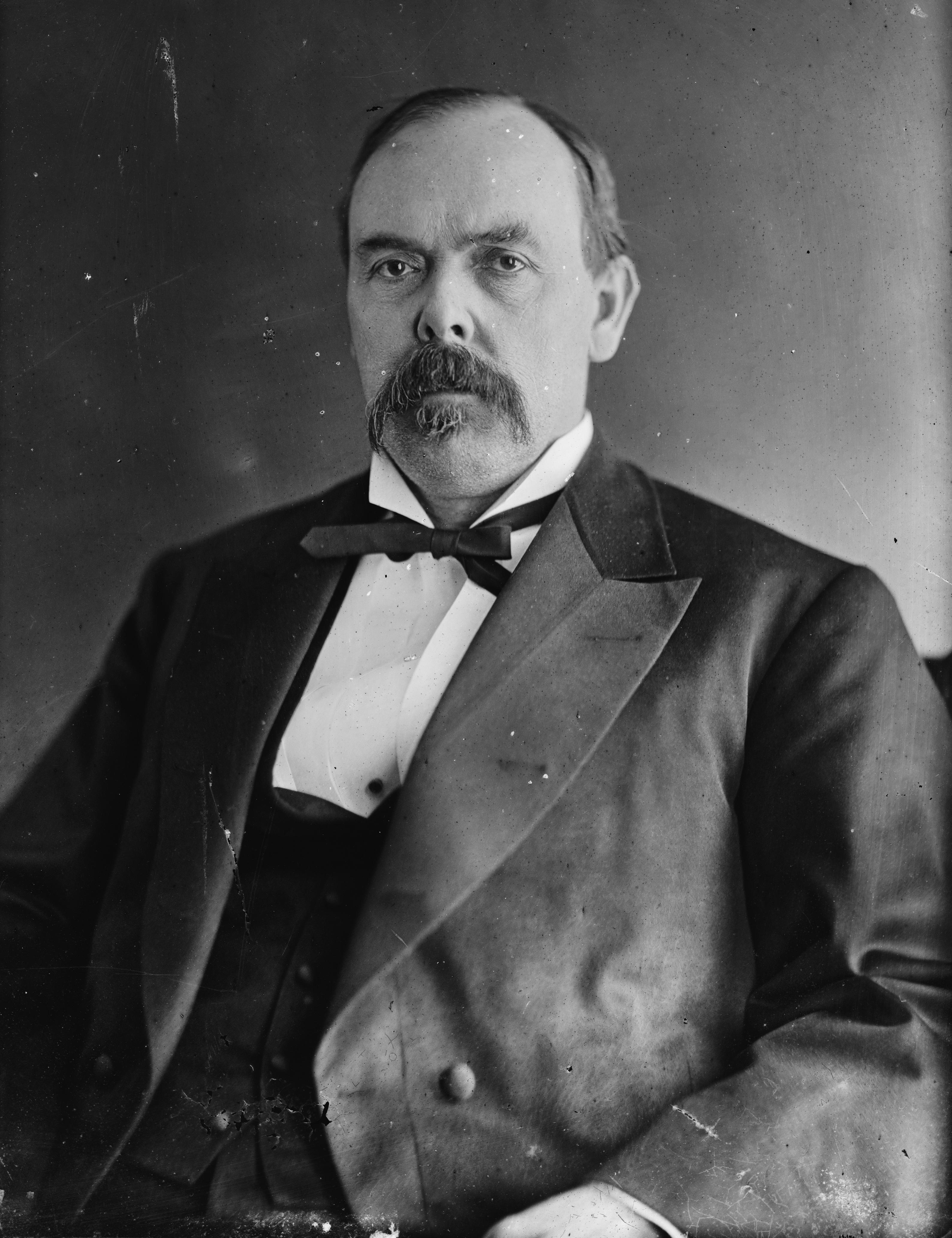
Governor, Congressman and Senator Oliver H.P. Morton

The Civil War era showed the extent of the South's influence on Indiana. Much of southern and central Indiana had strong ties to the South. Many of Indiana's early settlers had come from the Confederate state of Virginia and from Kentucky. Governor Morton once complained to President Lincoln that "no other free state is so populated with southerners", which Morton believed kept him from being as forceful as he wanted to be.

Due to their location across the Ohio River from Louisville, Kentucky, the Indiana cities of Jeffersonville, New Albany, and Port Fulton saw increased trade and military activity. Some of this increase was due to Kentucky's desire to stay neutral in the war. In addition, Kentucky was home to many Confederate sympathizers. Military bases in southern Indiana were needed to support Union operations against Confederates in Kentucky, and it was safer to store war supplies in towns on the north side of the river. Jeffersonville served as an important military depot for Union troops heading south. Towards the end of the war, Port Fulton was home to the third-largest hospital in the United States, Jefferson General Hospital.

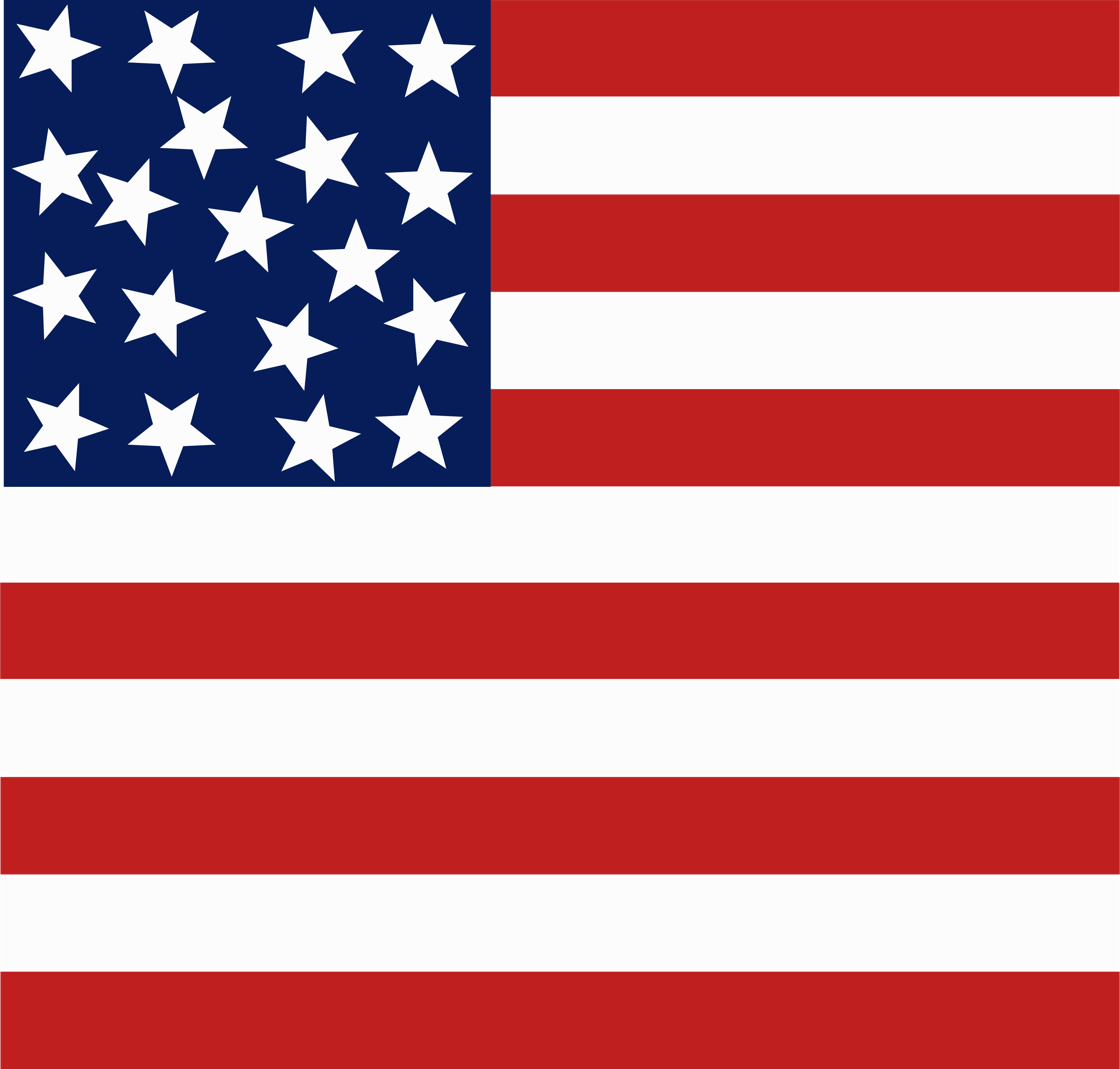
Digital remake of a flag flown by a Confederate sympathizer. The 11 stripes stand for the 9 states + 2 border states that were loyal to the Confederacy.

In 1861, Kentucky's governor Beriah Magoffin refused to allow pro-Union forces to mobilize in his state and issued a similar order regarding Confederate forces. Governor Morton, who repeatedly came to the military rescue of Kentucky's pro-Union government during the war and became known as the "Governor of Indiana and Kentucky" allowed Kentuckians to form Union regiments on Indiana soil. Kentucky troops, especially from Louisville, which included the 5th Kentucky Infantry Regiment and others, assembled and trained at Indiana's Camp Joe Holt. Camp Joe Holt was established in Clarksville, Indiana, between Jeffersonville and New Albany.

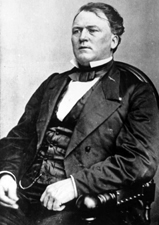
Indiana Senator Jesse Bright, a Copperhead, was expelled from the U.S. Senate for disloyalty.

Jesse D. Bright, who represented Indiana in the United States Senate, had been a leader among the state's Democrats for several years prior to the outbreak of the war. In January 1862, Bright was expelled from the Senate on allegations of disloyalty to the Union. He had written a letter of introduction for an arms merchant addressed to "His Excellency, Jefferson Davis, President of the Confederation." In the letter, Bright offered the merchant's services as a firearms supplier. Bright's Senate replacement was Joseph A. Wright, a pro-Union Democrat and former Indiana governor. As of 2015, Bright was the last senator to be expelled by the Senate.

=== Political conflict ===
Hoosiers cooperated in support of the war effort at its outset, but political differences soon erupted into the "most violent political battles" in the state's history. The major debates, which also led to violence, related to the issues of slavery and emancipation; military service for African Americans; and the draft.

On April 24, 1861, Morton addressed a special session of the Indiana General Assembly to obtain the legislature's approval to borrow and spend funds to purchase arms and supplies for Indiana's troops. Morton also urged Indiana's legislators to set aside party considerations for the duration of the war and unite in defense of the Union, but the Republicans and Democrats did not cooperate for long. Initially, the Democratic-controlled legislature was supportive of Morton's measures and passed the legislation he requested. After the state legislature adjourned in May, however, some of the state's prominent Democrats changed their opinion about the war. In January 1862 the Democrats clarified their position at a state convention chaired by Thomas A. Hendricks. Indiana's Democrats stated their support for the integrity of the Union and the war effort, but opposed emancipation of blacks and the abolition of slavery.

After the elections in the fall of 1862, Governor Morton feared that the legislature's Democratic majority would attempt to hinder the war effort, reduce his authority, and vote to secede from the Union. After the legislative session convened in 1863, all but four Republican legislators stayed away from Indianapolis to prevent the general assembly from attaining the quorum it needed to pass legislation, including funding the state government or making tax provisions. This rapidly led to a crisis as the state government began to run out of money to conduct its business and was nearly bankrupt. Going beyond his constitutional powers, Morton solicited millions of dollars in federal and private loans to avert the crisis. To obtain funds to run the state government, Morton turned to James Lanier, a wealthy banker from Madison, Indiana. On two occasions, Lanier provided the state with more than $1 million (USD) in unsecured loans. Morton's move was successful, and he was able to fund the state government and the war effort in Indiana. There was little the legislature could do but watch.

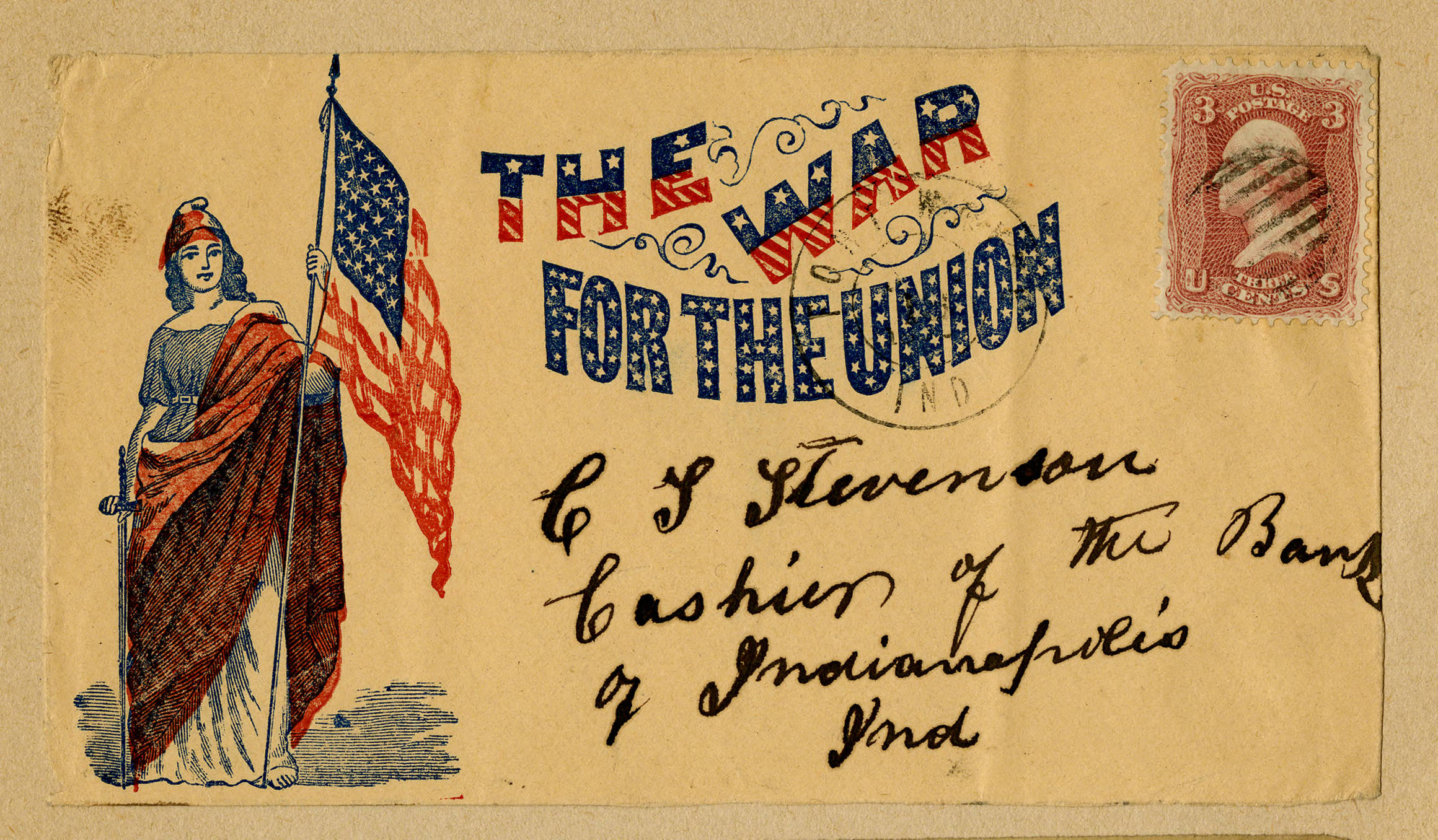
An example of Civil War-era envelopes printed with colorful, patriotic illustrations, which features a female figure holding the United States flag and the words "The War for the Union." It was mailed to a C.T. Stevenson, cashier of the Bank of Indianapolis, Indiana.

Indiana's political polarity continued to worsen after the Emancipation Proclamation (1863) made freeing the slaves a war goal. Many of the formerly pro-war Democrats moved to openly oppose the war, and Governor Morton began a crackdown on dissidents. During one notorious incident in May 1863, the governor had soldiers disrupt a Democratic state convention in Indianapolis, causing what would later be referred to as the Battle of Pogue's Run. No regular session of the Indiana General Assembly was convened until June 1865.

While most of the state was decidedly pro-Union, a group of Southern sympathizers known as the Knights of the Golden Circle had a strong presence in southern Indiana. The burning of The Walnut Ridge Friends Meeting House was attributed to KGC from Shelby County in 1864 for Anti-Abolitionist or Southern sentiment. The group proved enough of a threat that General Lew Wallace, commander of Union forces in the region, spent considerable time countering their activities. By June 1863, the group was successfully broken up. Many Golden Circle members were arrested without formal charges, the pro-Confederate press was prevented from printing anti-war material, and the writ of habeas corpus was denied to anyone suspected of disloyalty. In reaction to Governor Morton's actions against dissenters, Indiana's Democrats Party called him a "dictator" and an "underhanded mobster;" Republicans countered that the Democrats were using treasonable and obstructionist tactics in the conduct of the war.

Confederate special agent Thomas Hines went to French Lick in June 1863, seeking support for Confederate General John Hunt Morgan's eventual raid into Indiana. Hines met with Sons of Liberty "major general" William A. Bowles, to inquire if Bowles could offer any support for Morgan's upcoming raid. Bowles claimed he could raise a force of 10,000, but before the deal was finalized, Hines was informed that a Union force was approaching and fled the state. As a result, Bowles provided no support for Morgan's raiders, which caused Morgan to harshly treat anyone in Indiana who claimed to be sympathetic to the Confederacy.

Large-scale support for the Confederacy among Golden Circle members and Southern Hoosiers in general declined after Morgan's Confederate raiders ransacked many homes bearing the banners of the Golden Circle, despite their proclaimed support for the Confederates. As Confederate Colonel Basil W. Duke recalled after the incident, "The Copperheads and Vallandighammers fought harder than the others" against Morgan's raiders. When Hoosiers failed to support Morgan's men in significant numbers, Governor Morton slowed his crackdown on Confederate sympathizers, theorizing that because they had failed to come to Morgan's aid in large numbers, they would similarly fail to aid a larger invasion.

Although raids into Indiana were infrequent, smuggling goods into Confederate territory was common, especially in the early days of the war when the Union army had not yet pushed the front lines far to the south of the Ohio River. New Albany and Jeffersonville, Indiana, were origination points for many Northern goods smuggled into the Confederacy. The Cincinnati Daily Gazette pressured both towns to stop trading with the South, especially with Louisville, because Kentucky's proclaimed neutrality was perceived as sympathetic to the South. A fraudulent steamboat company was established to ply the Ohio River between Madison, Indiana, and Louisville; its boat, the Masonic Gem, made regular trips to Confederate ports.

=== Southern sympathizers ===
While it is believed that they were not particularly numerous, the exact number of Hoosiers to serve in Confederate armies is unknown. It is likely that most traveled to Kentucky to join Confederate regiments formed in that state. Former U.S. Army officer Francis A. Shoup, who briefly led the Indianapolis Zouave militia unit, left for Florida prior to the war, and ultimately become a Confederate brigadier general.

=== Republican legislative majority ===
After the elections in 1864 the state's Republican legislative majority arrived at a critical turning point, as the North was slowly tightening its blockade of the South. The new Republican-controlled legislature fully supported Morton's policies and worked to meet the state's commitments to the war effort. In 1865 the Indiana General Assembly validated the loans Morton had secured to run the state government, assumed them as state debt, and commended Morton for his actions during the interim.

== Aftermath ==
News of Confederate General Robert E. Lee's surrender at Appomattox Courthouse, Virginia, reached Indianapolis at 11 p.m. on April 9, 1865, causing immediate and enthusiastic public celebrations that the Indianapolis Journal characterized as "demented". A week later, the community's excitement turned to sadness when news of Lincoln's assassination arrived on April 15. Lincoln's funeral train passed through the capital city on April 30, and 100,000 people attended his bier at the Indiana Statehouse.

=== Economic ===
The Civil War forever altered Indiana's economy. Despite hardships during the war, Indiana's economic situation improved. Farmers received higher prices for their agricultural products, railroads and commercial businesses thrived in the state's cities and towns, and manpower shortages gave laborers more bargaining power. The war also helped establish a national banking system to replace state-chartered banking institutions; by 1862 there were thirty-one national banks in the state. Wartime prosperity was particularly evident in Indianapolis, whose population more than doubled during the war, reaching 45,000 at the end of 1864.

Increased wartime manufacturing and industrial growth in Hoosier cities and towns ushered in a new era of economic prosperity. By the end of the war, Indiana had become less rural that it previously had been. Overall, the war caused Indiana's industries to grow exponentially, although the state's southern counties experienced growth after the war at a slower rate than its other counties. The state's population shifted to central and northern Indiana as new industries and cities began to develop around the Great Lakes and the railroad depots erected during the war. In 1876 Colonel Eli Lilly opened a new pharmaceutical laboratory in Indianapolis, founding what later became Eli Lilly and Company. Indianapolis was also the wartime home of Richard Gatling, inventor of the Gatling Gun, one of the world's first machine guns. Although his invention was used in some Civil War-era campaigns, it was not fully adopted for use by the U.S. Army until 1866. Charles Conn, another war veteran, founded C. G. Conn Ltd. in Elkhart, Indiana, where the manufacturing of musical instruments became a new industry for the town.

Post-war development was different in southern Indiana. The state's commerce along the Ohio River was reduced during the war, especially after the closure of the Mississippi River to commercial trade with the South and increased competition from the state's expanding railroad network. Some of Indiana's river towns, such as Evansville, recovered by providing transport to Union troops across the Ohio River, but others did not. Before the war, New Albany was the largest city in the state, primarily due to its commerce with the South, but its trade dwindled during the war. After the war much of Indiana viewed New Albany as too friendly to the South. New Albany's formerly robust steamboat-building industry ended in 1870; the last steamboat built in New Albany was named the Robert E. Lee. New Albany never regained its pre-war stature; its population leveled off at 40,000, and only the antebellum, early-Victorian Mansion Row district remains from its boom period.

=== Political ===
When the war ended, the state's Democrats were upset about their wartime treatment by the Republicans, but they staged a quick comeback. Indiana became the first state after the Civil War to elect a Democratic governor, Thomas A. Hendricks. His rise to the governor's office initiated a period of Democratic control in the state that reversed many of the political gains made by the Republican Party during the war.

Indiana's U.S. senators were strong supporters of the radical Reconstruction plans proposed by Congress. Senators Oliver Morton, who was elected to the Senate after serving as Indiana's governor, and Schuyler Colfax voted in favor of President Andrew Johnson's impeachment. Morton was especially disappointed in Congress's failure to remove him.

When the South returned to firm Democratic control at the end of the 1870s, Indiana, which was closely split between the two parties, was one of a few key swing state that often decided the balance of power in Congress and the presidency. Five Hoosier politicians were vice-presidential nominees on the major party tickets held between 1868 and 1916, as the nation's political parties vied for the support of the state's electorate. In 1888, at the height of the state's post-war political influence, former Civil War general Benjamin Harrison was elected president, and served in that capacity from 1889 to 1893.

=== Social ===
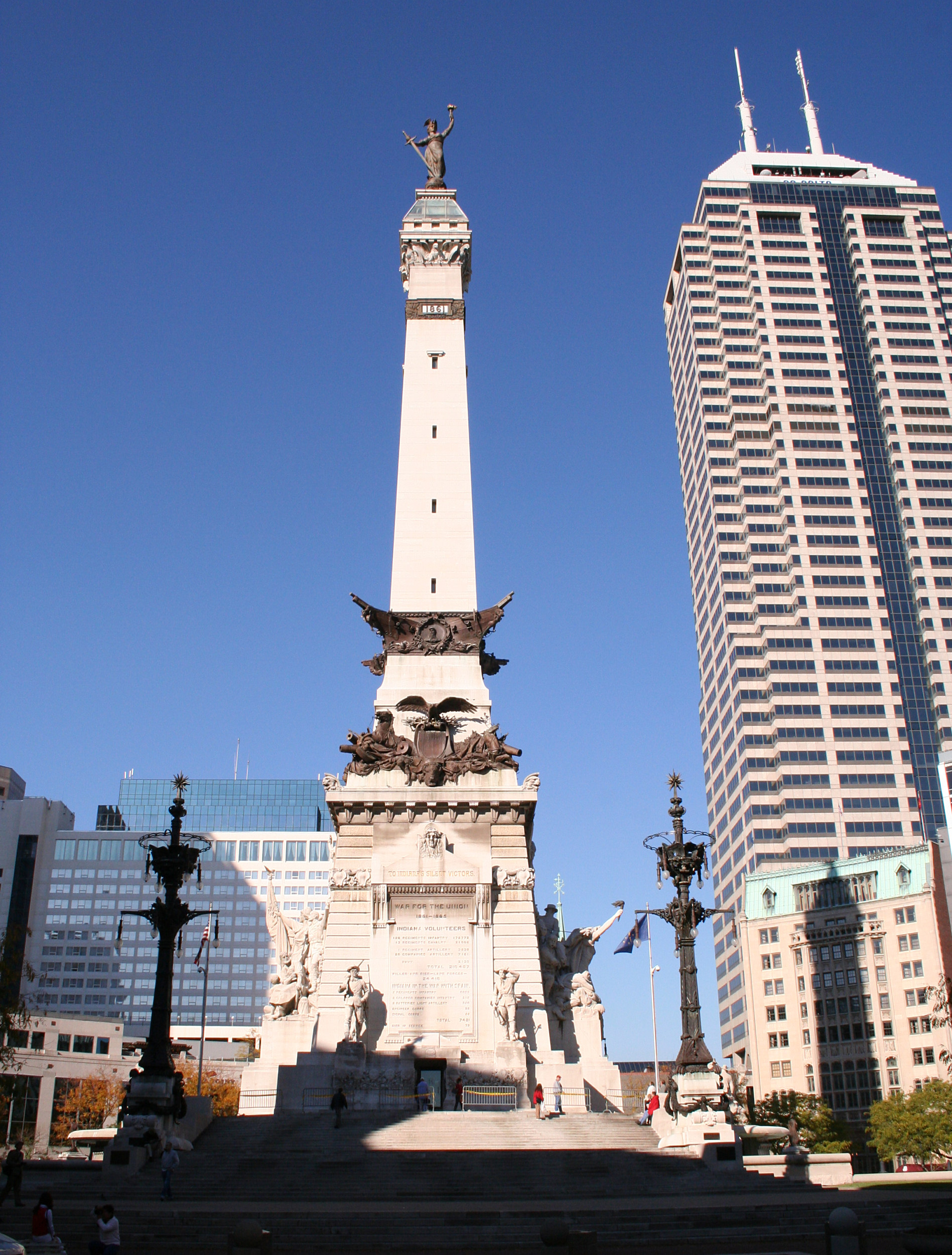
The Circle in Indianapolis was built to honor the war dead.

More than half of the state's households, based on an average family size of four persons, contributed a family member to fight in the war, making the effects of the conflict widely felt throughout the state. More Hoosiers died in the Civil War than in any other conflict. Although twice as many Hoosiers served in World War II, almost twice as many died in the Civil War. After the war, veterans programs were initiated to help wounded soldiers with housing, food, and other basic needs. In addition, orphanages and asylums were established to assist women and children.

After the war, some women who had been especially active in supporting the war on the home front turned their organizational skills to other concerns, especially prohibition and woman suffrage. In 1874, for example, Zerelda Wallace, the wife of former Indiana governor David Wallace and stepmother of General Lew Wallace, became a founder of the Indiana chapter of the Woman's Christian Temperance Union and served as its first president.

=== Memorials ===
Numerous war memorials were erected to honor the Indiana veterans of the Civil War. Among the largest in Indiana is the Soldiers' and Sailors' Monument in downtown Indianapolis. After two decades of discussion, construction for the monument began in 1888; it was finally completed in 1901.

== See also ==
- Indianapolis in the American Civil War
- Union (American Civil War)
