= Jefferson General Hospital =

Coordinates: 38°16′56″N 85°43′16″W

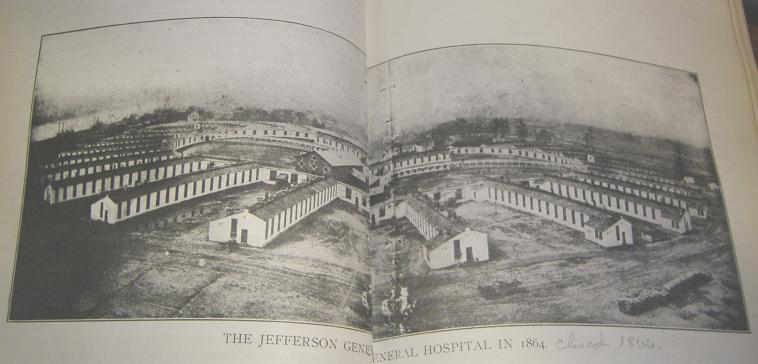
Jefferson General Hospital

Jefferson General Hospital was the third-largest hospital during the American Civil War, located at Port Fulton, Indiana (now part of Jeffersonville, Indiana) and was active between February 21, 1864, and December 1866. The land was owned by U.S. Senator from Indiana Jesse D. Bright. Bright was sympathetic to the Confederates, and was expelled from his position as Senator in 1862. Union authorities took the property without compensation, similar to what happened at Arlington National Cemetery.

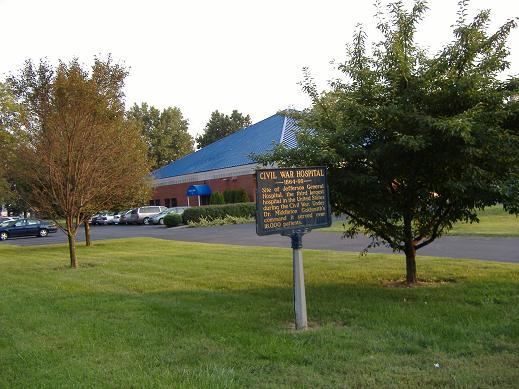
The property today

The hospital was built to replace the existing hospital at Camp Joe Holt. 27 buildings, each 175' by 20', encircled a corridor that was 0.5 mile in circumference. 24 of the buildings were wards, each having 53 beds for patients and one for the ward master. Each ward had 4 large cast iron stoves, which warmed the building. Inside the perimeter made by the buildings was a chapel with reading rooms, post office, drug & instrument house, and a "dead house".

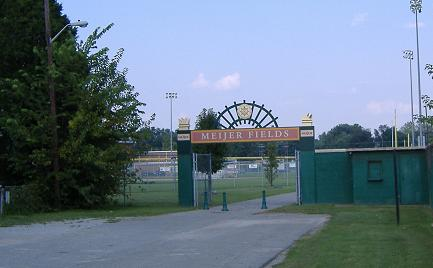
Meijer Fields, formerly Shannon Park, built above the Civil War cemetery

Throughout the period the hospital was in use, Dr. Middleton Goldsmith was its Chief Surgeon, assisted by Chief Nurse Mrs. Arbuckle. The executive office, the second command, was held by four different people. In total, 16,120 people were treated at the hospital. Those that died while in the hospital were buried down the hill, where Meijer Fields now lies.

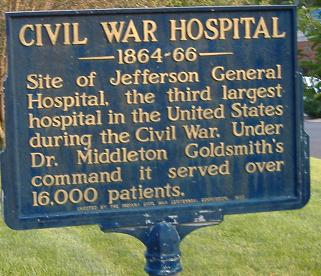
Historical marker closeup

After the hospital closed, the buildings were intended for a soldier's home, and given to the state of Indiana for that purpose. After two months possession, the proposed home was instead built near Knightstown, and the buildings returned to the US Government. Until 1874 it was used as storehouses for army materials such as clothing and blankets. Eventually, a man named James Holt came into ownership of the property. At his death he bequeathed the property to his Masonic Lodge, Clark Lodge #40 as a Masonic orphans home around 1915. In 1962, the Indiana Historical Bureau placed a state historical marker on the property. Thirty-three years later, Clark Lodge used the property to build their new Masonic temple, as the old one was difficult to maintain and its stairs inhibited older members from participating in lodge meetings. The groundbreaking was the last weekend of March, and the building was used beginning in November. As there were seldom any Masonic orphans to house, the orphanage building was sold in 2006, with the proceeds going for college scholarships to those that have Masonic heritage.

== See also ==
- Indiana in the American Civil War
- Louisville in the American Civil War
