= Howard Steamboat Museum =

Historic house in Indiana, United States

- Howard Home
- U.S. National Register of Historic Places
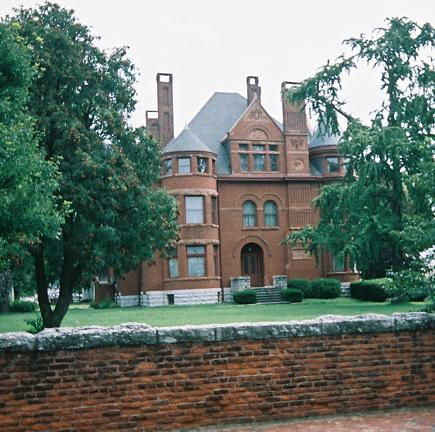
- Side view of Howard Steamboat Museum

- Location within Clark County, Indiana Location within Indiana Location within the United States
- Location: 1101 E. Market St., Jeffersonville, Indiana
- Coordinates: 38°16′42″N 85°43′31″W
- Area: 1.2 acres (0.49 ha)
- Built: 1890
- Architect: Drach and Thomas
- Architectural style: Richardsonian Romanesque
- NRHP reference No.: 73000031
- Added to NRHP: July 5, 1973

The Howard Steamboat Museum, or the Howard National Steamboat Museum, is located in Jeffersonville, Indiana, across from Louisville, Kentucky. Housed in the Howard Family mansion, it features items related to steamboat history and specifically, the Howard Shipyards of Jeffersonville. The building is listed on the National Register of Historic Places.

== Origin ==
The home was built in 1890 by Edmonds J. Howard, who inherited the family shipyard from his father James Howard. James founded the Howard Ship Yards, both in what was then Port Fulton, Indiana. It cost $100,000 to build the 22-room, 15,000 square foot, 3-floor Richardsonian Romanesque style red brick structure. Still within the museum are gasoliers that operate on electricity and natural gas, carvings, arches and a grand staircase that reflect the wealth Edmonds Howard had. The house features 15 different types of wood and themed rooms, such as a Moorish music parlor and a library. The museum features 90% original furnishings, many of which were purchased at the 1893 World's Columbian Exposition held in Chicago. As the Howards prided themselves on their hulls, a large collection of the half-breadths is displayed on the property. It was listed on the National Register of Historic Places in 1973 as the Howard Home.

The New York architectural firm of Drach and Thomas designed the house, while a local man, Arthur Loomis, supervised the project. They chose the popular Richardsonian Romanesque style, while including exterior features such as red brick cladding and stained-glass windows. Keeping with the theme of the Howard family business, along with other boat-related features they installed a stairway fully copied from the stairway of the steamboat J. M. White.

The Howard Shipyards built over 1100 river vessels in their 107 years of operation. In 1941, they sold the yard to the U.S. Navy to build ships for World War II, and in 1947 the yard was purchased by the Jeffersonville Boat and Machine Company, which had done the work for the Navy during the war. In 1964, they officially changed their name to Jeffboat, and it remained in business until the end of May, 2018. It had been considered the largest and oldest boatbuilding and repair yard in the inland waterway.

== Museum ==
On March 17, 1971, a fire broke out in the museum. Since much of the building saw minor damage, and other areas were able to be restored, the museum reopened the next year. In 2016, the museum began renovation of its Carriage House, the building where the Howards lived while their mansion was under construction, turning it into a rental venue.

== Gallery ==
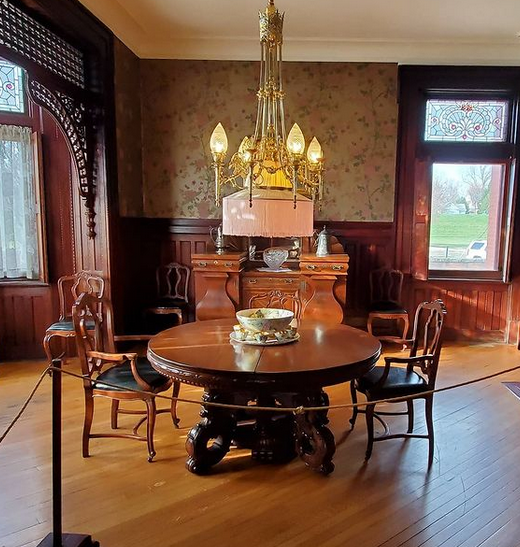
Dining Room

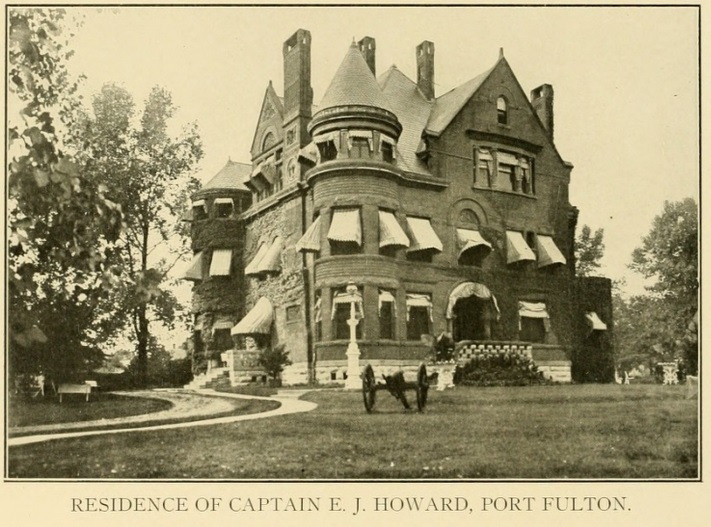
The museum circa 1909

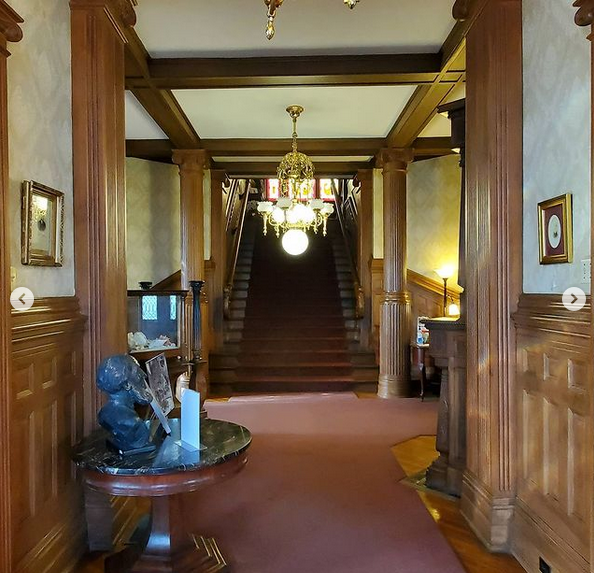
Stairway fashioned after the steamboat J. M. White

== See also ==
- Henry French House
- List of attractions and events in the Louisville metropolitan area
- List of maritime museums in the United States
- National Register of Historic Places listings in Clark County, Indiana
