= Henry French House =

Historic house in Indiana, United States

- U.S. National Register of Historic Places
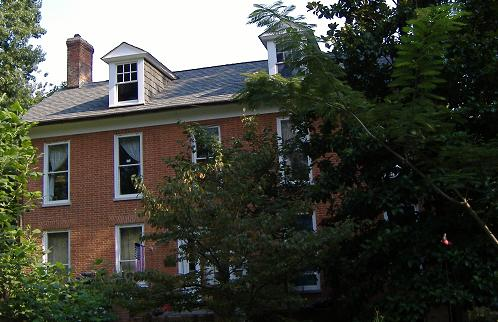

- Location within Clark County, Indiana Location within Indiana Location within the United States
- Location: 217 E. High St., Jeffersonville, Indiana
- Coordinates: 38°16′49″N 85°43′16″W
- Area: less than one acre
- Built: 1832
- Architectural style: Colonial Revival, Federal, I-house
- NRHP reference No.: 89000772
- Added to NRHP: June 29, 1989

The Henry French House, also known as the Salmon-French House, is a historic house located in the Port Fulton area of Jeffersonville, Indiana, United States. It was built about 1832, and is a two-story, Federal style brick dwelling with a rear ell added about 1839 to form an I-house. It has some Colonial Revival style design elements.

== Henry French ==
Henry French (born December 19, 1812, in Philadelphia – May 4, 1878) was one of the first steamboat builders in the area. Between himself, his father Daniel French, and his brothers William and George, twenty steamboats were built at Port Fulton. Eventually, his business was swallowed by the larger Howard enterprise.

== Today ==
In 1989, the house was added to the National Register of Historic Places. It is a private residence, and the current occupants have renovated it in a fashion similar to its original state.

== See also ==
- Howard Steamboat Museum, which is located a few blocks from the Henry French House
