= Jeffersonville Township Public Library =

Library system in Indiana, United States

Coordinates: 38°16′32″N 85°44′26″W

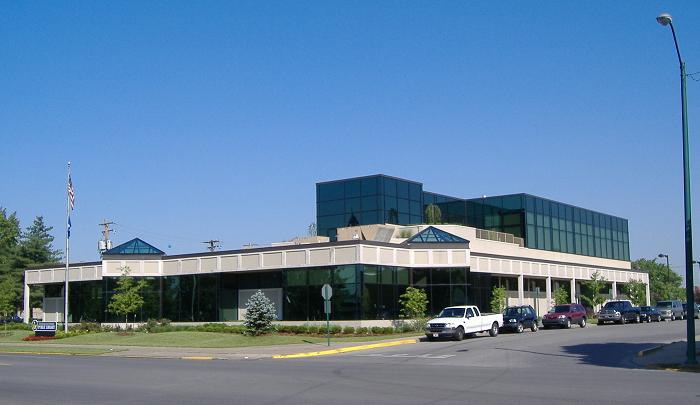
- Main library location in downtown Jeffersonville
- Location: Jeffersonville, Indiana
- Established: 1900
- Branches: 2

Access and use
- Population served: 70,000

Other information
- Director: Libby Pollard
- Employees: 45
- Website: http://jefflibrary.org

The Jeffersonville Township Public Library is a public library system in Jeffersonville, Indiana, United States comprising two locations: the main library at 211 East Court Avenue in Jeffersonville and the Clarksville Branch at 1312 Eastern Boulevard in Clarksville, Indiana. The rest of Clark County, Indiana is served by the Charlestown-Clark County Public Library system, with which the Jeffersonville library has a reciprocal borrowing agreement.

== History ==
A workingmen's library was established in Jeffersonville sometime before 1850 out of funds allocated to create such libraries in Indiana after the death of William Maclure in 1840. This small collection formed the foundation of the Jeffersonville township library, which was created sometime after 1852 when the Indiana General Assembly passed an act regarding the establishment of public libraries. However, this library collection was located in the office of the township trustee and was not convenient for the majority of people in the township. so in 1897 Hannah Zulauf led a group of women representing the various women's literary clubs in Jeffersonville to canvass money to create the Jeffersonville Township Public Library Association and have the collection transferred into their care. Red tape prevented the transfer until 1900, and on December 17, 1900, the Jeffersonville Township Public Library opened to the public on the second floor of the Citizens National Bank with Miss Bertha Poindexter as the librarian.

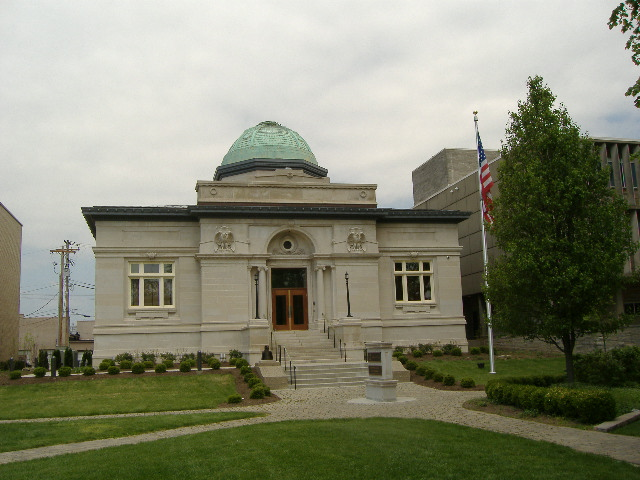
The original Jeffersonville Township Public Library building located in Warder Park. It was a Carnegie Library.

The library collection rapidly outgrew this small space and so in 1902 Hannah Zulauf led the charge to apply for financial assistance through Andrew Carnegie, which they received. The city council of Jeffersonville donated Warder Park as the site for the new library and Arthur Loomis was chosen as the architect. Loomis' plans for a building in the Beaux Arts style were approved in July 1903, with construction beginning shortly thereafter. The cornerstone was laid on September 19, 1903, and the Carnegie Library was completed in December 1904 and officially opened to the public in February 1905.

This Library served the community until its current location on the corner of Court Avenue and Locust Street was built and opened to the public in 1970. Continuing need for expansion led to a major renovation project in 2004, when second floor of the building was added. During this time the entire library collection moved to a temporary location in the Census Bureau building on Plank Road in Jeffersonville. The project was meant to take 18 months but ended up taking nearly 3 years and the library collection was moved back into the renovated building in January 2007. The library reopened on January 23, 2007, and continues to serve the Jeffersonville township community.

=== Clarksville Branch ===
There were many attempts to provide library service in Clarksville since the library opened. In 1955 a branch opened at 304 West Stansifer Avenue, moving to 523 Eastern Boulevard in 1958. This branch was closed in 1964 and replaced with Bookmobile service which ceased in 1979. In 1988 the "Green Tree Branch" opened in an annex building of the Green Tree Mall, and the support was such that a dedicated branch library building was built in 1992 at 1312 Eastern Boulevard at the corner of Eastern Boulevard and Triangle Drive. This branch opened to the public on May 2, 1993.

== Main Library Organization ==
=== Basement ===
The majority of the basement is now available only to staff and houses the Technical Processing department. However, there is a small conference room available to the public through the library's online meeting room reservation system. The Friends of the Jeffersonville Township Public Library also operate a book sale room located in the basement, which is open from 10 am - 1 pm on the 2nd and 4th Fridays and Saturdays of each month.

=== First Floor ===
All of the adult library materials are located on the first floor, including multimedia, fiction books, and nonfiction books, reference materials, magazines, newspapers, and audiobooks. Both nonfiction books and reference works are shelved according to the Dewey Decimal System. There are two public computer labs, one located at the north end of the building by the Circulation department and the other at the south end of the building by the Reference department. The Indiana Room is also located at the south end of the first floor and contains a non-circulating collection of local history and genealogy materials.

=== Second Floor ===
The majority of the second floor contains the Youth Services department, which houses all children's books, young adult novels, young adult talking books, children's movies, and children and teen magazines. There is also a computer lab available to patrons under age 18. The rest of the second floor contains library administration offices, the board room, and several outdoor garden terrace areas open to the public.

== See also ==
- Untitled, an artwork by Barney Bright located at the library.
