= Untitled (Jeffersonville) =

1970 sculpture by Barney Bright

- Artist: Barney Bright
- Year: 1970
- Type: Bronze & Copper tubing
- Dimensions: 320 cm × 150 cm × 180 cm (126 in × 60 in × 70 in)
- Location: Jeffersonville, Indiana; 38°16′32.59″N 85°44′26.27″W
- Owner: Jeffersonville Township Public Library

Untitled is a public artwork by American artist Barney Bright, located at the Jeffersonville Township Public Library in Jeffersonville, Indiana, United States. Untitled was originally surveyed as part of the Smithsonian's Save Outdoor Sculpture! survey in 1993. This abstract sculpture represents the Devonian time period.

== Description ==
The sculpture, which looks like a sea creature, comprises numerous tentacles of varying lengths that stream up and out from a main stem. The stem is mounted on a rectangular base made of Indiana limestone (approx. 83 x 20 x 20 in.) and weighs 400 lbs.

A plaque sits nearby mounted on a piece of driftwood stating:

THE SCULPTURE DISPLAYED ON THE EAST COLONADE REPRESENTS
ITS CREATOR'S IMPRESSIONS OF THE DEVONIAN TIME PERIOD WHEN
THE FALLS OF THE OHIO FOSSIL BEDS WERE BEING FORMED.
THOUGH THE GRACEFULLY OUTSTRETCHING TENTACLES HAVE A
CRUSTY FOSSILIFEROUS LOOK, THE SCULPTOR, BARNEY BRIGHT, DESCRIBES
THE GENTLY FLOWING LINES OF HIS SCULPTURE AS EXPRESSING THE
FIRST MOVEMENT OF LIFE REACHING OUT FROM THE SEA TO THE EARTH.
THE WORK IS COMPOSED OF COPPER TUBING WELDED OVER WITH
400 POUNDS OF BRONZE. THE BENCH-BASE ON WHICH THE
SCULPTURE RESTS IS MADE OF INDIANA LIMESTONE.

== Information ==
The board of the Jefferson Township Library commissioned Barney Bright to make the sculpture for their new library. The sculpture, which cost $7,500, was originally located on a limestone bench fifteen feet from its current location. Between 1977 and early 1978 it was moved and installed on a higher base to help prevent vandalism. The museum was renovated in 2007 and the sculpture was moved inside and placed within one of the many fountains (representing the Falls) that were built.

Bright describes the sculpture as representing the Devonian time period, which is the era when the Falls of the Ohio were being formed. According to the SOS! survey the sculpture " the tentacled sculpture represents life reaching out for the sea and covering the earth." Local controversy ensued due to the scientific nature of the sculpture upon its installation. In 2007, the News and Tribune described the sculpture fountain as contributing to a "relaxing atmosphere" at the library.
