= Arthur Loomis =

American architect (1859–1935)

- Born: January 28, 1859; Westfield, Massachusetts, U.S.
- Died: January 8, 1935 (aged 75); Louisville, Kentucky, U.S.
- Resting place: Cave Hill Cemetery; Louisville, Kentucky, U.S.
- Occupation: Architect
- Spouse: Carrie Dorsey (m. 1902)

Arthur Loomis (January 28, 1859 – January 8, 1935) was an architect who worked from 1876 through the 1920s in the Louisville, Kentucky area. After working for noted architect Charles J. Clarke for several years, they became partners in 1891, creating Clarke & Loomis, one of Louisville's most prestigious architectural firms. After Clarke's death in 1908, Loomis struck out on his own.

== Early and family life ==
Arthur Loomis was born January 28, 1859, in Westfield, Massachusetts, to Dr. John Loomis and Clarissa Loomis née Robinson. Just before the Civil War, the family moved to Jeffersonville, Indiana. Loomis married Carrie Dorsey of Jeffersonville on December 9, 1902, and they moved to Louisville. They had no children. He died on January 8, 1935, at the Kentucky Baptist Hospital of a heart attack, and was buried in Cave Hill Cemetery.

== Career ==
Loomis was a Mason and member of the Shrine. In addition to his position with Clarke & Loomis, he was an associate architect with the Southern Baptist Theological Seminary. He is considered the first president of the Kentucky Chapter of the American Institute of Architects. Although his former partner Charles Clarke was elected, he died before taking office, and Loomis fulfilled his term.

== Designs ==
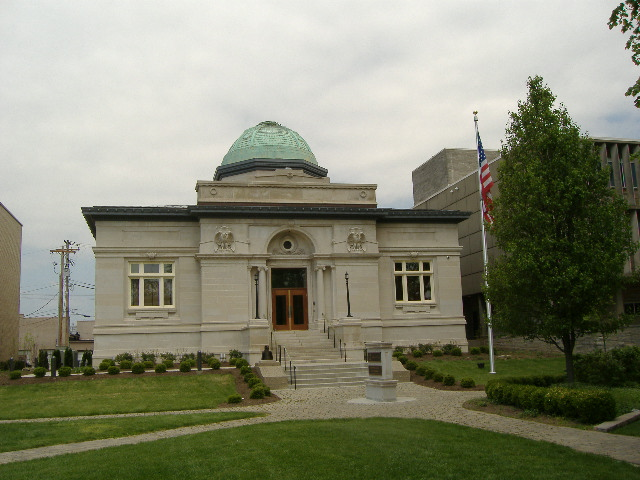
Carnegie Library in Jeffersonville, Indiana

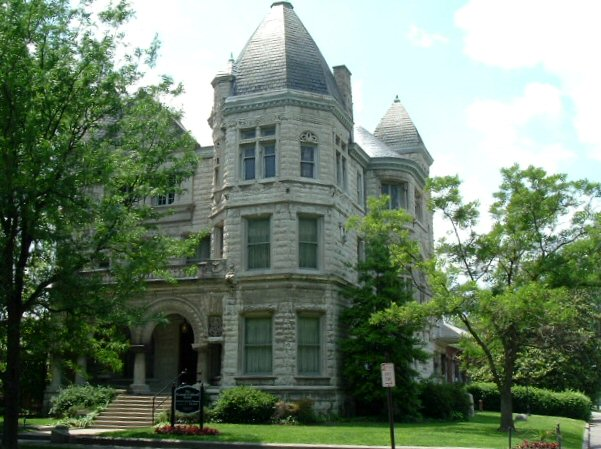
Conrad-Caldwell House, Louisville

Loomis designed the Carnegie Library in Warder Park, Jeffersonville, Indiana. He also designed the Conrad-Caldwell House, a contributing property in the St. James–Belgravia Historic District in Old Louisville.

A number of buildings that Loomis or the firm designed survive and are listed on the National Register of Historic Places. They include:

- The Beaux-Arts Fireproof Storage Company Warehouse in Louisville
- Speed Building, 319 Guthrie Green, Louisville
- Carrie Gaulbert Cox and Attilla Cox, Jr., House, 389 Mockingbird Valley Rd., Louisville (Clarke and Loomis)
- Henry Frank House, Madison Ave., Middletown, KY
- Jewish Hospital Complex, 236 E. Kennedy St., Louisville
- Jones Estate, 1905 Stonegate Rd., Anchorage, KY
- Levy Brothers Building, 235 W. Market St., Louisville (Clarke & Loomis)
- One or more buildings in Old Jeffersonville Historic District, roughly bounded by Court Ave., Graham St., Ohio River, & I-65, Jeffersonville, Indiana
- Shelby Park Branch Library, 600 E. Oak St., Louisville (Loomis & Hartman)
- St. Luke's Church, 1204 Maple Lane, Anchorage, KY
- St. Paul's German Evangelical Church and Parish House, 213 E. Broadway, Louisville (Clarke & Loomis)
- St. Peter's German Evangelical Church, 1231 W. Jefferson St., Louisville (Clarke & Loomis)
- University of Louisville School of Medicine, 101 W. Chestnut St., Louisville (Clarke & Loomis)
- Whiteside Bakery, 1400 W. Broadway St., Louisville
- Dr. Winston's House, 11906 Ridge Rd., Anchorage, KY (Clarke & Loomis)
