= Floral clock (Frankfort, Kentucky) =

Landmark in Frankfort, Kentucky, United States

Coordinates: 38°11′9.60″N 84°52′34.98″W

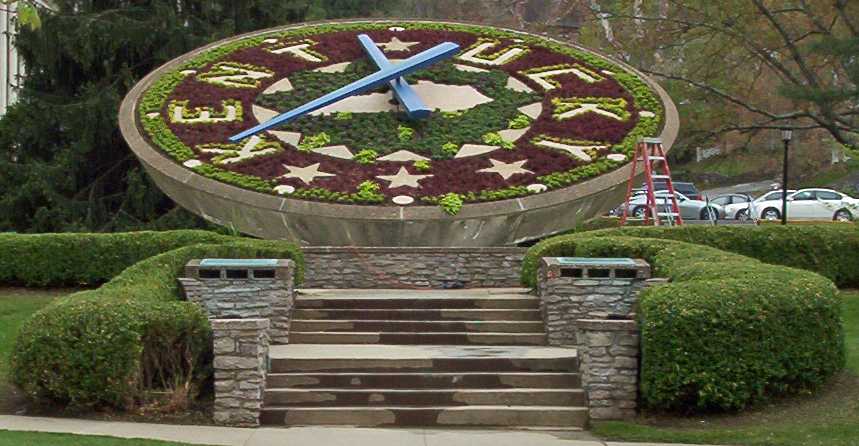
The floral clock in Frankfort

The floral clock in Frankfort, Kentucky, is a landmark located behind the Kentucky State Capitol. Dedicated in May 1961 by Governor Bert T. Combs, the clock was constructed as a joint project between the state government and the Garden Club of Kentucky.

== History ==
On April 10, 1961, Combs appropriated US$50,000 from the governor's contingency fund to construct the clock on the lawn of the state capitol. Combs had seen a similar clock in Edinburgh, Scotland, and believed it would be a colorful addition to the capitol grounds. When construction was completed on the clock, some ridiculed it as "Combs' Folly" or "Big Bert" (an allusion to London's Big Ben). Combs' political foe, A. B. "Happy" Chandler, was particularly critical, declaring "It's amazing what some people will think of when they have nothing better to do." In a subsequent gubernatorial campaign, Chandler mocked the clock, declaring "Well, they don't say it's half past 2 in Frankfort anymore. They say it's two petunias past the jimson weed." Chandler's derision became the minority view in time, however; according to journalist John Ed Pearce, the clock became one of the most talked-about and visited tourist attractions in the state and the most visited place in Frankfort.

== Construction ==
The face of the clock measures 34 feet (10 m) in diameter and is tilted at a 26-degree angle. The word "Kentucky" is spelled out in large letters around the top of the clock. The minute hand is 20 feet (6.1 m) long, and the hour hand is 15 feet (4.6 m) long; both weigh approximately 500 pounds (230 kg). The clock face is composed of more than 10,000 flowers, and the planter that holds them weighs 100 short tons (91 t). The majority of the flowers consist of Joseph's coat and begonias. All of the flowers used in the clock face are grown in greenhouses near the capitol and owned by the state.

Instead of sitting on a bank of earth as most similar floral clocks do, the Frankfort clock is suspended above a pool of water. The pool is 36 feet (11 m) in diameter and 4.5 feet (1.4 m) deep. Visitors often use the pool as a wishing well. Until the early 1970s, coins thrown into the pool were used by Kentucky's child care agencies to purchase recreation and gym equipment and to fund Garden Club scholarships to the University of Kentucky for students studying horticulture or land design; now the money is used solely for scholarships. The coins are collected from the pool every three weeks. In the first three years following the clock's dedication, $6,000 in coins was collected from the pool.

A mechanism housed in the stone pedestal that supports the clock moves its hands. The mechanism is composed of six gears and an electrical meter [sic]. Every sixty seconds, the minute hand moves 1.5 feet (0.46 m), and the hour hand moves proportionately. Every hour, an additional control mechanism makes any necessary corrections to the displayed time and is capable of resetting the clock in the event of a power failure.

== Recognition ==
In May 1962, the National Council of State Garden Clubs presented the state of Kentucky with its Bronze Seal Award for its efforts to beautify the state capitol, with the clock being a large part of that effort. In 2002, the capitol grounds, including the floral clock, were featured on the HGTV series "Great American Gardens".

== See also ==
- Louisville Clock

== Bibliography ==
- Brammer, Jack (1988-06-22). "Keeping Time But Losing Money: Floral Clock Getting Shortchanged". Lexington Herald-Leader. p. B1.
- "Combs Rose to Pinnacle From Plain Beginnings". Lexington Herald-Leader. Knight-Ridder News Service. 1991-12-05. p. A1.
- Hightower, Kyle (2001-06-30). "State Capitol Gets HGTV's Vote for Show Governing Inside, Gardening Outside". Lexington Herald-Leader. p. 15.
- "Kentucky's Floral Clock A Winner!". The Sebree Banner. 1964-08-06. p. 7.
- Lovelace, Marty (1963-09-13). "Touring Scenic Kentucky". The Sebree Banner. p. 2.
- Pearce, John Ed (1987). Divide and Dissent: Kentucky Politics 1930–1963. Lexington, Kentucky: The University Press of Kentucky. ISBN 0-8131-1613-9.
- Ramsey, Sy (1962-08-20). "On Capitol Grounds: Kentucky Floral Clock Draws Visitors, Puns". The Free-Lance Star. p. 10.
