= St. Peter's German Evangelical Church =

Historic church in Kentucky, United States

- U.S. National Register of Historic Places
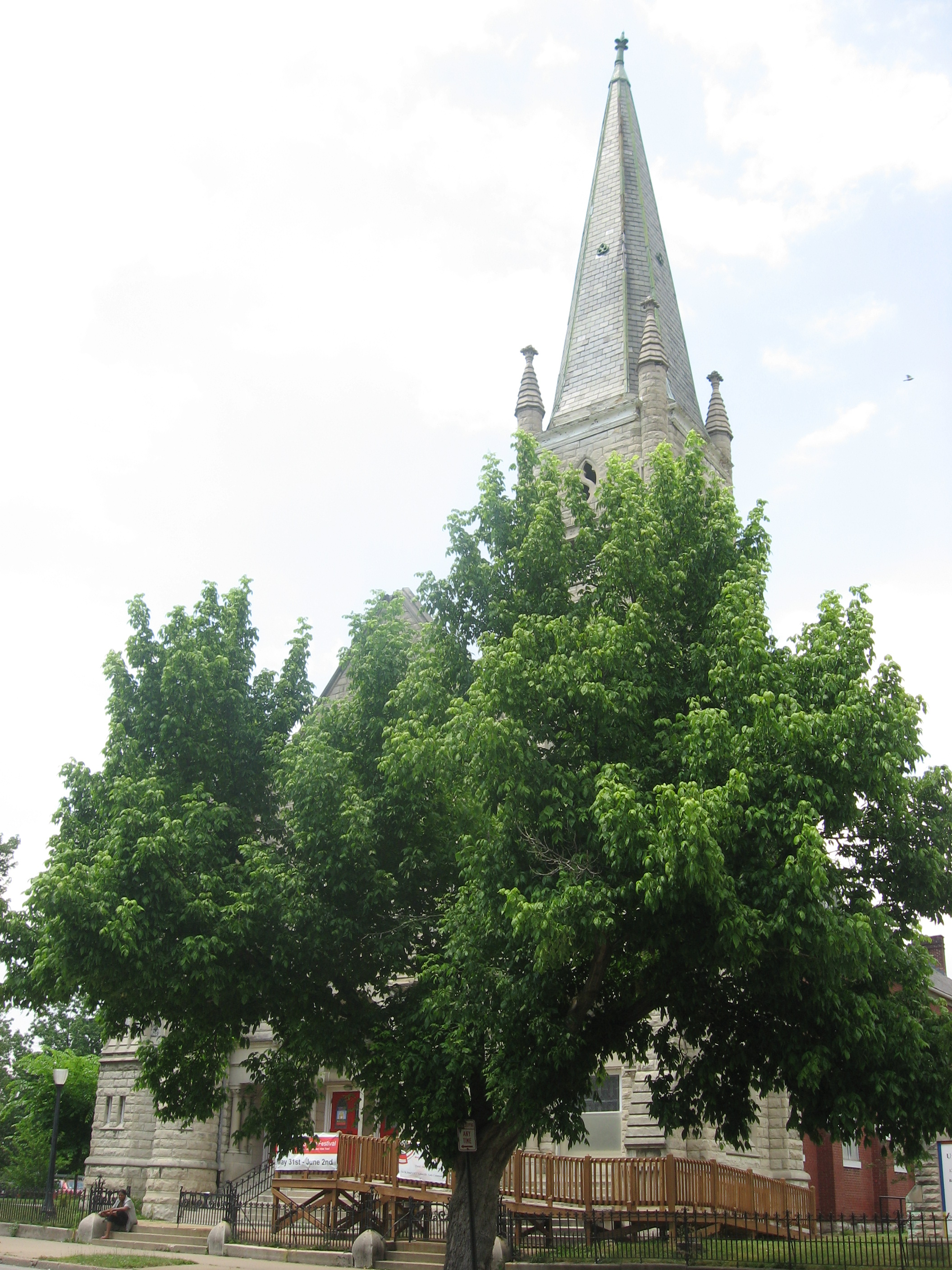
- Front, partially obscured by trees

- Location within Kentucky Location within the United States
- Location: 1231 W. Jefferson St., Louisville, Kentucky
- Coordinates: 38°15′21″N 85°46′16″W
- Area: less than one acre
- Built: 1894
- Architect: Clarke & Loomis
- Architectural style: Late Gothic Revival
- NRHP reference No.: 80001621
- Added to NRHP: December 4, 1980

St. Peter's German Evangelical Church is a historic church at 1231 W. Jefferson Street in Louisville, Kentucky. It was built in 1894 in Late Gothic Revival style and added to the National Register of Historic Places in 1980.

It was deemed notable as "an excellent example of the late Gothic Revival style in ecclesiastical architecture in Louisville. The building is one of the most beautifully detailed works of the prominent Louisville architectural firm of Clarke & Loomis."

The church was organized in 1847 to serve the large German population in the western part of Louisville, and English was not used in the church until 1893. The current building was built during 1894–1895.
