= Schimpff's Confectionery =

American confectionery company

Coordinates: 38.272718°N 85.741253°W

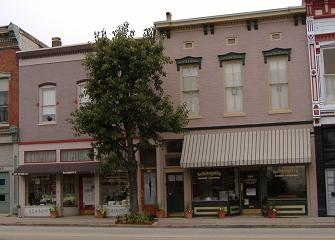
Schimpff's Confectionery exterior

Schimpff's Confectionery is a historic candy maker, confectionery store, and museum located in Jeffersonville, Indiana, within the Old Jeffersonville Historic District.

== History ==
The Schimpff family had been making candy in the Louisville, Kentucky area since the 1850s.

The current premises were opened on April 11, 1891, by Gustav Schimpff Sr. and Jr. and the family lived above the store.

In 1937 the first and second levels of the business were flooded.

From 1990 to 2026, the company was owned by fourth generation family members Jill and Warren Schimpff. In 2026, they passed the ownership to fifth generation family members Steve and Beth Shepherd.

Since 2000 the store has had two expansions to make room for a candy museum and a demonstration area for visitors to watch the candy being made.

== Recognition ==
It was featured on the History Channel's Modern Marvels in 2006, by the Historic Landmarks Foundation of Indiana in 2004, and by ABC 20/20 on a television special entitled "Disney Celebrates America: The Pursuit of Happiness" in 2026. It is also noted as one of Indiana's seven "Hidden Treasures".

== See also ==
- List of attractions and events in the Louisville metropolitan area
