= Louisville Clock =

Artwork by Barney Bright

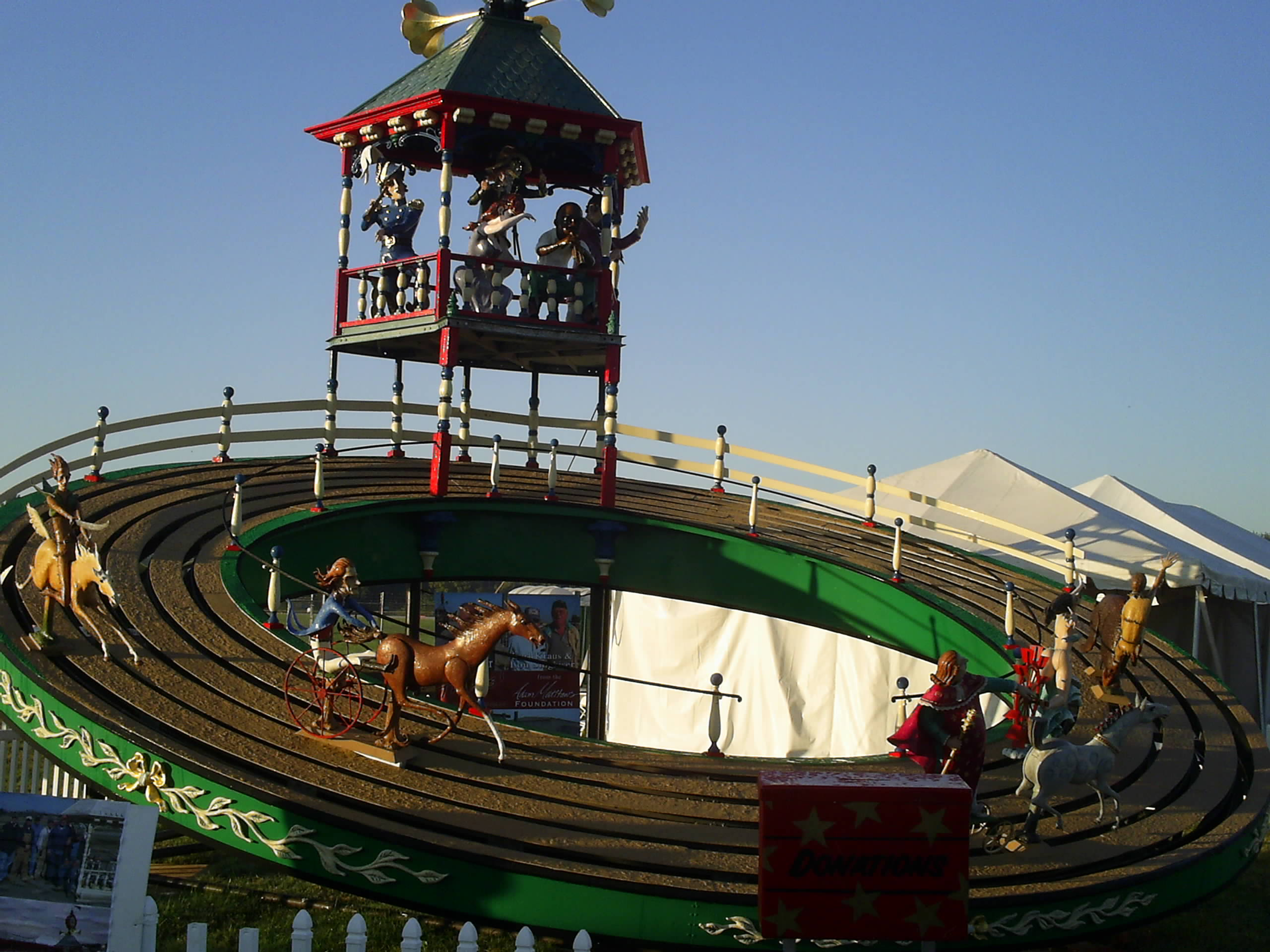
- Louisville Clock
- Architect: Barney Bright
- Dedicated: December 3, 1976
- Dedicated by: Wilson W. Wyatt
- Dedicated at: River City Mall (later the Louisville Galleria and then Fourth Street Live!)
- Location: Theatre Square

The Louisville Clock (often called the Derby Clock) was a 40-foot (12 m) high ornamental clock that was formerly located on Fourth Street in Louisville, Kentucky. It was designed in the appearance like a gigantic wind-up toy, incorporating themes of Kentucky culture, especially the Kentucky Derby horse race. Eight ornamental columns supported an elevated 5-lane race track.

At noon each day, a bugle would announce the beginning of a race between five hand-carved statues of figures with local significance: George Rogers Clark, Daniel Boone, Thomas Jefferson, King Louis XVI of France, and the Belle of Louisville. Several mechanized sculptures of notable past Louisvillians watched from above in a Victorian-esque gazebo: Mary Anderson, D.W. Griffith, Zachary Taylor, Henry Watterson, and the trumpeter Oliver Cooke. In 2015, it was dismantled and moved into indefinite storage.

== History ==
In 1970, Barney Bright was commissioned to create a major landmark for the city to be located in the new River City Mall development (later the Louisville Galleria, and then Fourth Street Live!). Funds were not allocated initially and River City Mall opened with the space intended for the clock sitting empty.

In 1974, former mayor Wilson W. Wyatt found funding and formed a committee that selected Barney Bright of Louisville to design the clock. Construction began immediately and the clock was dedicated on December 3, 1976, before a crowd of 3,000 people. However the final result was scaled back considerably due to cost.

The clock suffered from mechanical problems and was frequently out of order. The city ended up paying over $20,000 a year in maintenance costs. When the Louisville Galleria opened in 1981, the clock had to be moved a block south to Guthrie Street. Later in 1986 the clock was relocated to the Kentucky Fair and Exposition Center, but the city stopped making repairs and it sat inactive for years before being removed in 1993. Its new location the Kentucky Derby Museum and there it would remain in pieces in storage for several years.

The clock was relocated to Bowman Field after undertaking a restoration project. Barney Bright's son Jeb Bright had been restoring the figures for the project. In December 2009, the clock's chief restorer Adam Burckle came to an agreement with Louisville Metro mayor Jerry Abramson to install the clock in a new landscaped plaza at the entrance of the Louisville Zoo in Spring 2010, where it would be viewed by about 900,000 zoo visitors a year. In December 2010, zoo officials decided the cost, to be as much as $200,000 or more, to create a centerpiece and a stand for the clock was too much, and was therefore unaffordable.

On October 6, 2011, it was announced that the Louisville Clock would return to downtown Louisville after decades away. The 45-foot (14 m) clock, which features colorful characters racing on its face, was located at Theatre Square, near the Brown Hotel.

On August 24, 2012, after functioning in its new location for about 2 months, the clock was fine tuned, and dedicated to the city. Adam Burkle and his Adam Matthews Foundation supported most of the restoration, with costs near $1.1 million since the beginning of the restoration effort, which started about eight years prior to the dedication of the clock.

In June 2015, the clock was dismantled and put into storage because the land it was on was sold by the city of Louisville. According to The Courier Journal, "The clock moved around the end of June from its Theater Square location on Fourth Street, where it had sat since August 2012, and been inoperative for nearly the year prior.

The clock was moved to make way for the $36 million headquarters expansion project of Kindred Healthcare, which had bought up most of the land at Theater Square – on Fourth just north of Broadway across from the Brown Hotel – around the government-owned plaza where the clock rests."

The clock has been stored out of public view indefinitely, pending the identification of a new place to exhibit it.

== See also ==
- Floral clock (Frankfort, Kentucky)
- List of attractions and events in the Louisville metropolitan area
