= Grisamore House =

Historic house in Indiana, United States

- U.S. National Register of Historic Places
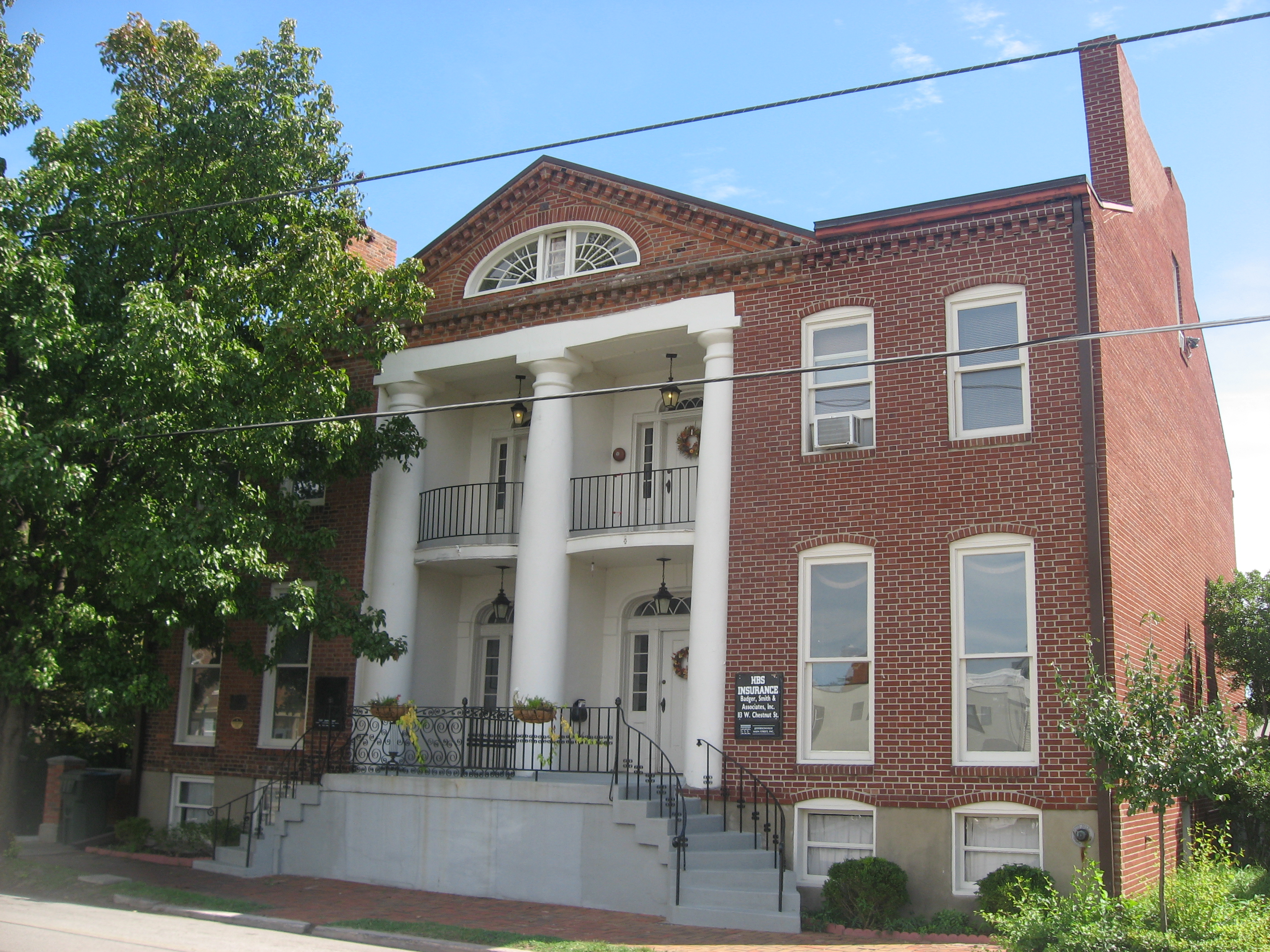

- Location within Clark County, Indiana Location within Indiana Location within the United States
- Location: 111-113 W. Chestnut St., Jeffersonville, Indiana
- Coordinates: 38°16′17″N 85°44′26″W
- Area: less than one acre
- Built: 1837
- Architectural style: Greek Revival, Federal
- NRHP reference No.: 83000119
- Added to NRHP: May 9, 1983

The Grisamore House is a historic home located in downtown Jeffersonville, Indiana. It was built by two brothers from Philadelphia, David and Wilson Grisamore, in 1837. It is a 2 1/2-story, Federal style brick double house with Greek Revival style design elements. The front facade features three stucco-coated, two-story Doric order columns in antis and two projecting second story balconies. It has housed several important Jeffersonville families. For example, future president William Henry Harrison gave a speech on the front porch in 1840 while campaigning to become president.

In the 1930s, it was the Decker Art Studio.

It suffered fire damage in 1981, but was saved from destruction by the Jeff-Clark Preservation, Inc. In 1983, it was added to National Register of Historic Places. It is now part of the Old Jeffersonville Historic District, and houses private businesses. The Historic Landmarks Foundation of Indiana formerly had its Southern Indiana regional office here before they relocated the Willey House next to the Grisamore House.
