= Warder Park =

Park located in Jeffersonville, Indiana, U.S.

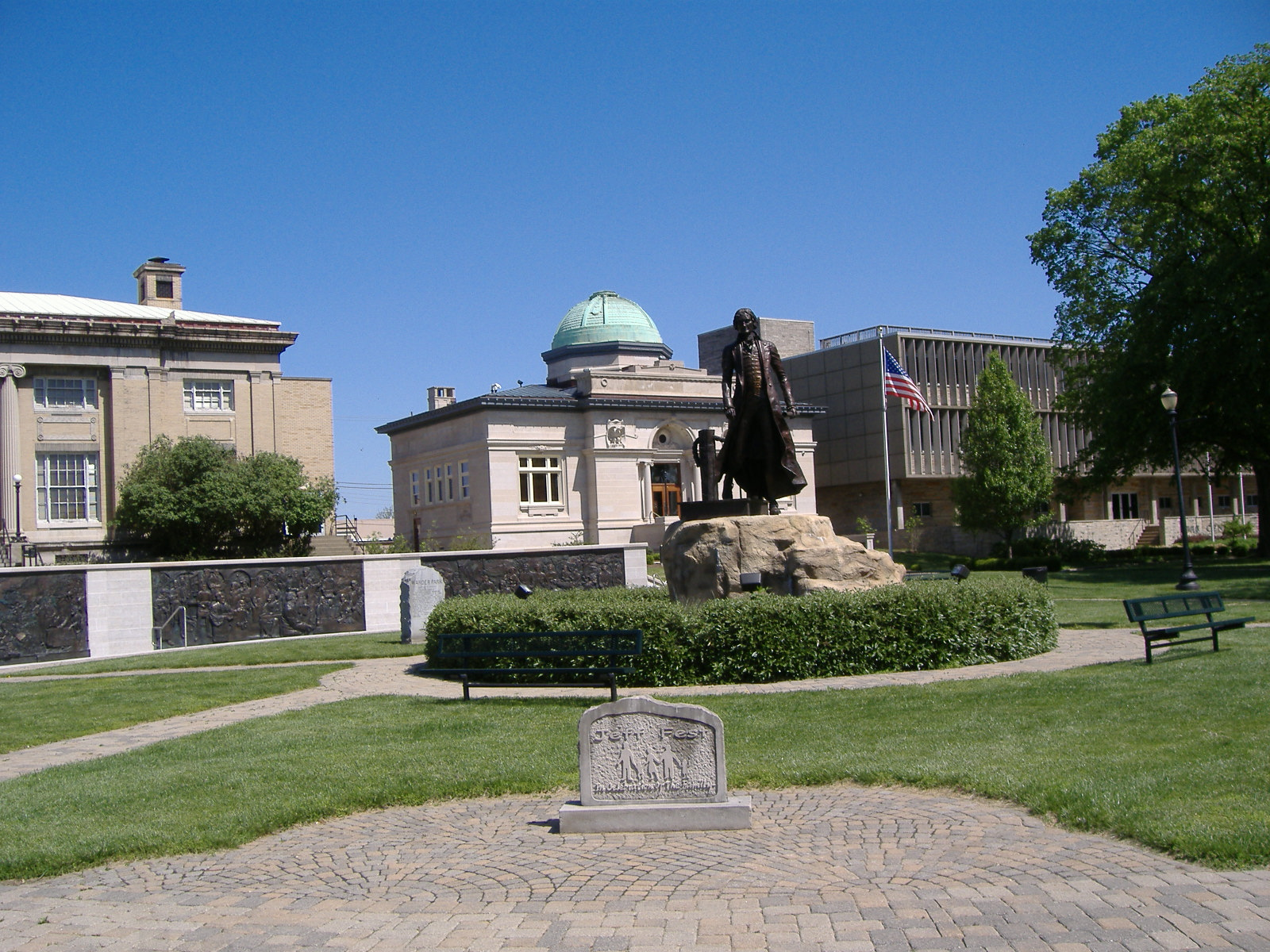
- Warder Park's Thomas Jefferson Statue.
- Interactive map of Warder Park
- Type: Municipal
- Location: Jeffersonville, Indiana
- Coordinates: 38.275032°N 85.742161°W
- Created: 1881
- Operator: Jeff Parks Department
- Status: Open all year

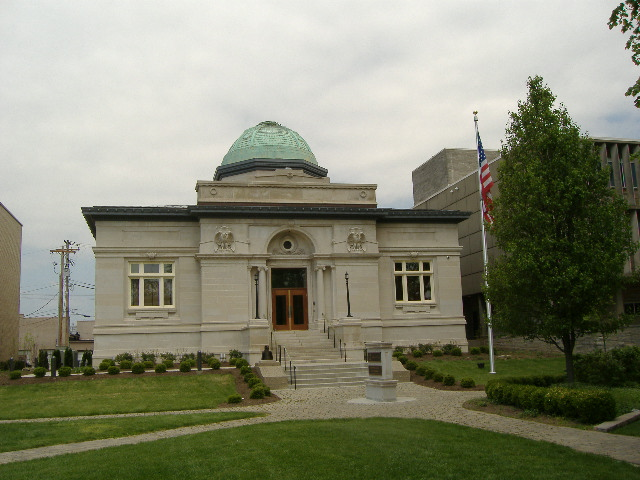
Carnegie Library

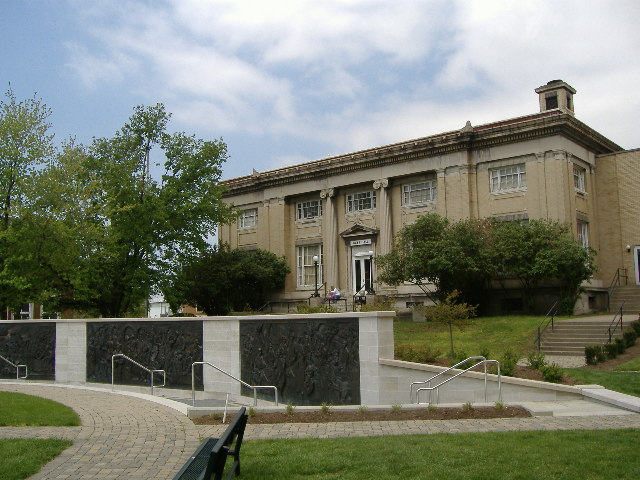
The old Jeffersonville post office, located in the park

Warder Park is located in Jeffersonville, Indiana on Court Avenue. This park has been a part of the community since the mid-19th century, when it had a bakery to produce hardtack to Union soldiers during the American Civil War. The park wasn't established officially until the year 1881 and is named after then Mayor Luther Warder. Warder had wanted the site for a new city hall, but the city council chose a site between Spring and Pearl on the north side of Market Street for the city hall, and named the park after Warder as a gesture of goodwill. A Carnegie Library was built in 1903.

== Carnegie library ==
The Carnegie Library was one of the early Carnegie libraries funded in Indiana by Andrew Carnegie, to the tune of $15,000. The Neo-Classical architecture was done by Arthur Loomis, a nationally respected architect in the firm of Clarke & Loomis Architecture, with the cornerstone being set on September 19, 1903. Loomis was a native of Jeffersonville. The building once held classes for Indiana University Southeast. The Carnegie Library is the central focus point in Warder Park and now contains the Remnant Trust of Rare Books and Documents.

The building will eventually hold an extensive collection of titles, including:

- A 19th-century edition of Life and Times of Frederick Douglass
- A 560-year-old page of a Gutenberg Bible
- A 1350 copy of the Magna Carta
- A copy of the first British Edition of Lewis and Clark's Travels to the Source of the Missouri River.

The Carnegie Library opened October 25, 2006 after a 4 million dollar renovation for the Remnant Trust and also included a bas-relief sculpture, titled The Timeline of Liberty, by sculptor Lorenzo Ghiglieri. The 6-ton, three panel (7 feet tall and 20 feet wide), bronze sculpture traces 2,500 years of human liberty from ancient Greece to modernity.

== Thomas Jefferson statue ==
In 2002/2003 the park was cleared and renovations started. This included a ten-foot-tall cast bronze figure of Thomas Jefferson by sculptor Guy Tedesco. The 900-pound statue was commissioned for the Jeffersonville town bicentennial and for the "Falls of the Ohio" signature event to mark the Lewis and Clark Bicentennial.

== Summer concerts ==
The gazebo located in the middle of the parks field holds concerts during the summer. The local newspaper The Evening News usually posts the dates and times of the shows.

== See also ==
- Old Jeffersonville Historic District
