= Floral clock =

Decorative chronometer made of flowers

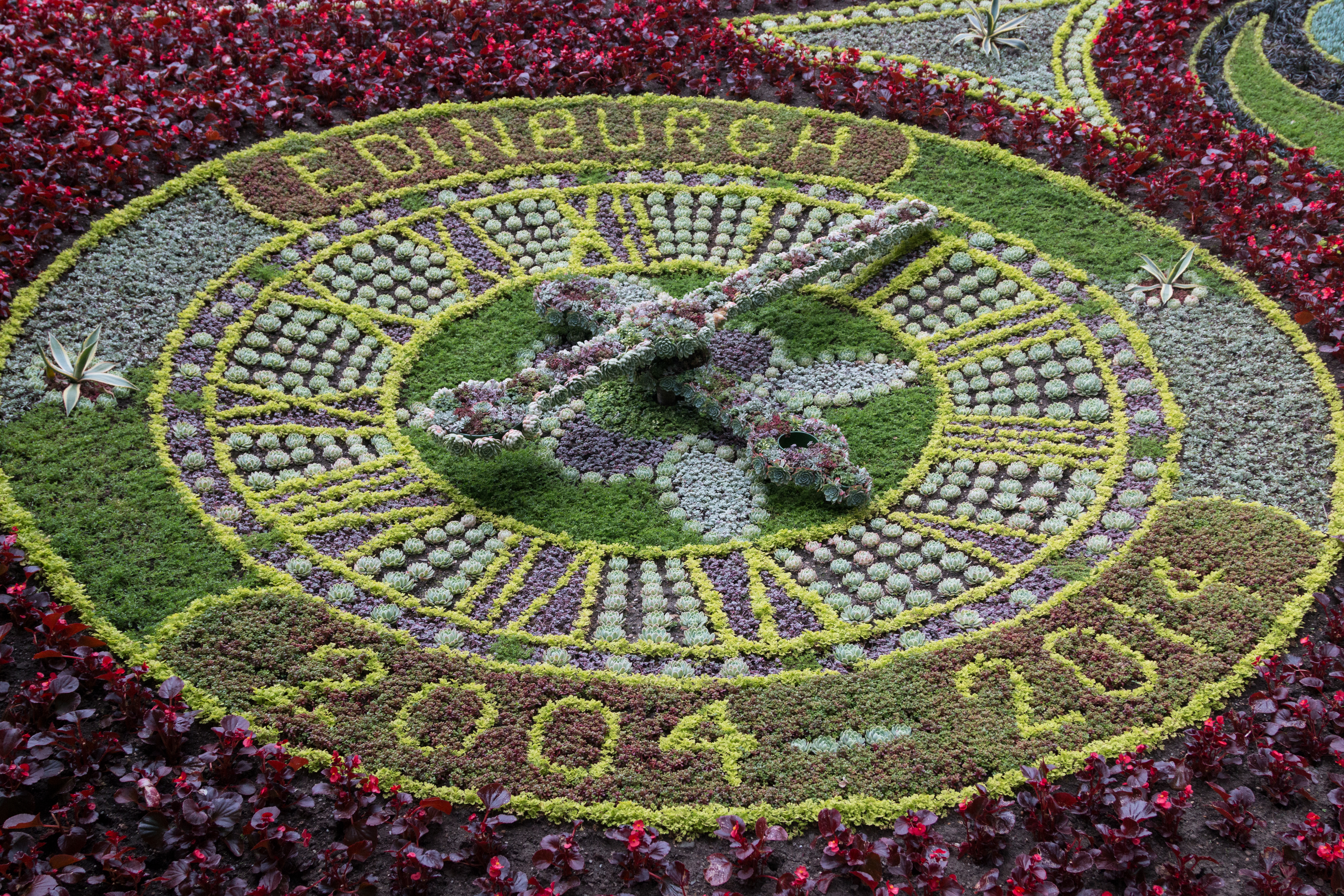
The Edinburgh Floral Clock

A floral clock, or flower clock, is a large decorative clock with the clock face formed by carpet bedding, usually found in a park or other public recreation area. Most have the mechanism set in the ground under the flowerbed, which is then planted to visually appear as a clock face with moving hands which may also hold bedding plants.

The first floral clock was the idea of John McHattie, Superintendent of Parks in Edinburgh, Scotland. It was first planted up in the spring of 1903 in West Princes Street Gardens. In that year it had only an hour hand but a minute hand was added the following year. A cuckoo which pops out every quarter hour was added in 1952. The clock was soon imitated across the United Kingdom and later throughout the world.

In Edinburgh, the clock mechanism is set inside the plinth of the statue to Allan Ramsay adjacent. The first mechanism using salvaged parts from Elie Parish Church in Fife was installed by James Ritchie & Son. A new mechanism was installed in 1934 and has been electrically operated since 1973. It is still maintained by James Ritchie Clockmakers.

The only flower clock with two faces moved by the same system is located in Zacatlán, Puebla, Mexico. It has two faces, each five metres (16 ft) in diameter. It was built by Relojes Centenario, a local manufacturer.

== Examples ==
Michael Jackson had a floral clock at his Neverland Ranch.

Other floral clocks can be seen in the International Peace Garden on the border between North Dakota and Manitoba, Rockford, Illinois and in Frankfort, Kentucky.

On 19 May 2016, Camarillo Plaza in California unveiled a 13-foot (4.0 m) in diameter floral clock. The clock was created as a dedication to Mr. David Pick.

== Images ==
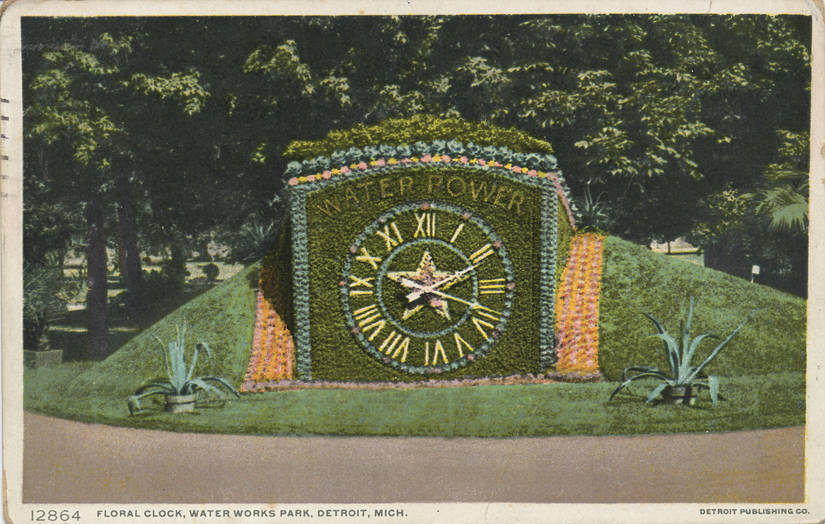
Floral clock in Water Works Park in Detroit, circa 1900s

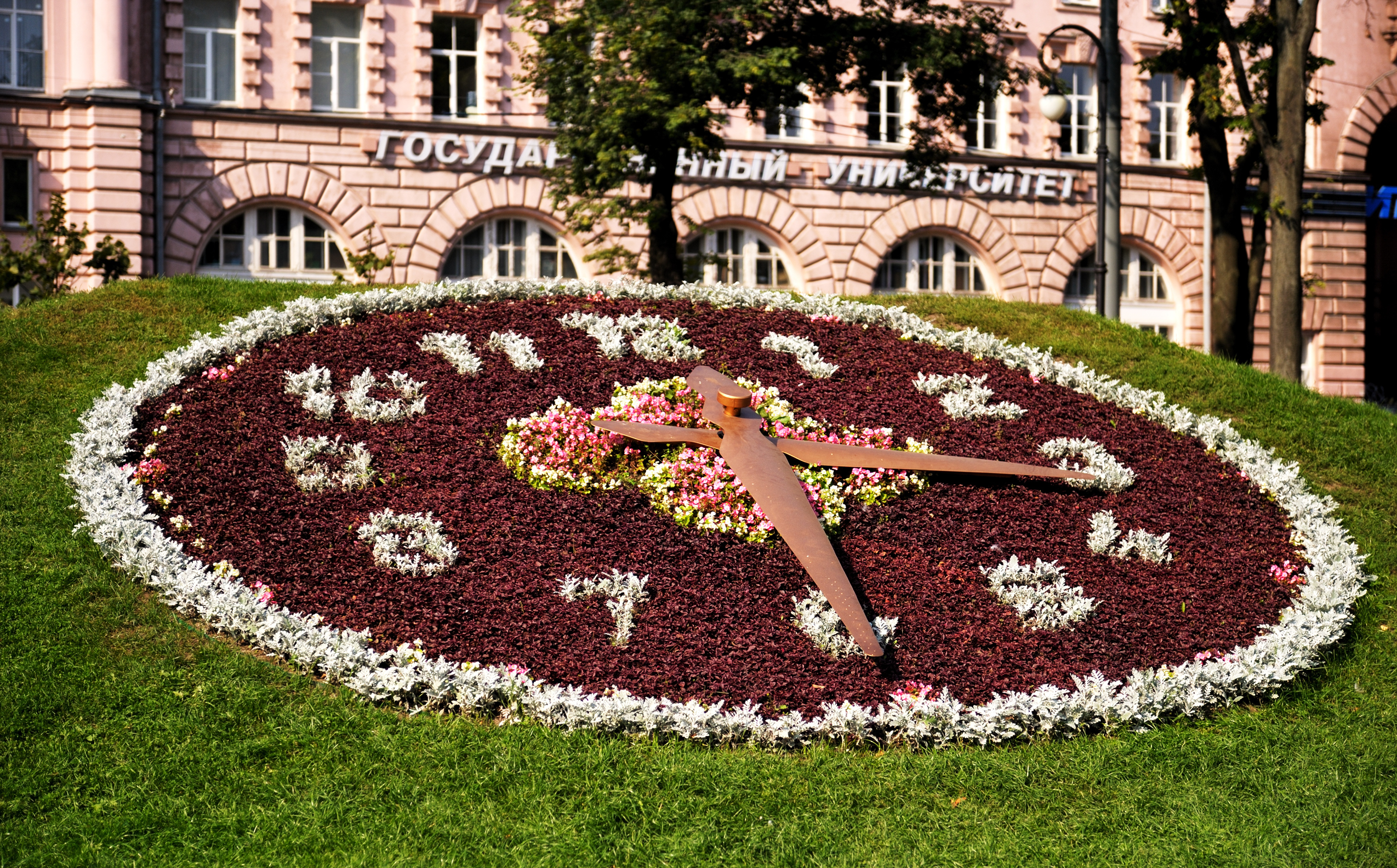
Saint Petersburg, Russia

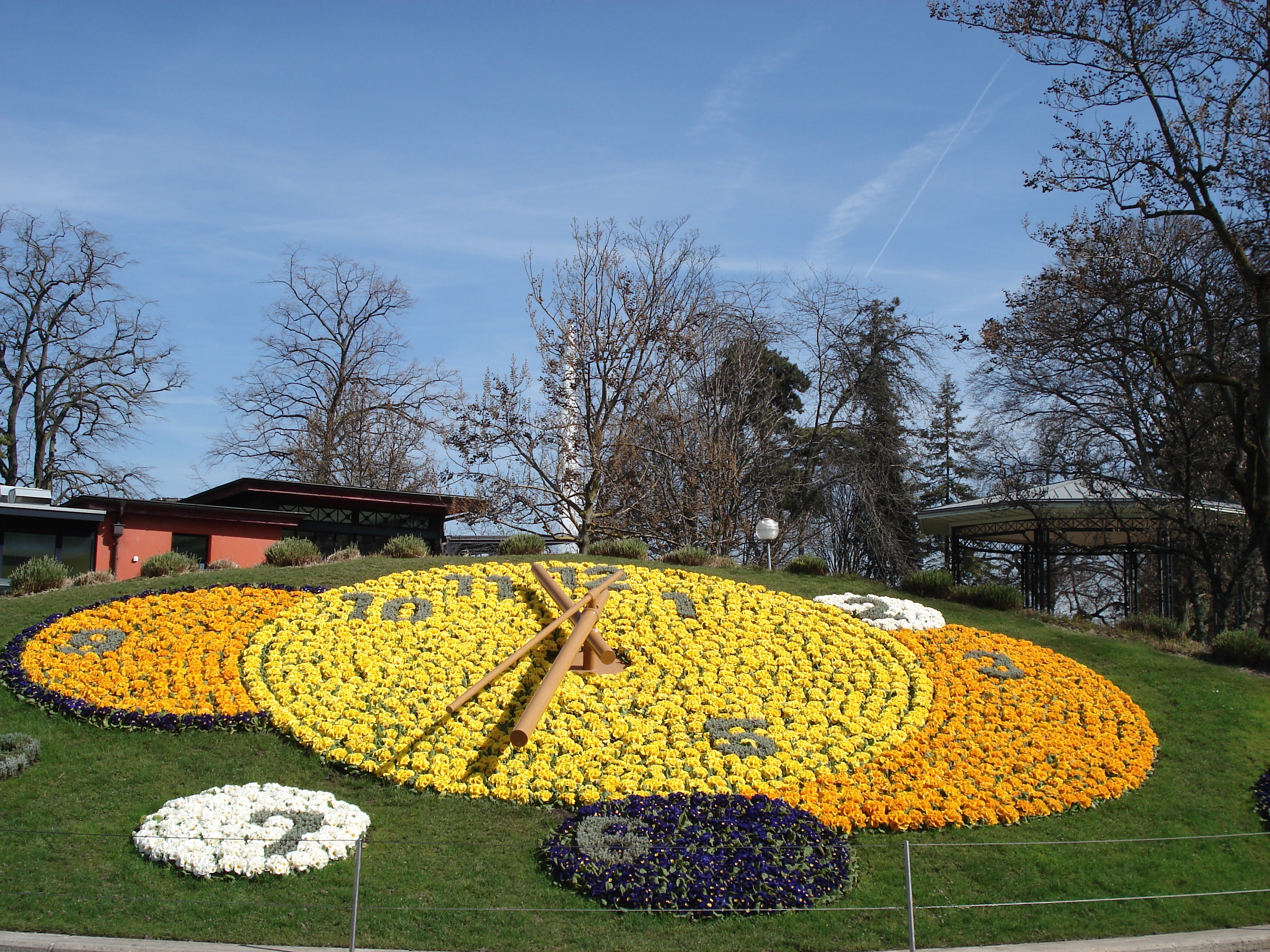
Geneva, Switzerland

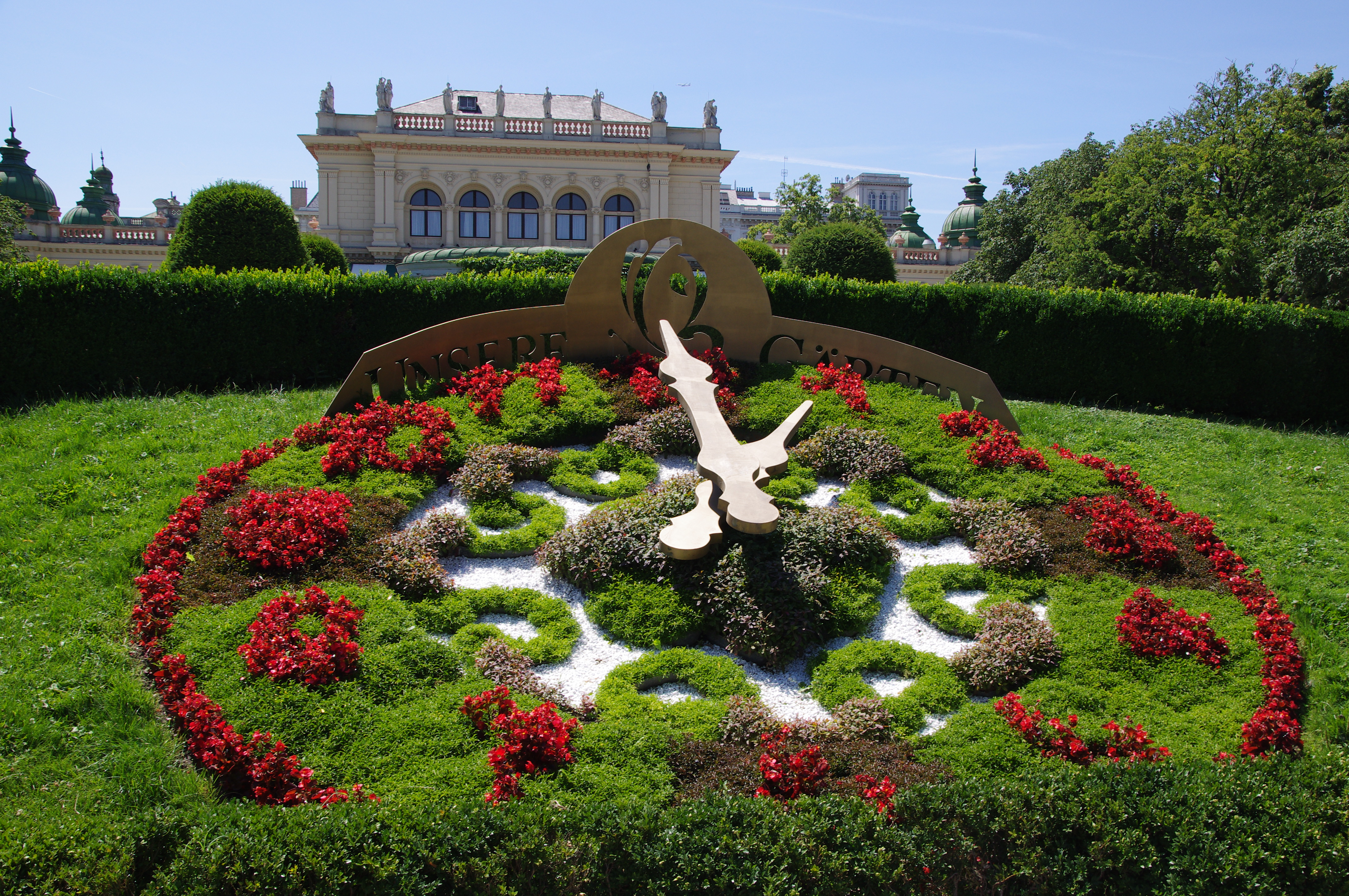
Vienna, Austria

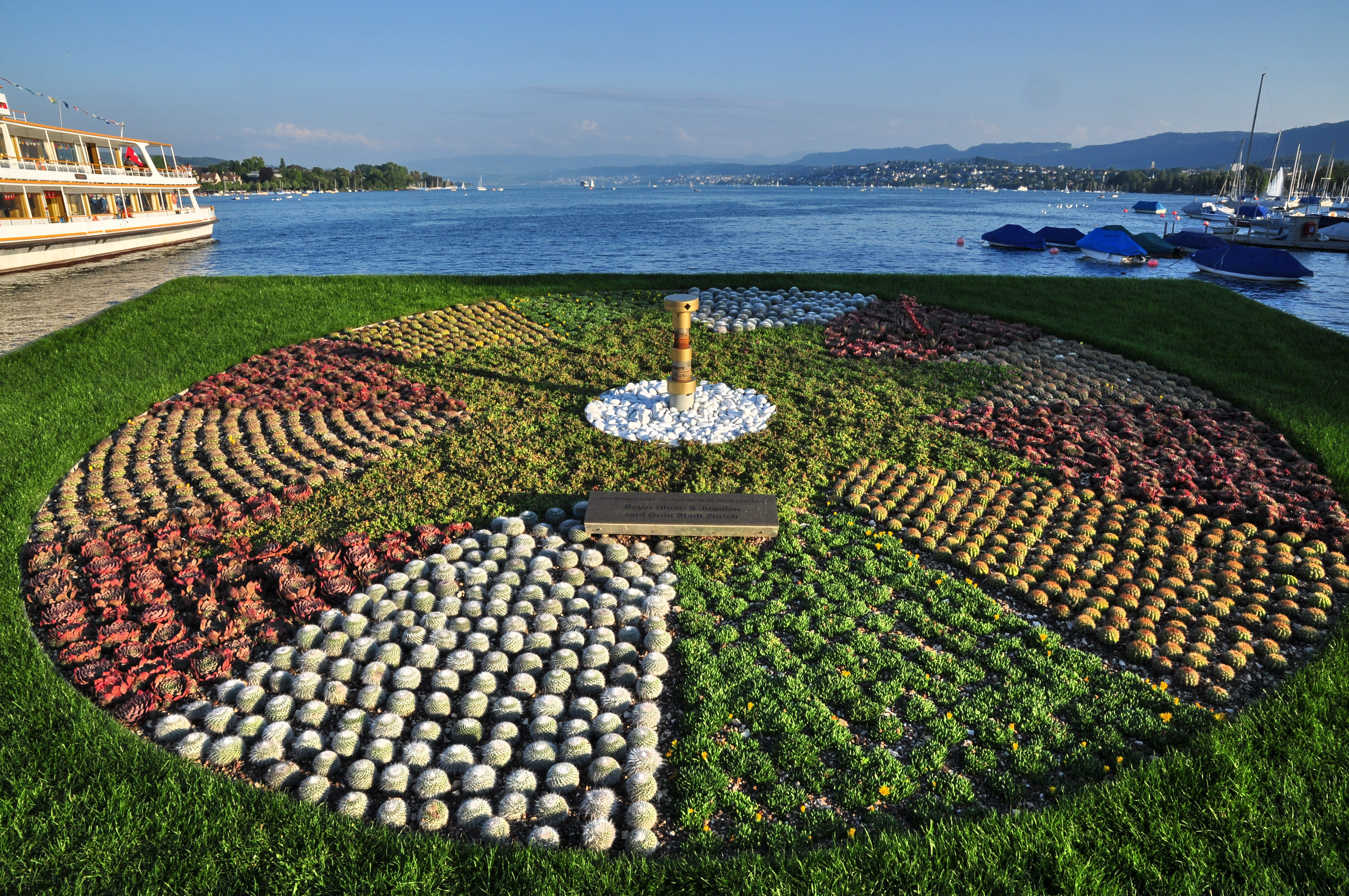
Zürich, Switzerland

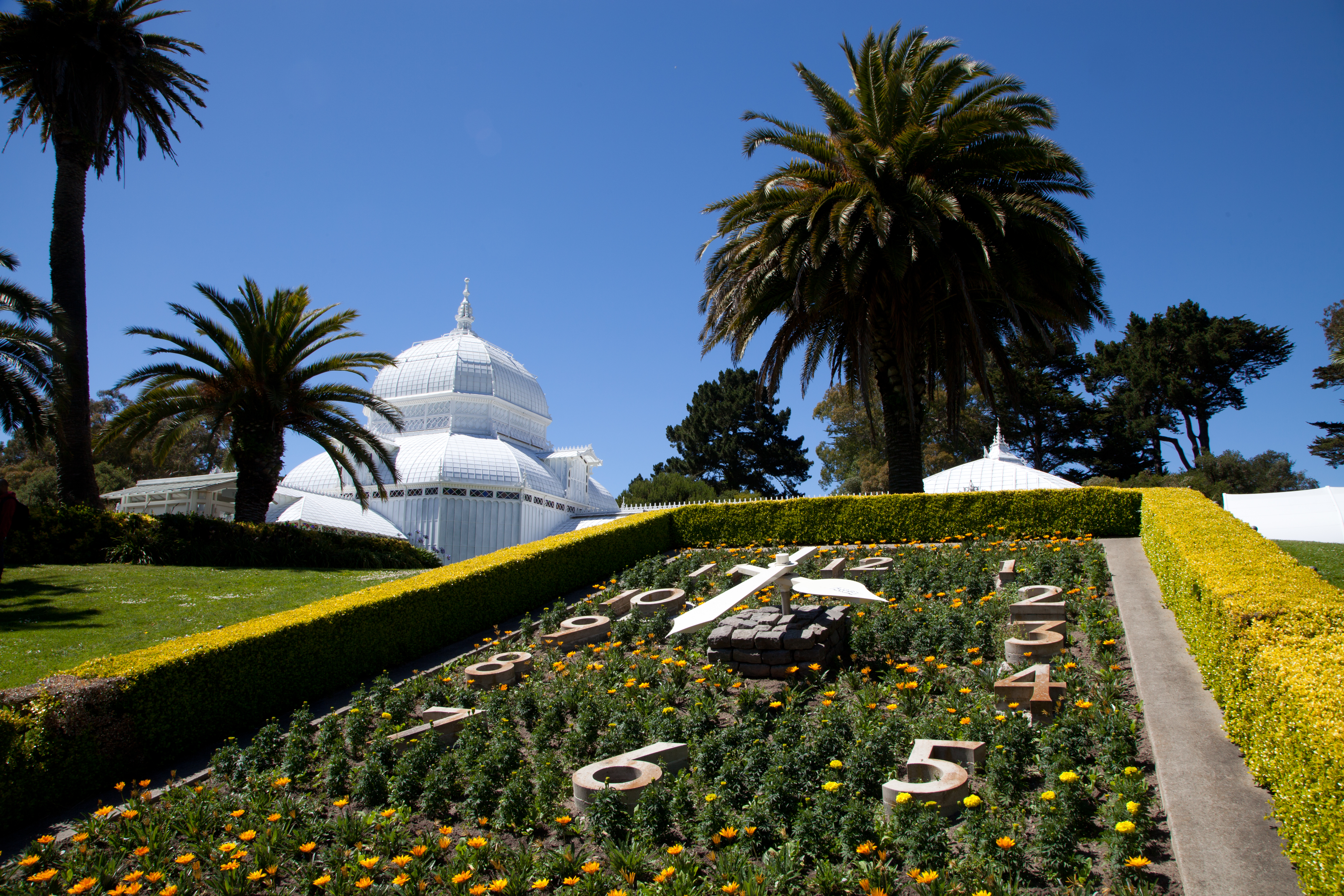
San Francisco, USA

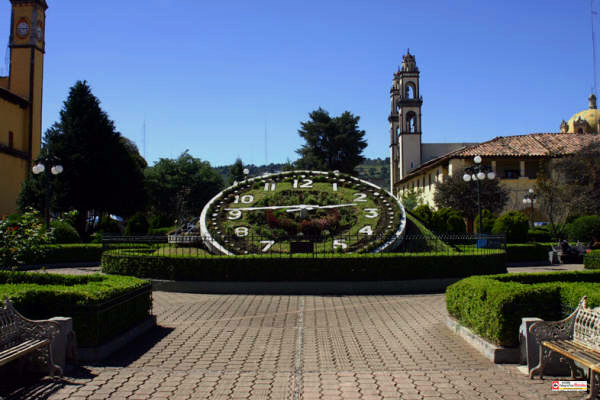
Zacatlán, Mexico

Tehran, Iran

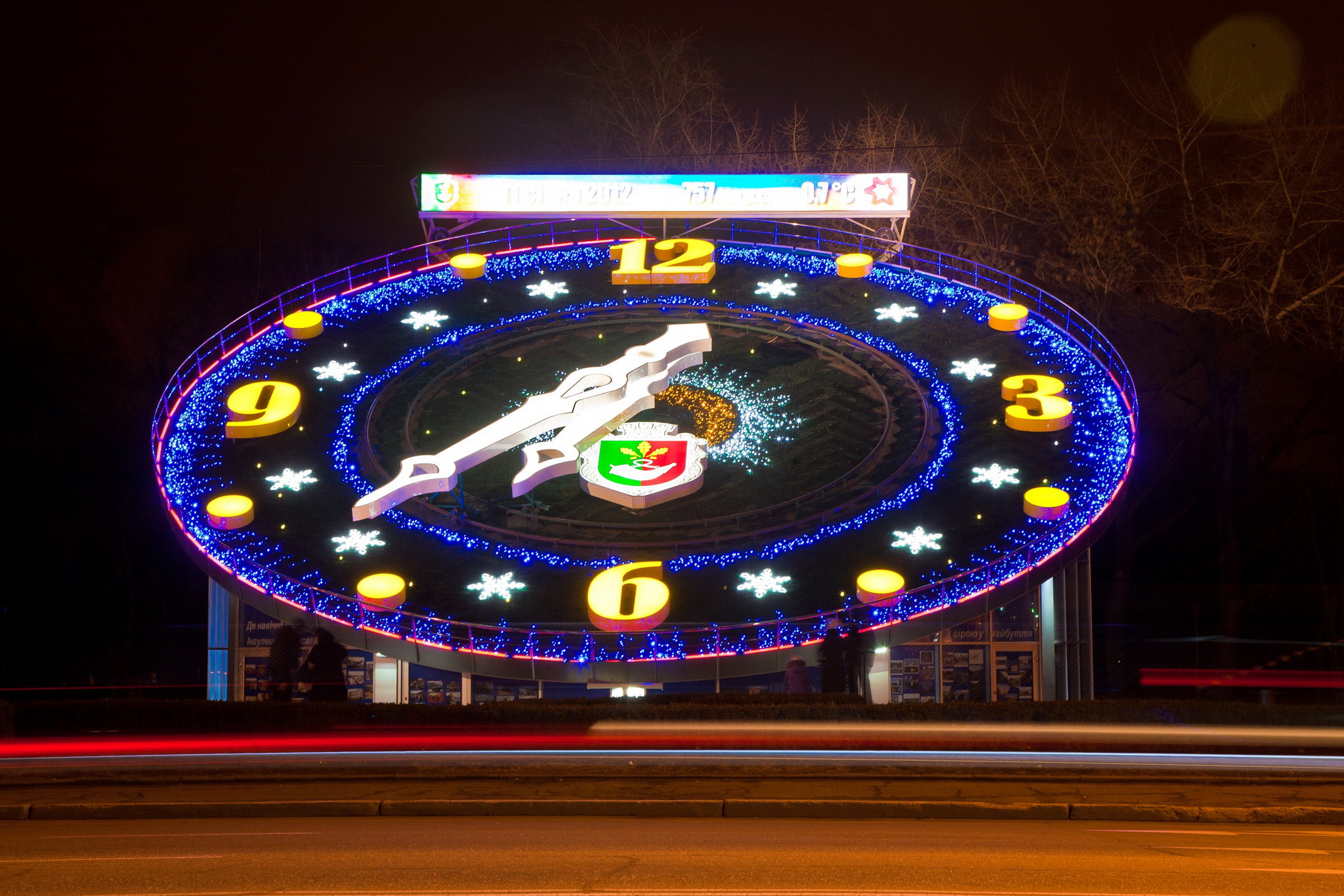
Europe's largest floral clock, Kryvyy Rih, Ukraine

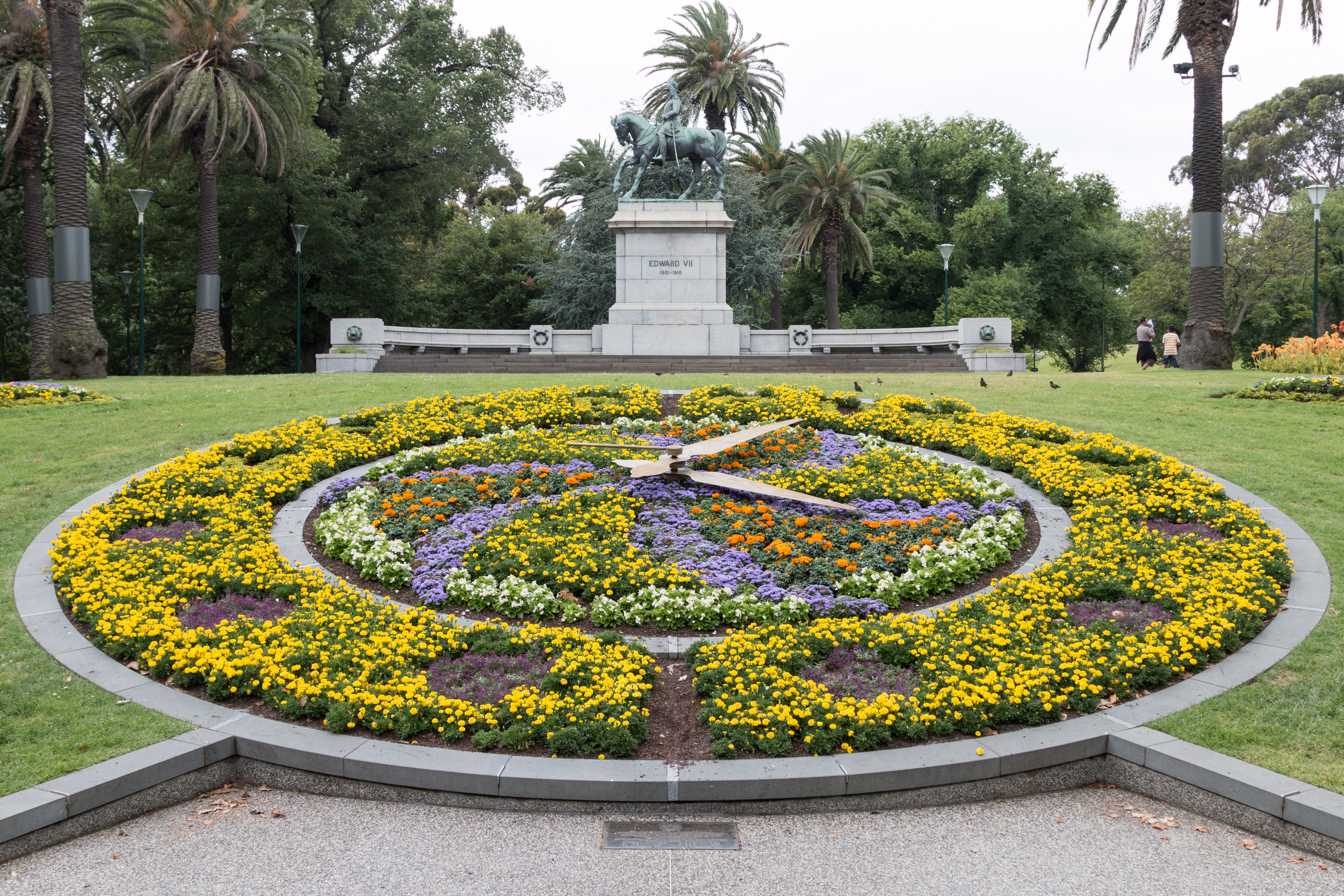
Melbourne, Australia

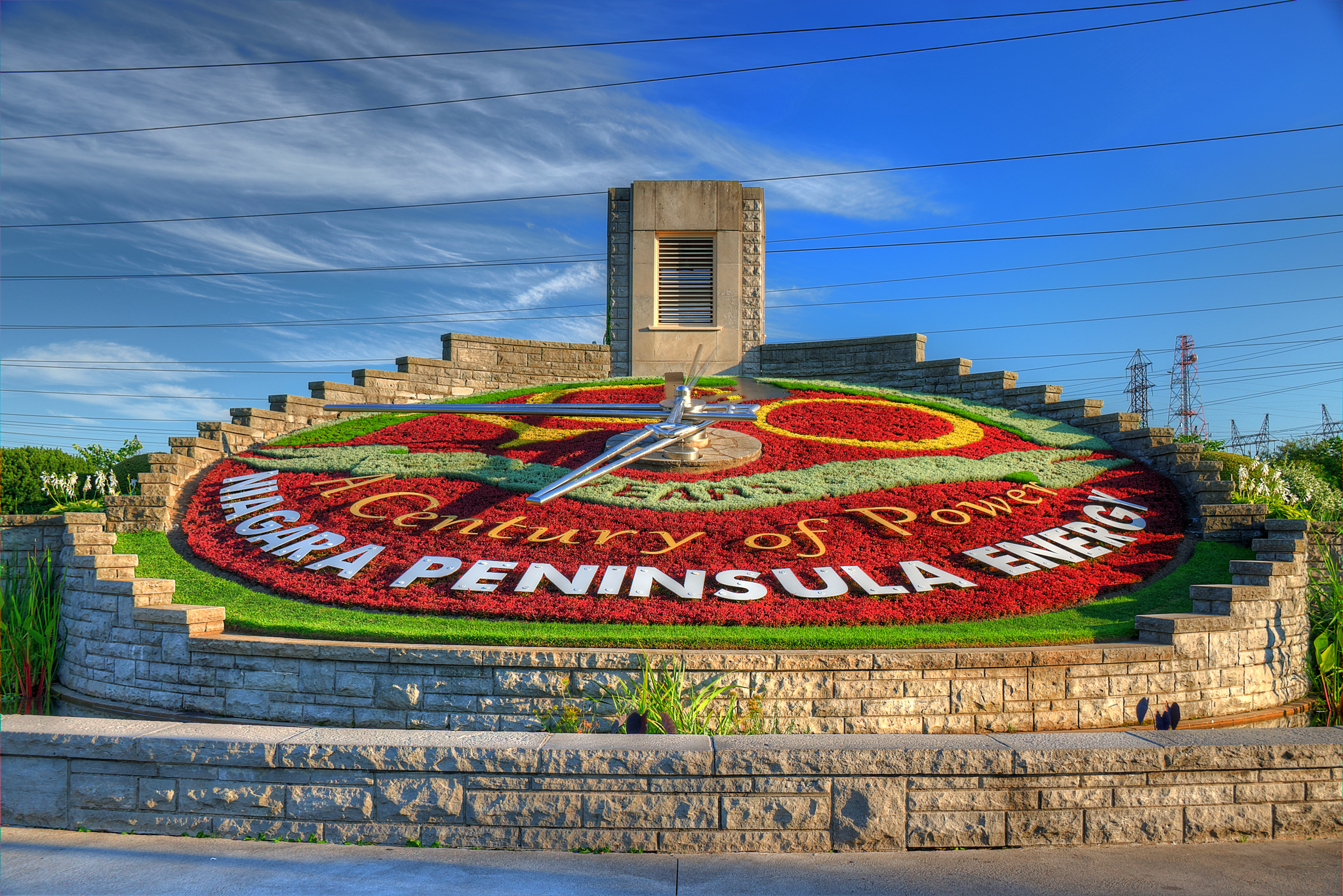
Niagara Parks Floral Clock (2015)

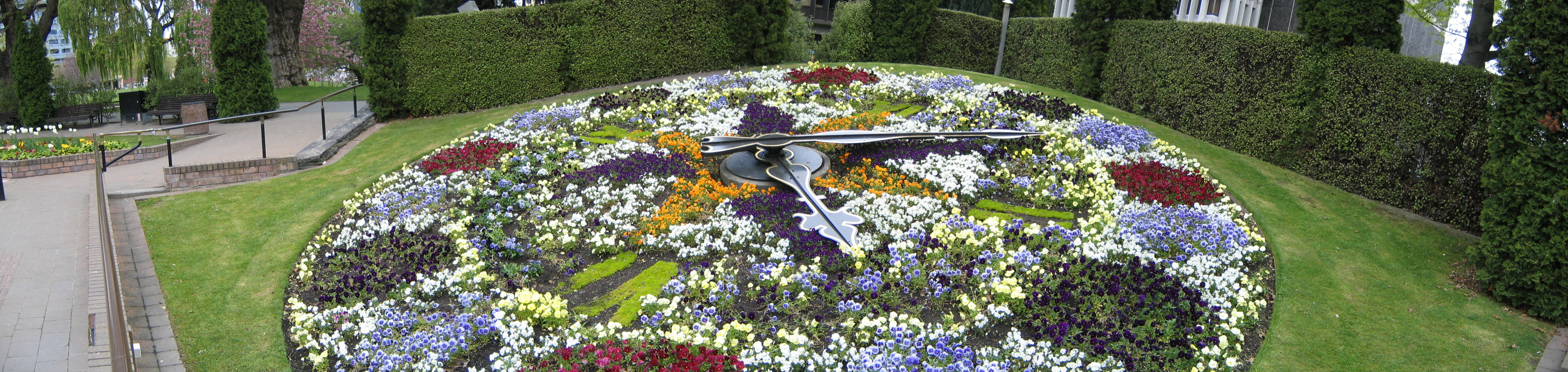
Christchurch, New Zealand

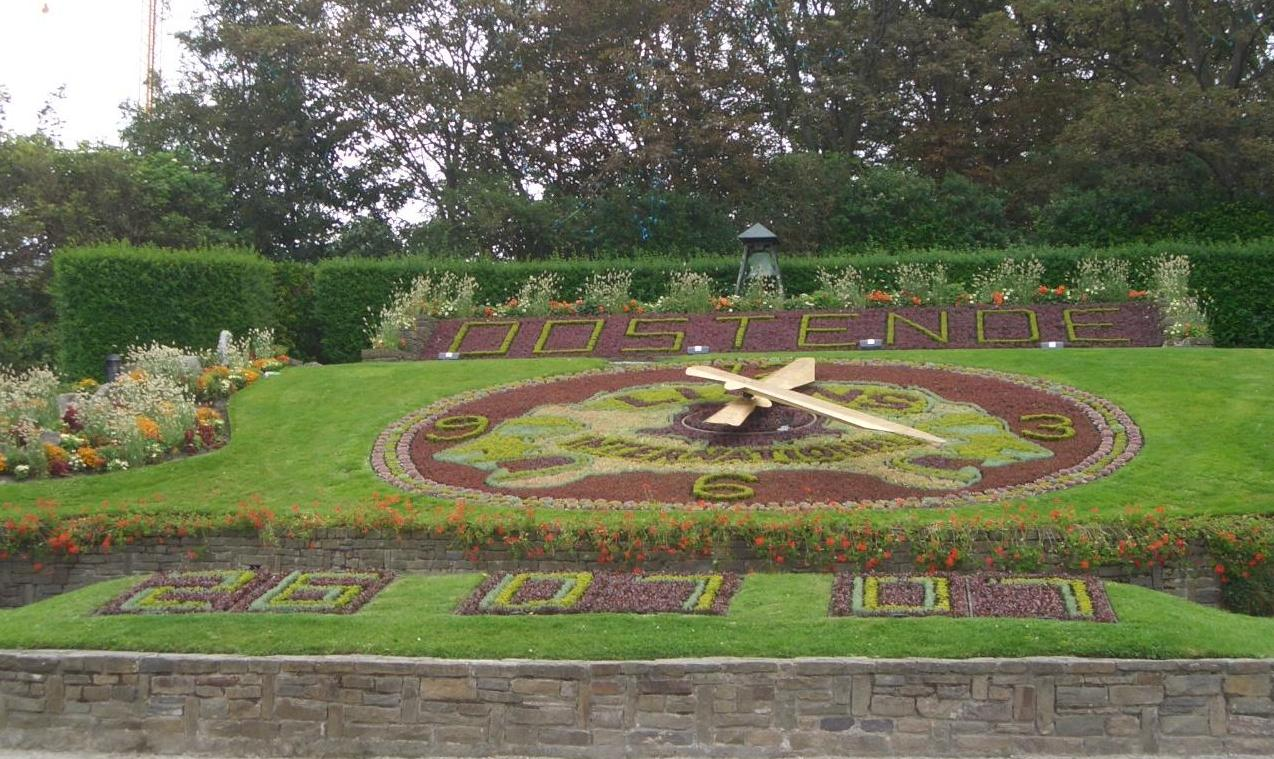
Ostend, Belgium

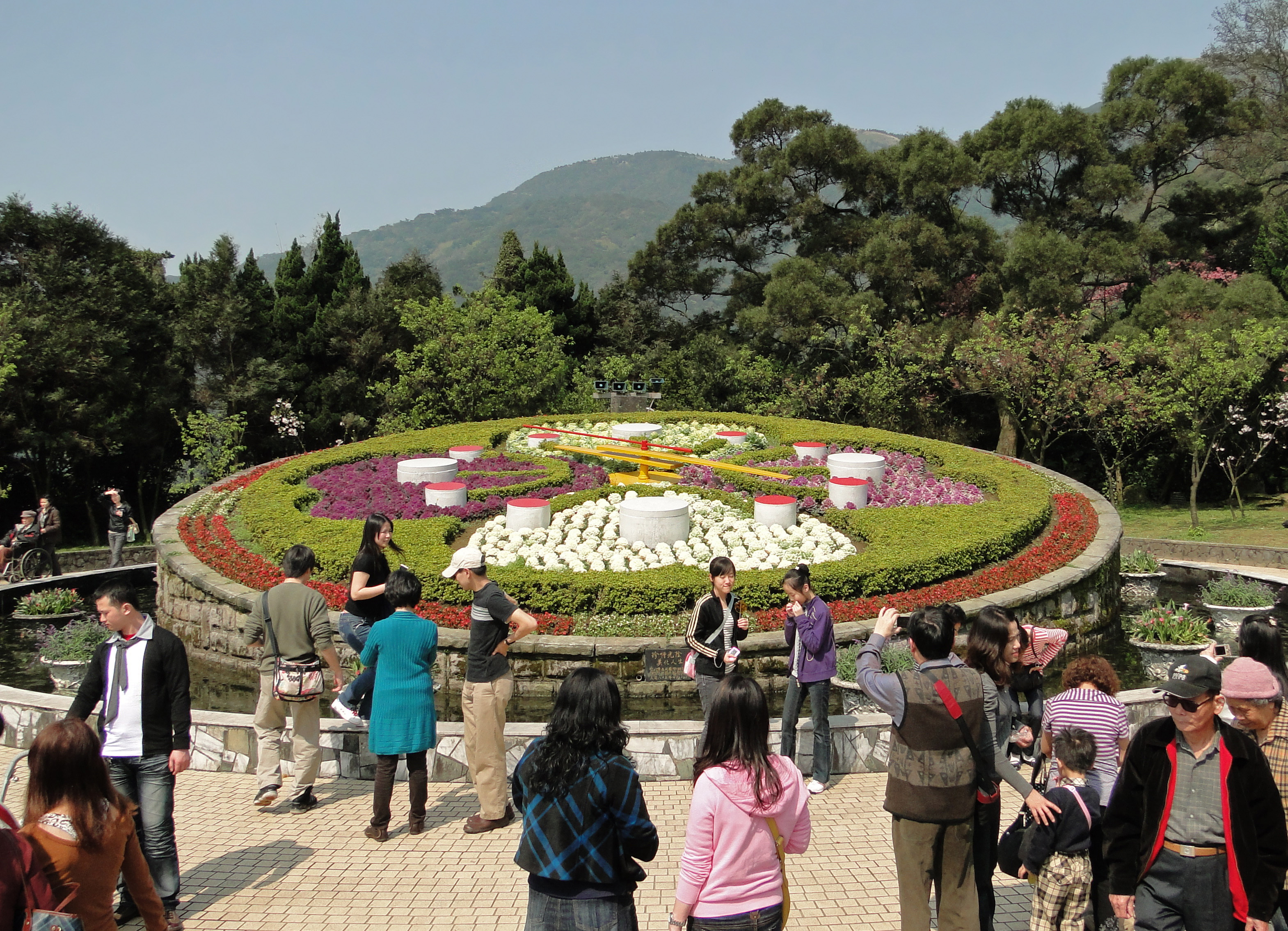
Flower Clock in Yangmingshan, Taipei, Taiwan

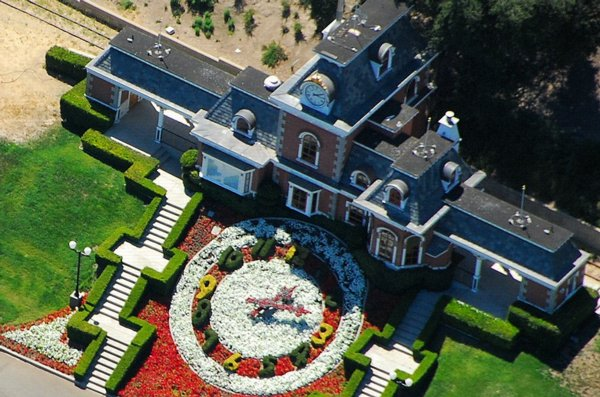
Floral Clock at Neverland Ranch's train station in Los Olivos, California

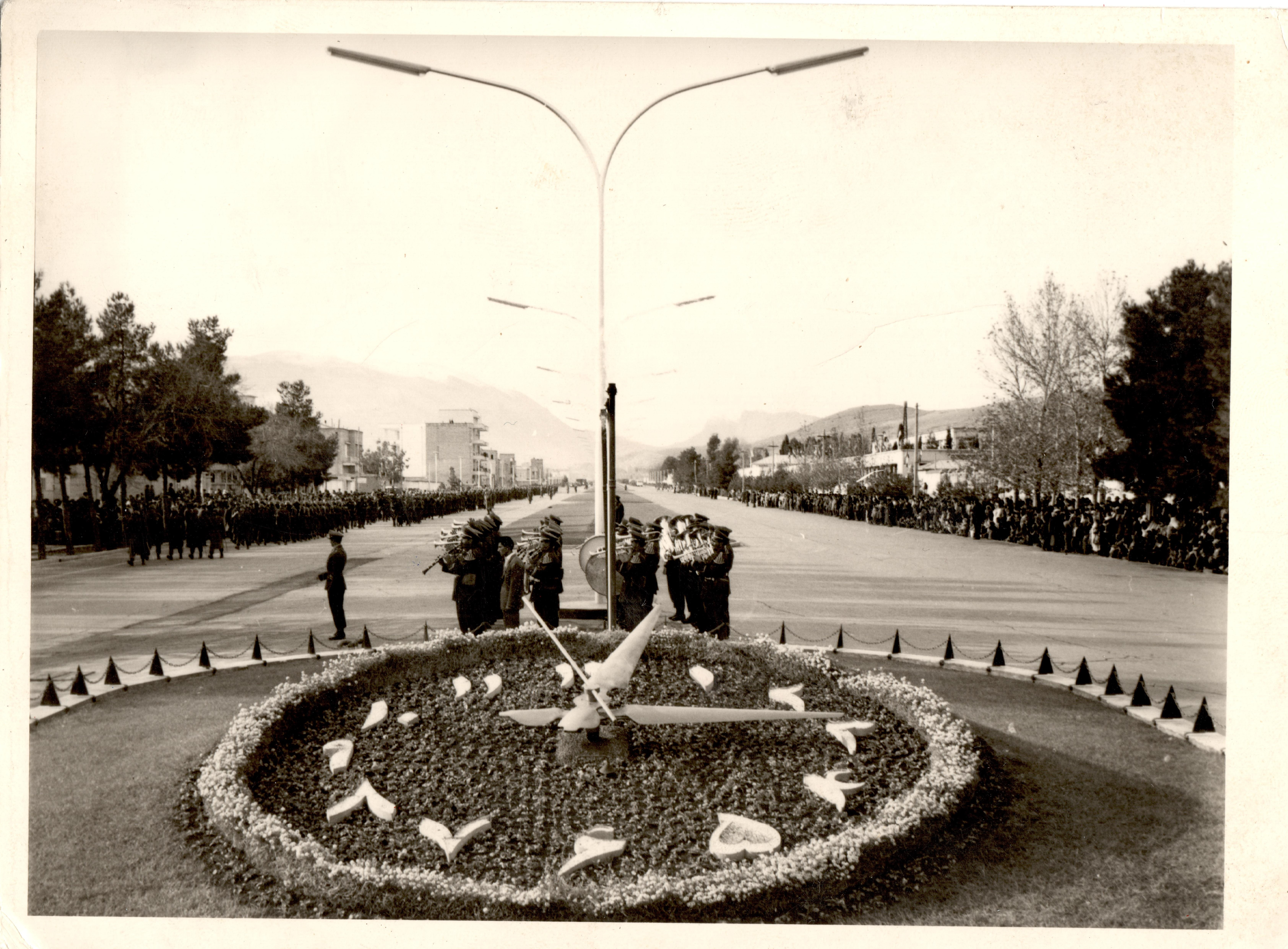
Shiraz, Iran, 1961

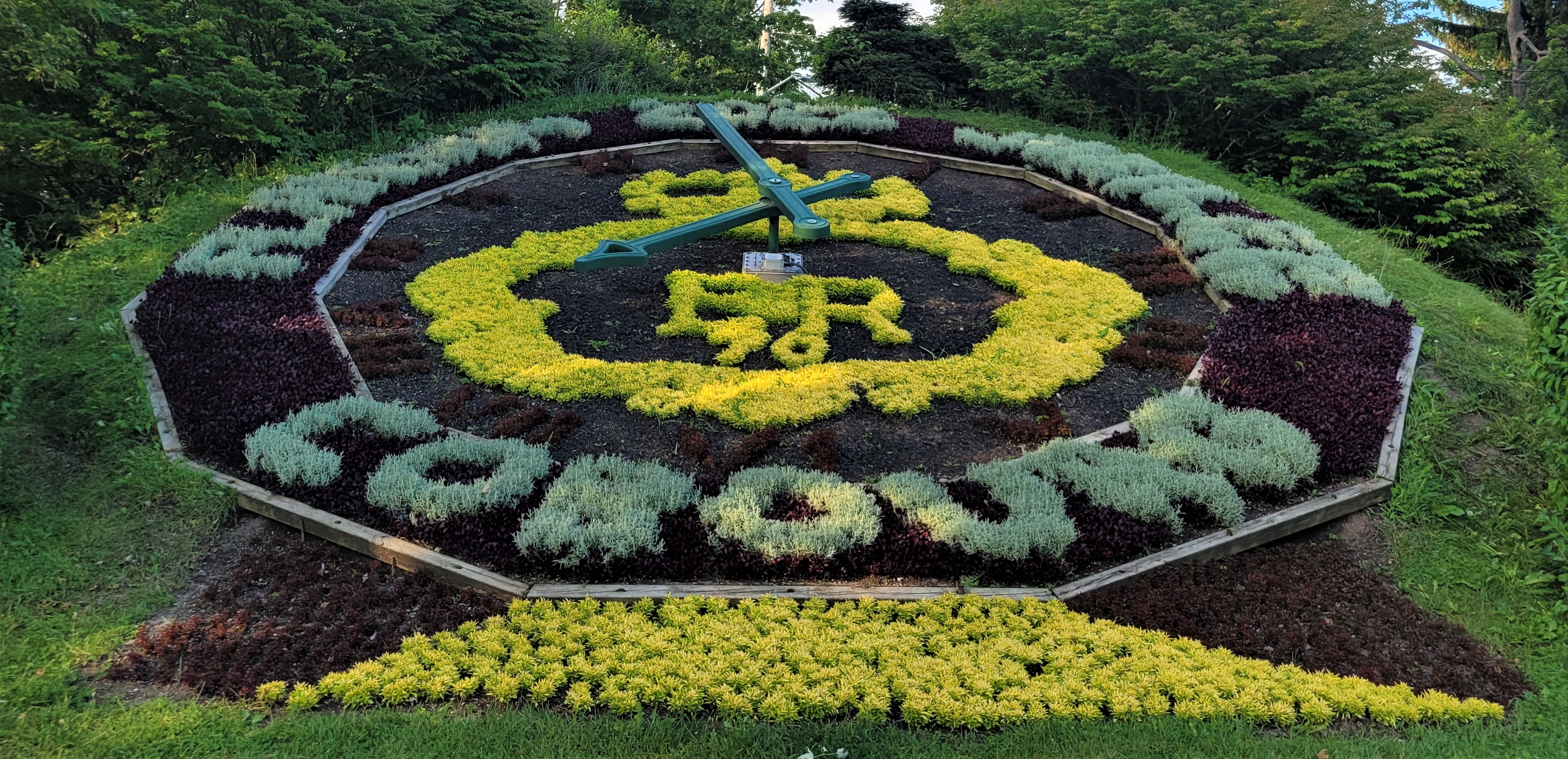
Cobourg, Canada

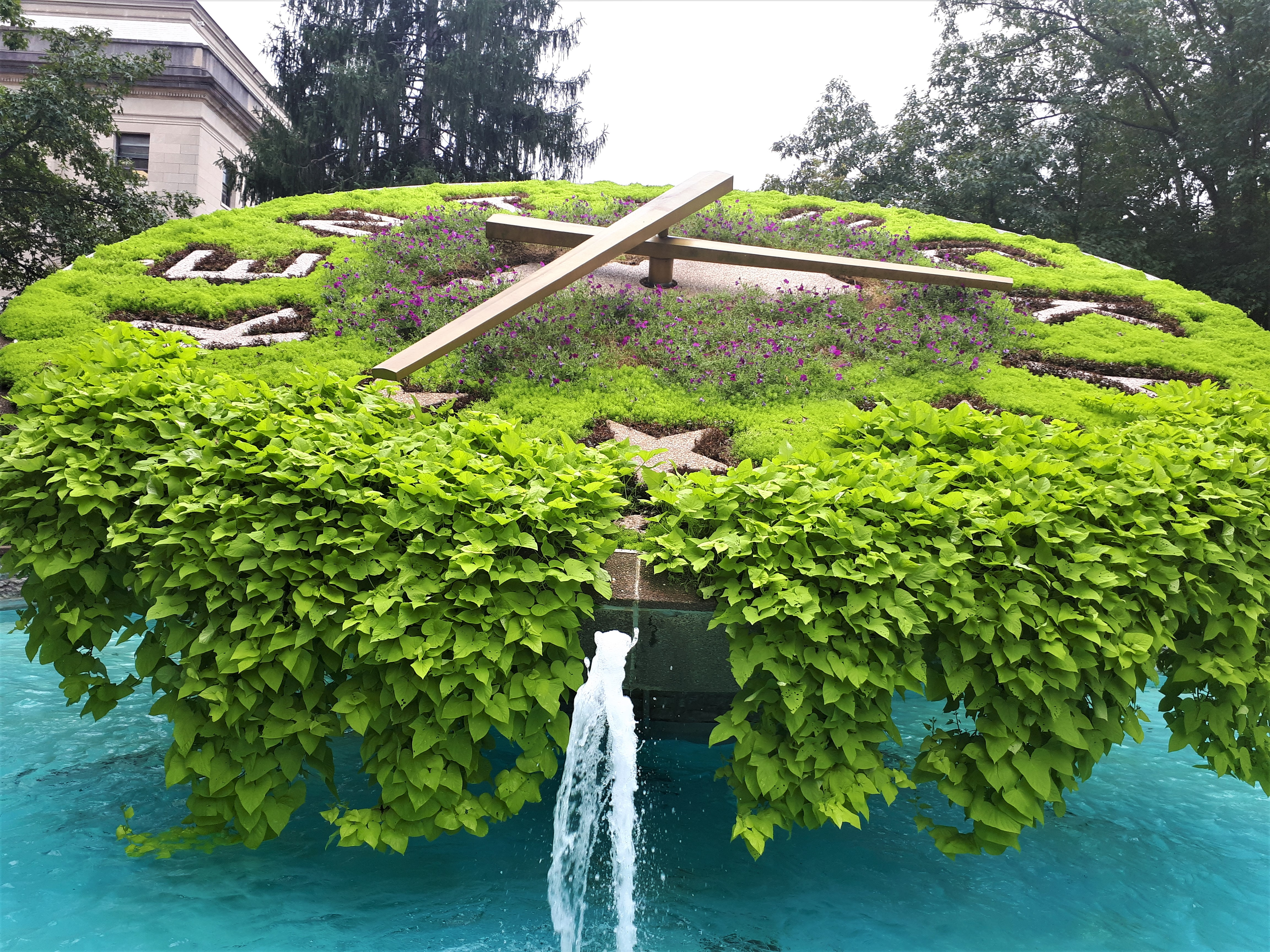
Floral clock (Frankfort, Kentucky), USA

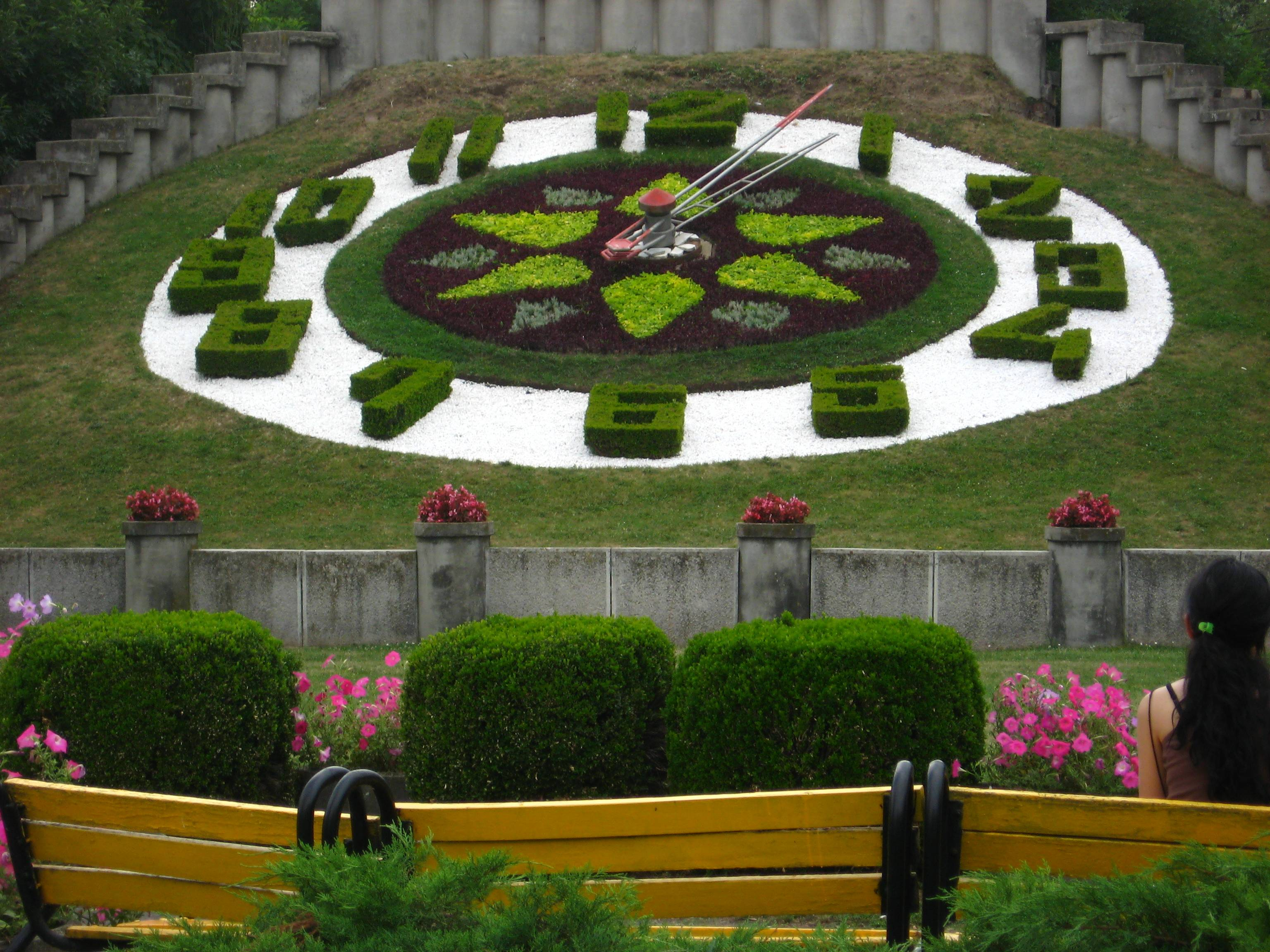
Civic Park, Timișoara, Romania

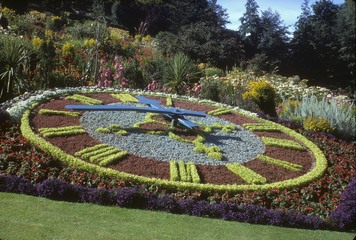
Carlisle Park, Morpeth, United Kingdom
