= The Remnant Trust =

The Remnant Trust, Inc.
- Type: Non-profit organization
- Founded: 1997
- Headquarters: Executive Headquarters: Indianapolis, Indiana, United States
- Key people: Chris Talley, Chairman and CEO
- Website: Remnant Trust

The Remnant Trust, Inc. is an educational foundation located in Indianapolis, Indiana. It houses a collection of original and first edition works dealing with topics including individual liberty and human dignity. Some of the Trust's pieces date back as early as 1250. The Trust makes its collection available to colleges, universities, and other organizations for use by students, faculty, scholars and the general public. Those exposed are encouraged to touch, feel and read the originals.

== History ==
The Remnant Trust was established in 1997 by Brian Bex, an entrepreneur and television host noted for his politically conservative viewpoints. Bex accumulated a large collection of rare books and materials relating to American history and the theme of political liberty. Initially operating from a base in Hagerstown, Indiana, Bex began making these materials available on loan to colleges. By 2006, the collection had moved to a new home in a renovated Carnegie Library at Warder Park in Jeffersonville, Indiana.

In 2009, the Trust announced that it would move again, due to disagreements with the library foundation over the condition of the building. The Trust relocated to the former Billy Sunday museum at Grace College in Winona Lake, Indiana. In April 2014, a new permanent home for the collection was announced, at the Southwest Collection/Special Collections Library at Texas Tech University in Lubbock, Texas. In January 2022, the Trust relocated to Indianapolis, Indiana.
