= News and Tribune =

American newspaper in Indiana, founded 1851

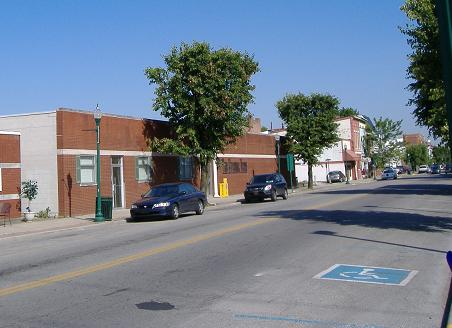
- The Jeffersonville office of the News and Tribune.
- Type: Daily newspaper
- Format: Broadsheet
- Owner: Community Newspaper Holdings Inc.
- Publisher: Bill Hanson
- Editor: Shea Van Hoy
- Founded: 1851 (175 years ago)
- Relaunched: 2011 (15 years ago)
- Headquarters: 221 Spring Street, Jeffersonville, Indiana 47130; 318 Pearl Street, Suite 100, New Albany, Indiana 47150 United States
- Circulation: 7,152 daily (News); 5,339 daily (Tribune)
- Website: newsandtribune.com

The News and Tribune is a six-day (Monday through Saturday) daily newspaper serving Clark and Floyd counties in Indiana. It is owned by Community Newspaper Holdings Inc, and based out of Jeffersonville, Indiana. Aside from its flagship publication, the N&T also publishes SoIn, a Thursday entertainment feature, periodical business and fitness magazines, and annual election guides and government statistics guides. The N&T also publishes jail booking information for both counties Tuesday through Saturday, periodic police run information, and on Saturdays publishes church information, milestones, a listing of marriage license recipients, and a full-color comics section.

In 1851, both The Evening News in Clark County and The Tribune in Floyd County began publication; in March 2011, the two papers merged. For several years prior to the merger, the two papers had already shared certain resources, including a shared website. Offices are maintained in both counties; its Clark County headquarters, which also houses the main offices, are located at the former Evening News office on Spring Street, within the Old Jeffersonville Historic District, and its Floyd County headquarters are in the former Tribune office in New Albany.

The News and Tribune maintains a news gathering and reporting partnership with Louisville NBC affiliate WAVE.
