= Barney Bright =

American sculptor (1927–1997)

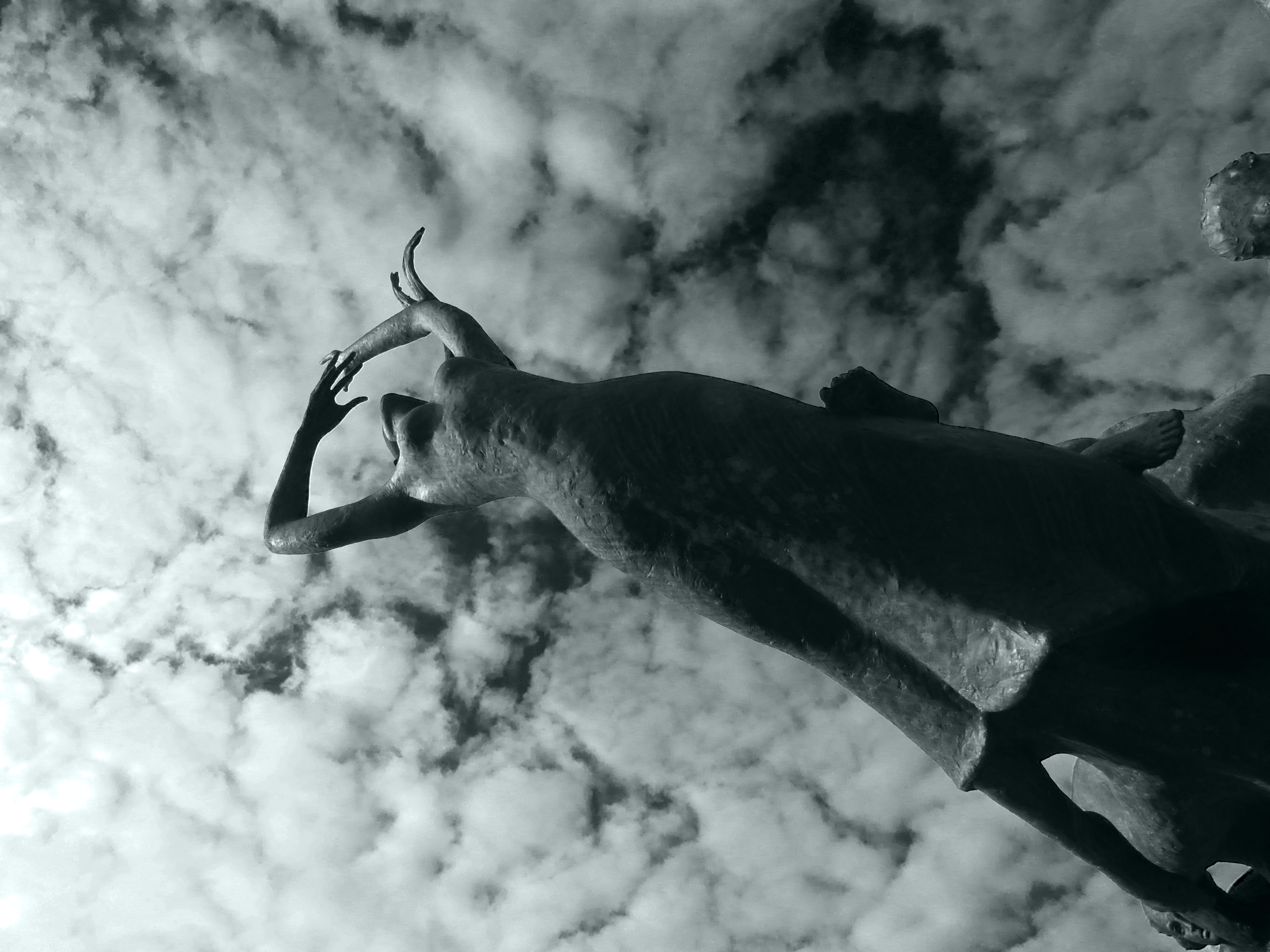
- Born: Jeptha Barnard Bright Jr; July 8, 1927; Shelbyville, Kentucky, U.S.
- Died: July 23, 1997 (aged 70); Louisville, Kentucky, U.S.
- Resting place: Cave Hill Cemetery; Louisville, Kentucky, U.S.
- Known for: Sculpture
- Notable work: Louisville Clock

Jeptha Barnard Bright Jr (July 8, 1927 – July 23, 1997), better known as Barney Bright, born in Shelby County, Kentucky and was a sculptor from Louisville, Kentucky, is best known for his work on the Louisville Clock.

== Biography ==
Bright was born in Shelbyville, Kentucky on July 8, 1927. He would excel in school projects growing up.

Barney Bright had his own sculpting business called the Bright Foundry in which other prominent sculptors Ed Hamilton who he worked with from 1973 to 1978 and Raymond Graf was mentored by him. During the 1950s, Bright would be commissioned to do several sculptures near fountains for various buildings. Several of these were made in bronze.

Barney Bright would begin construction on the well-known Louisville Clock in 1974, a year after the initial project was intended to be completed. The location was to be placed at the River City Mall (now known as Fourth Street Live!), but the developers easily became absent-minded about the original intentions until former Louisville mayor Wilson W. Wyatt mentioned it to local leaders in 1973. They then interviewed numerous artists to do the job and eventually selected Bright. After the original concept was scaled back considerably to conform to the budgeting, Bright would work on building the clock and have it dedicated in front of 3,000 people on December 3, 1976. He created a memorial sculpture at the Cave Hill Cemetery in Louisville, Kentucky, for former fashion model Saundra Curry Twist, who died in a 1981 car accident at age 39.

Other notable works accomplished by Bright were the River Horse Romano in front of the Mazzoli Federal Building's entrance, and the Winged Man, Icarus. He was also commissioned by the City of Philadelphia to create the statue of basketball legend Julius Erving.

Prior to Bright's death in 1997, he released a 36-page book titled Barney Bright: A Fifty Year Celebration.

After retirement, the Brights spent a portion of their year in Louisville and a portion in Europe. Bright died at the age of 70 on July 23, 1997, from lung cancer. He is buried in Cave Hill Cemetery in Louisville.

== See also ==
- Untitled, a sculpture by Bright located in Jeffersonville, Indiana.
