= St. Paul's German Evangelical Church =

Historic church in Kentucky, United States

- St. Paul's German Evangelical Church and Parish House
- U.S. National Register of Historic Places
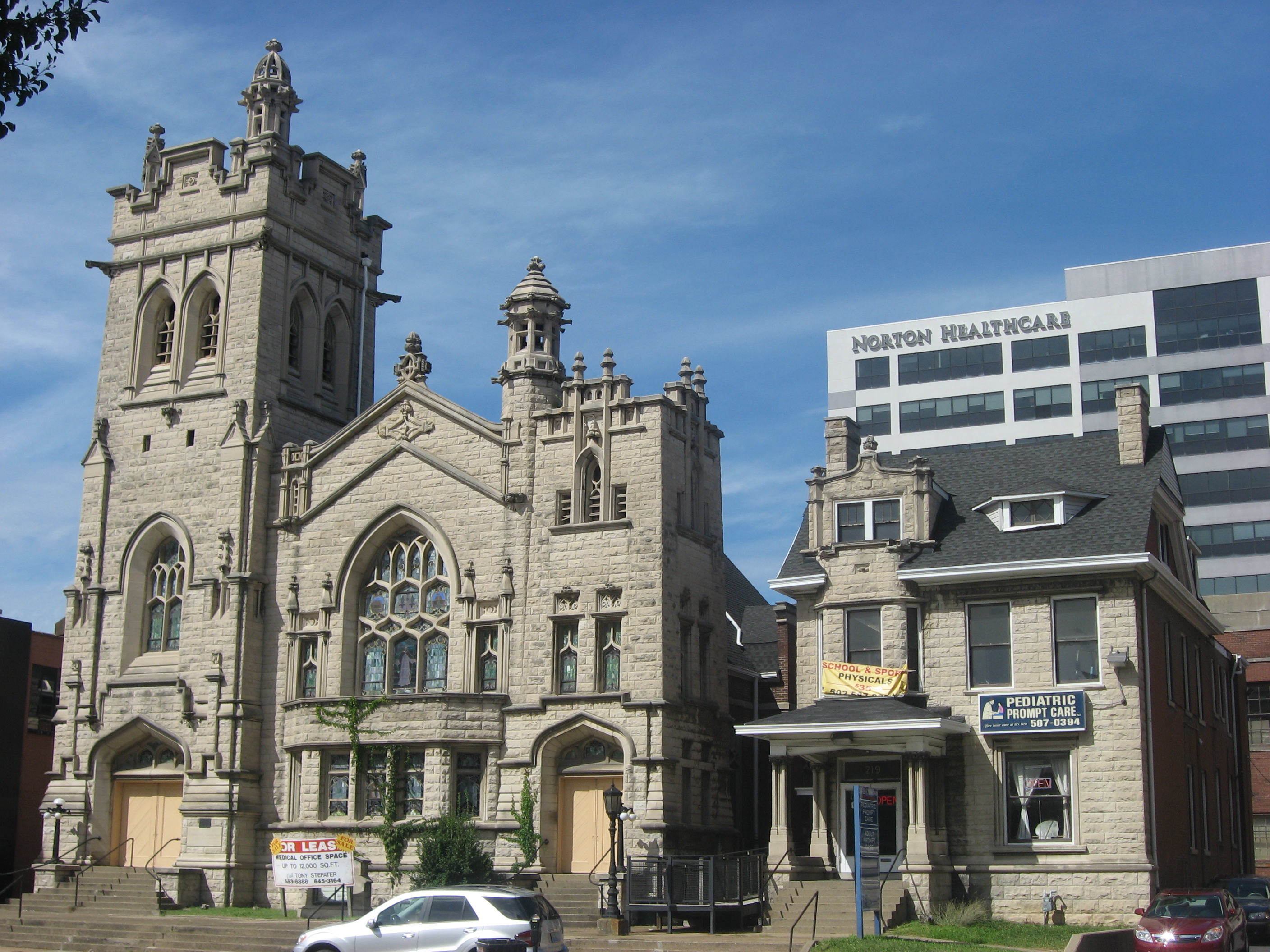
- View from across Broadway

- Location within Kentucky Location within the United States
- Location: 213 E. Broadway, Louisville, Kentucky
- Coordinates: 38°14′45″N 85°45′3″W
- Area: Less than 1 acre (0.40 ha)
- Built: 1906
- Architect: Clarke and Loomis
- Architectural style: Late Gothic Revival
- NRHP reference No.: 82002724
- Added to NRHP: February 25, 1982

St. Paul's German Evangelical Church was the first German Evangelical Church to be established in Louisville, Kentucky, USA. It was founded in 1836 by Reverend George Brandau.

On October 9, 2024, the church was heavily damaged by a massive fire that took firefighters over 3 hours to fully extinguish. The church was not in use at the time and had been boarded up.
