= Old Jeffersonville Historic District =

Historic district in Indiana, United States

- U.S. National Register of Historic Places
- U.S. Historic district
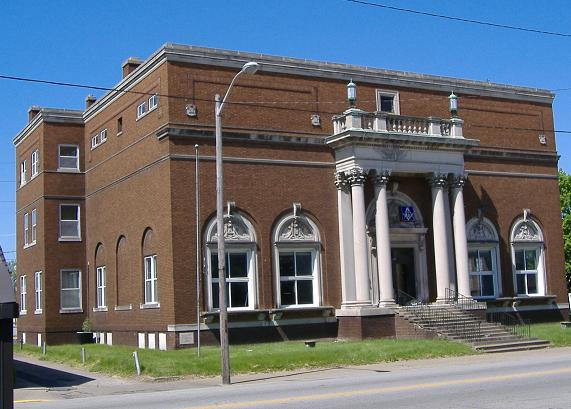
- 20th-century Masonic temple

- Location within Clark County, Indiana Location within Indiana Location within the United States
- Location: Roughly bounded by Court Ave., Graham St., Ohio River, & I-65, Jeffersonville, Indiana
- Coordinates: 38°16′26″N 85°44′11″W
- Area: 203 acres (82 ha)
- Architect: Arthur Loomis, et al.
- Architectural style: Late 19th And 20th Century Revivals, Bungalow/Craftsman, Late Victorian
- NRHP reference No.: 87001461
- Added to NRHP: October 6, 1987

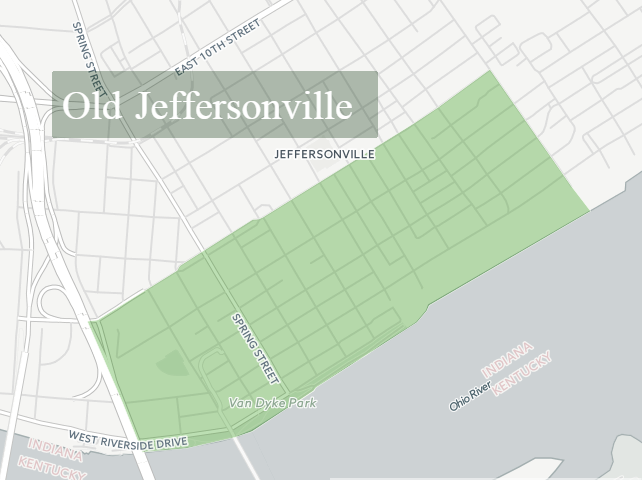
Old Jeffersonville

The Old Jeffersonville Historic District is located in Jeffersonville, Indiana, United States. It marks the original boundaries of Jeffersonville, and is the heart of modern-day downtown Jeffersonville. It was placed on the National Register of Historic Places in 1983. The area is roughly bounded by Court Avenue at the North, Graham Street on the east, the Ohio River at the south, and Interstate 65 at the west. In total, the district has 203 acres (0.8 km^{2}), 500 buildings, 6 structures, and 11 objects. Several banks are located in the historic buildings in the district. The now defunct Steamboat Days Festival, held on the second weekend in September, used to be held on Spring Street and the waterfront. Jeffersonville's largest fire wiped out a block in the historic district on January 11, 2004, which destroyed the original Horner's Novelty store.

Several important buildings are located in the district. At Warder Park the old Carnegie Library still stands, one of many built throughout Indiana in the early 20th century. Across Spring Street from Warder Park is the Old Masonic Temple, built in the early 20th century, with a majestic marble staircase. The local office of the Historic Landmarks Foundation of Indiana maintains the historic Grisamore House, its former office, and the Willey-Allhands House, its current office, which are located beside each other. Schimpff's Confectionery is well known its candies, especially its red-hots and Modjelskas (a caramel-covered marshmallow confection). Horner's Novelty, a long-time commercial supplier of party supplies and costumes that was rebuilt after a fire, is also included in the landmark boundaries.

== History ==
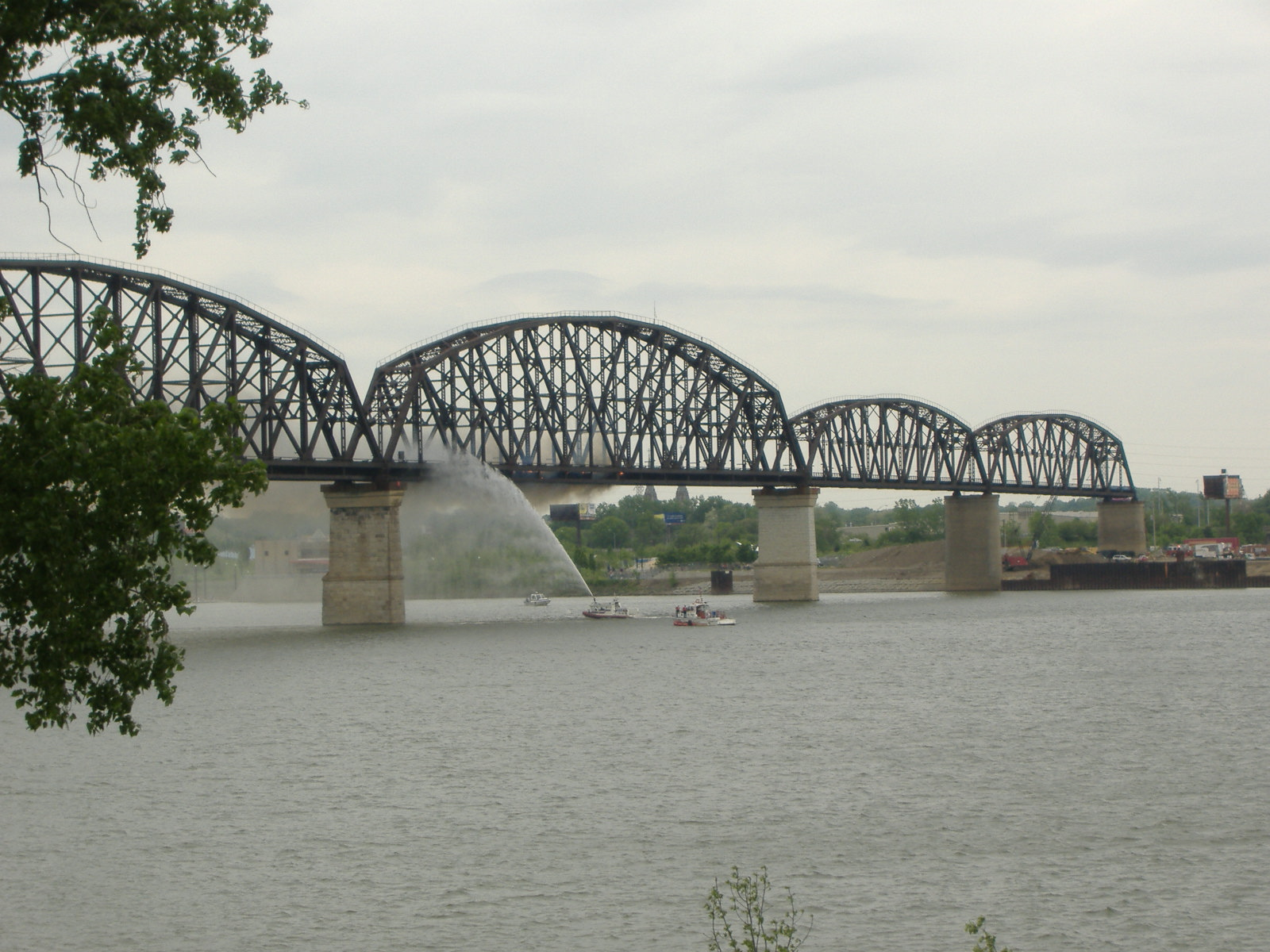
Big Four Bridge

The first settlement in what later became Jeffersonville was just above the Falls of the Ohio, the only natural barrier along the entire length of the Ohio River. Because of its location above the falls, Jeffersonville has the deepest harbor of any nearby town. The settlement was established in 1786 at Finney, near the present day Big Four Bridge. In June 1802, Lieutenant Isaac Bowman had 150 acres (0.61 km^{2}) of land, known as Section No. 1, awarded to him for his service in the American Revolutionary War as part of Clark's Grant.

Jeffersonville started as three streets that paralleled the Ohio River: Water Street (gone), Front Street (Riverside Drive) and Market Street. In 1802 John Gwathemey was appointed to plat the land north of Market Street using a plan devised by Thomas Jefferson. This plan deviated from Jefferson's original with the use of diagonal streets in the open checkerboard. By 1816 this plan proved to be unworkable and was re-platted by order of the Indiana Legislature (An Act to Change the Plan of the Town of Jeffersonville) in 1817. In 1836 a Cincinnati civil engineer (H. L. Barnum) was hired to plot the northern expansion of the town. This plan was again an attempt to use Jefferson's original. The plan was rejected by the town council and another plan from a local civil engineer (Edmund F. Lee) was accepted. At the time Cincinnati was the major town in the area and subsequent map makers used the Barnum map as their primary source. Consequently, most maps of Jeffersonville from 1837 to about 1852 are in error.

From its heyday of the 1850s until the Great Depression in the 1930s, Jeffersonville was the leading center of U.S. steamboat production, due largely to its excellent harbor, which remained the deepest in the surrounding area. Many individuals who lived in the district worked at the Howard Shipyards, that became Jeffboat in the nearby town of Port Fulton, which was eventually annexed into Jeffersonville. The town gained its first railroad in 1852, connecting to Columbus, Indiana, and with the opening of the Fourteenth Street Bridge in 1870, became a railroad center. The city became an important distribution center during the Civil War for the Union Army, because three railroads connected to Jeffersonville and because the Ohio River served as a defensive barrier against invasion from Confederate attack, it was deemed a safer location than the more vulnerable city of Louisville, Kentucky located on the southern side of the river.

Most of the buildings still standing in the district were built after 1870. The majority of the commercial buildings along Spring Street are Italianate styles and Gothic Revival churches reflecting the large immigrations from Ireland and Germany that came during the time period. The residential buildings are generally of the American Four Square style, bungalows, and shotgun houses.

Until the mid-1950s, the district was a significant commercial area, including a J.C.Penney department store. However, with the construction of Youngstown Shopping Center 1.5 miles (2.4 km) northwest of the downtown area on 10th Street/Indiana State Road 62, the district began its decline. The decline was completed when Green Tree Mall was built in the 1960s, taking Penney's with it. By the 1980s over twenty store fronts were empty, leaving the bulk of the stores in the district occupied by antique shops, thrift stores, or repair technicians.

== Streets ==
The district is served by a northwest–southeast primary road called Spring Street. From Spring Street are five secondary streets going southwest to northeast; starting from the Ohio River and going the north the secondary streets are Riverside Drive, Market Street, Chestnut Street, Maple Street, and ending with Court Avenue.

Spring Street, a typical commercial 19th century corridor, is the primary roadway within the district. Most buildings along Spring Street are Italianate and eclectic Victorian. The structure vary between two and three stories tall, with brick as the most common building material. The 100 block is the closest to the Ohio River and has seen the most demolition. It contains the Old Strauss Hotel at the corner of Riverside Drive, a three-story Italianate hostelry with a corbeled cornice and arched windows. The buildings on the 200 block are mostly Italianate style buildings, the most notable being the old Elk's Club structure (a three-story highly decorated glazed brick building) and the Bensinger's Building (a 1920s commercial building of pressed brick and crenelated parapet). There is more diverse architecture on the 300-block, with a 19th-century Masonic Temple, the LaRose Theatre (a 1920s orange glazed brick structure with terra cotta trim), Horner's Novelty (which had to be rebuilt after the worst fire in Jeffersonville's history), and Schimpff's Confectionery, a candy store that opened in 1891 that now also features a small candy museum. More Italianate structures are on the 400 block, but its most important structure is the 1907 Citizens National Bank Building, which is stone Classical Revival with large eagles for adornment. The block also holds the regional office for the local Boy Scouts of America council. Warder Park is located on the east side of the 500 block and features a Classical Revival Masonic Temple that used for most of the 20th Century.

At the southeast end of Spring Street is Riverside Drive, which provides some of the most scenic views of the Ohio River and the eastern Louisville shoreline because of the limited alterations compared to other sections of the Ohio River in the Louisville area. Houseboats are docked along the Ohio River on the south side of Riverside Drive. The north side of Riverside Drive has a variety of architectural styles and is mostly residential. Unlike the other prominent streets, Riverside drive is outside the flood wall that surrounds most of the city and was built two feet higher than the height the Ohio River flood of 1937.

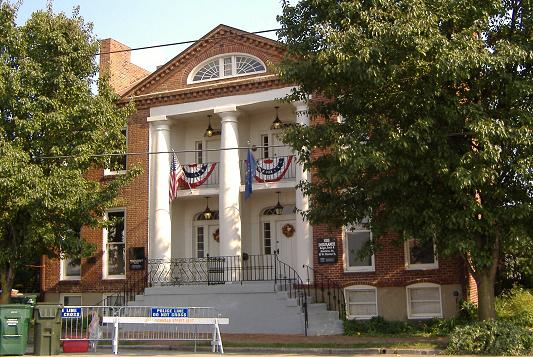
Grisamore House

Market Street is largely residential, its 200 block has many vacant areas, but the 300–500 blocks features many shotgun houses. As Market Streets proceeds eastward out of the district, it becomes known as Utica Pike near the Howard Steamboat Museum and connects Jeffersonville with Utica, Indiana. North of Market Street, few buildings remain that date before 1850, making the character of the district during the early time frame unknowable.

Chestnut Street is also largely residential. The 200 block of West Chestnut features old supports for the Big Four Bridge and the 100 block of West Chestnut holds the Grisamore House, which was separately placed on the National Register of Historic Places in 1983. On East Chestnut, the 100 block contains many houses built around 1900 and the 200 block is filled with bungalows. St. Augustine Roman Catholic Church, a Spanish-flavored neo-Baroque structure with a Moorish-styled rectory, is located on the 300 block of East Chestnut. Another church is located on the 400 block including the Gothic Revival style First Presbyterian Church (with lancet windows and belltower), and a typical Works Progress Administration Art Modern school whose cruciform plan has a stuccoed facade and metal casement windows.

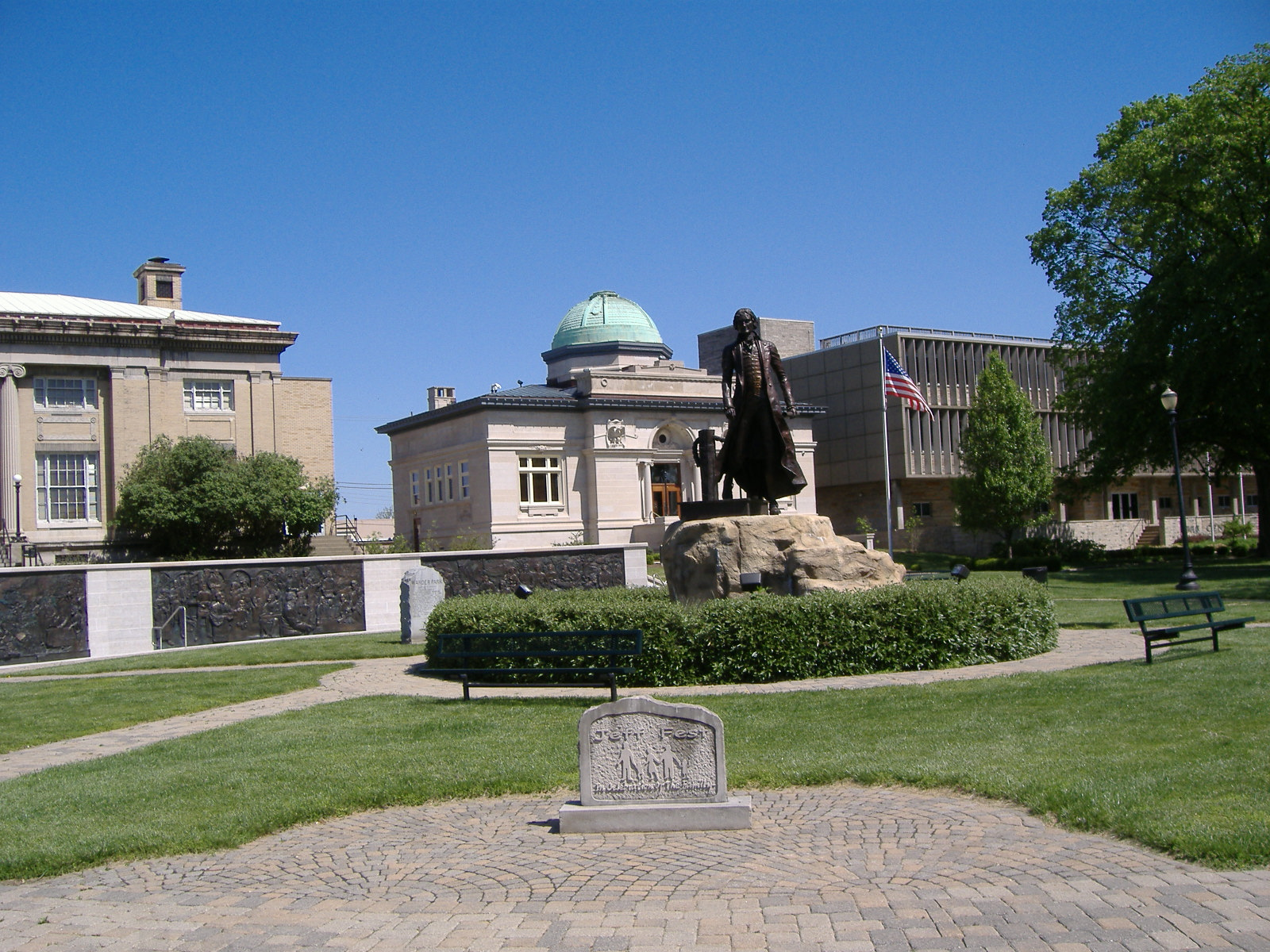
Warder Park

Maple Street features more commercial enterprises than the previous southwest–northeast streets. The 100 block of West Maple Street is dominated by parking lots and a funeral home. The Olde Towne Grocery, originally built in the 1920s as a Krogers and later an A&P, and a collectibles store named Hockeyman's are located across from each other on the 100 block of East Maple. The 200 block of East Maple Street is mostly residential, with four large Victorian homes and a large office building used by the Indiana Bell Telephone Company. The 300–800 blocks of East Maple are residential and are mostly American Four-Square in construction. The blocks also contain a few Gothic-Revival churches,

The northernmost street is Court Avenue, sections of which are part of the historic district and others, having seen new construction, are not part of the district; only the 100 West, 100 East, and 700–900 East Blocks of Court Avenue are in the district. This allows for Warder Park and eastern residential areas, but not the current Jeffersonville Township Public Library and the Clark County Courthouse. This was the site of the Falls City Area Center, a community college that eventually moved to New Albany and became Indiana University Southeast. Warder Park was also the site of an important Civil War bakery, which furnished hardtack for thousands of Union soldiers.

== Gallery ==
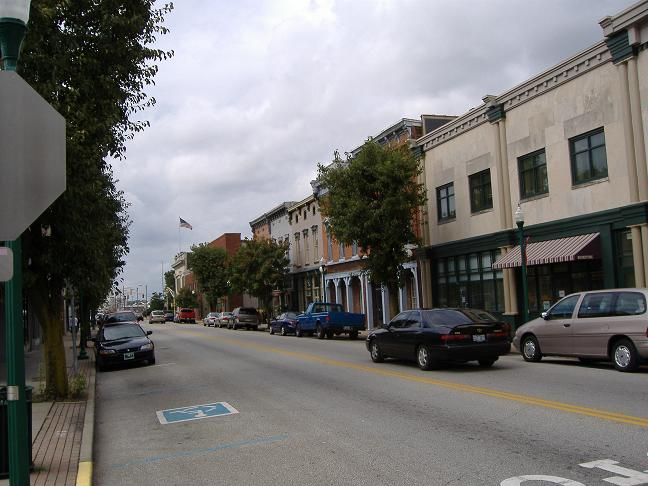
Spring Street of the Historic District

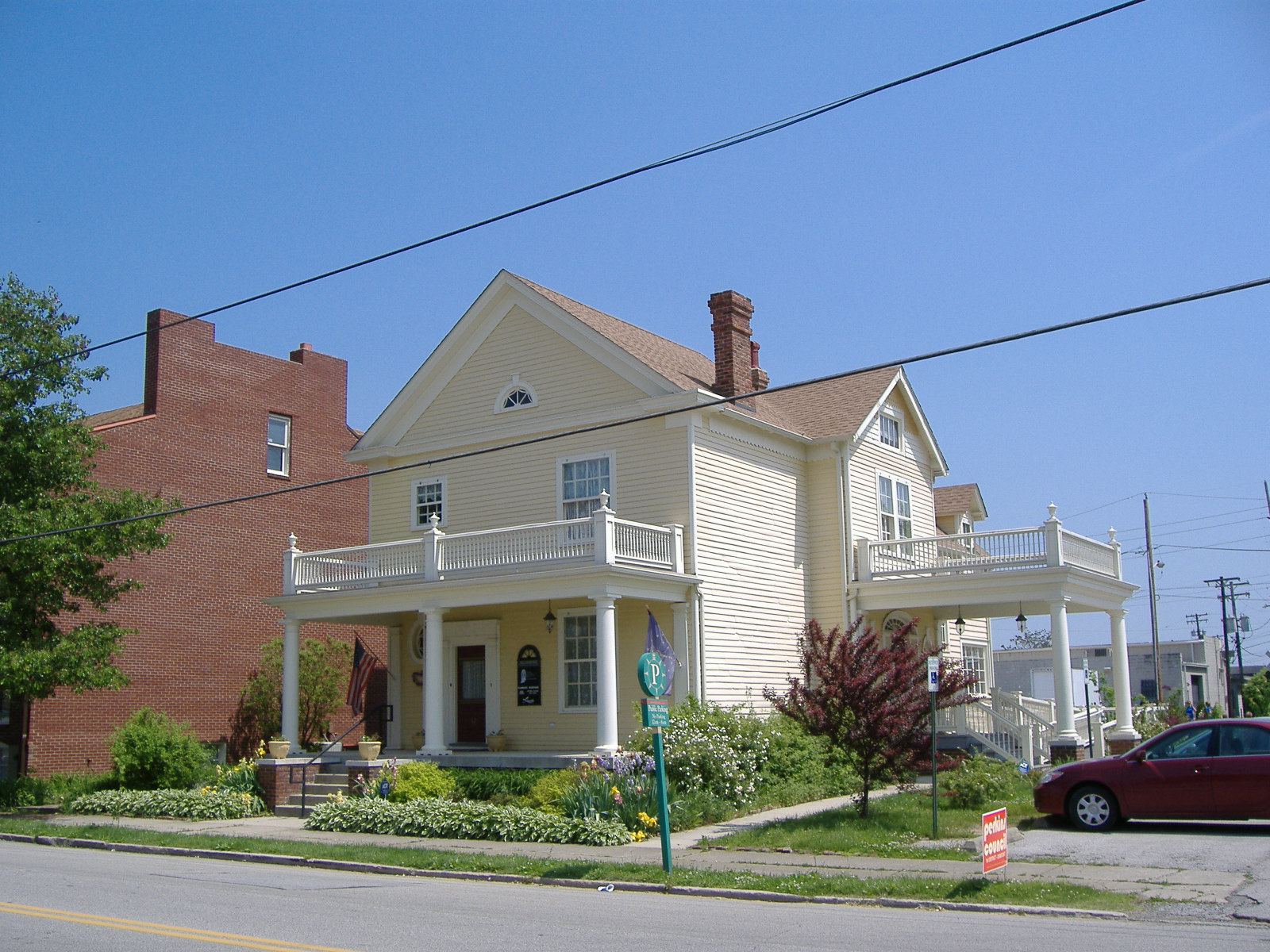
Willey-Allhands House

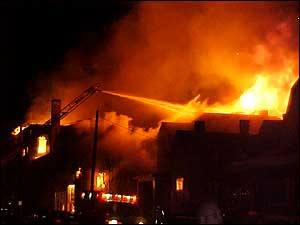
Fire in 2004 that destroyed Horner's

== See also ==
- List of attractions and events in the Louisville metropolitan area
- New Albany Downtown Historic District
- Old Clarksville Site
