= Prince Madoc =

Prince Madoc may refer to:

- Madoc, legendary Welsh explorer
- Madog ap Llywelyn, Welsh rebel
