= Rose Island (amusement park) =

Former American amusement park in Indiana

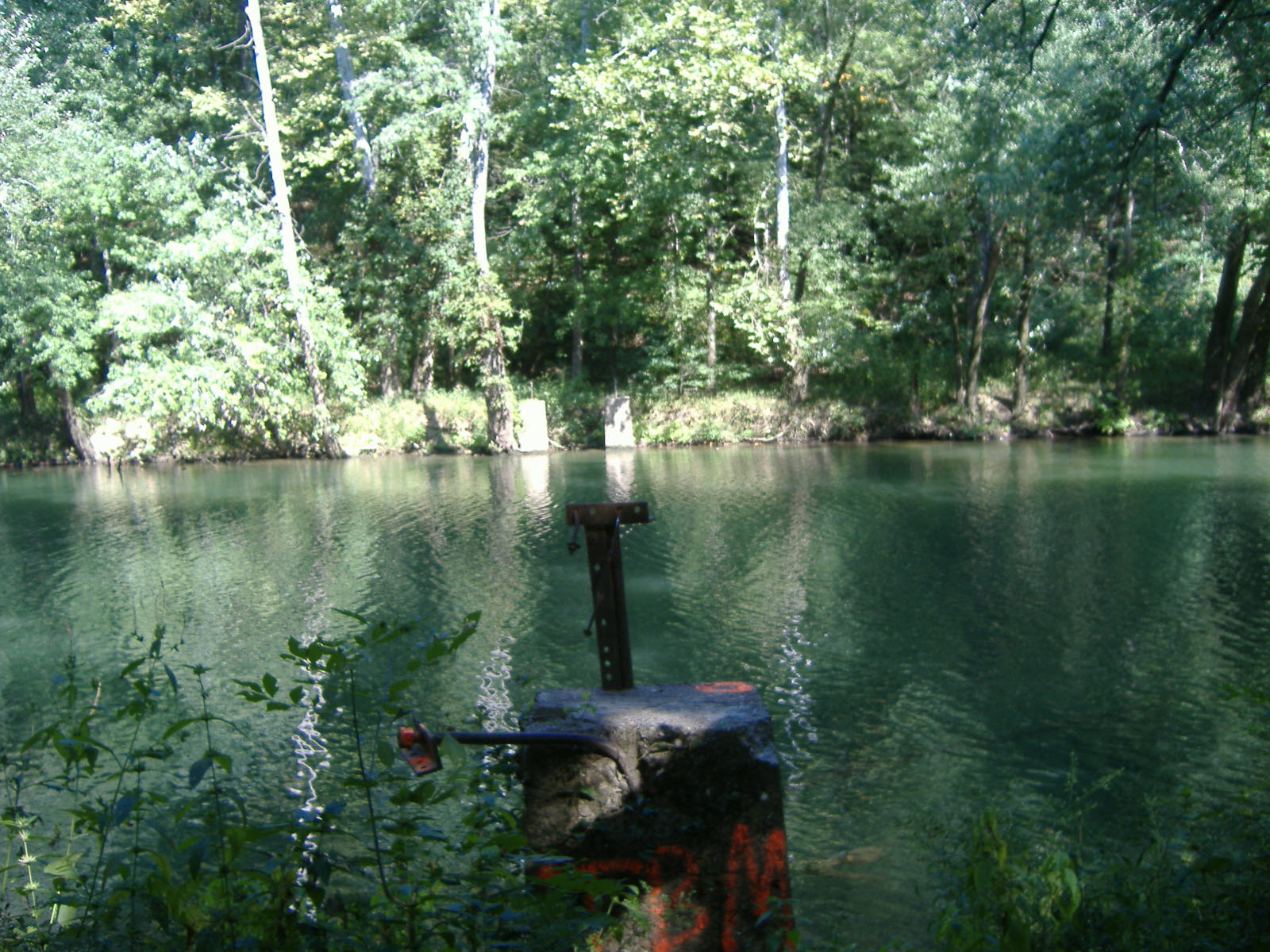
- Site of suspension bridge to Rose Island
- Interactive map of Rose Island
- Location: Charlestown, Indiana, U.S.
- Coordinates: 38.430026°N 85.617185°W
- Status: Defunct
- Opened: 1923
- Closed: 1937
- Owner: E.B. Rose

Attractions
- Total: 2
- Roller coasters: 1

Rose Island is an abandoned amusement park near Charlestown, Indiana, situated on a peninsula (the "Devil's Backbone") created by Fourteen Mile Creek emptying into the Ohio River. It was a recreational area known as Fern Grove in the 1880s, mostly used as a church camp. It was so named due to the many ferns that grew there. The Louisville and Jeffersonville Ferry Company acquired it and developed it in order to increase the use of its ferry business. As Fern Grove it thrived on church picnics and family outings.

The Great Depression hurt business, but its closure was due to damage caused by the 1937 Flood. Ten feet of water covered the park, and the damage was too much in order to rebuild for the 1937 season. Trees have fallen on the bridge and have destroyed all but the supports. Although covered with ivy, the swimming pool was still in excellent condition as late as 1980. Most of the buildings have left no trace, although a few brick formations remain.

== Heyday ==
In 1923 David Rose purchased the property, added an amusement park, hotel, and swimming pool, spending $250,000 in the process, and renamed it Rose Island. It included a wooden coaster, termed a racing derby and named the Devil's Backbone in honor of the rock formation, and a Ferris wheel. There were wolves in a pen, monkeys in a cage, and a black bear named Teddy Roosevelt. There was also a combined dance hall/roller skating rink. In total, the park was 118 acres (0.48 km^{2}). To access it, people either took a steamboat or they drove to a footbridge. One of the steamboats was called Idlewild, which would later become the Belle of Louisville. Others were the America, City of Cincinnati, and the Columbia. A steam ride from Louisville to Rose Island would take 90 minutes-120 minutes, due to the steamboats only going 7–8 miles per hour. There were also speedboats, such as the Vivianne III, that could quickly take businessmen back to Louisville. A ticket to ride the steamboat from Madison was 50 cents. The footbridge was a wooden swinging bridge 50 feet (15 m) above the creek and easily swayed.

== Today ==
Rose Island became part of the Indiana Army Ammunition Plant. When the plant was deactivated, the land was given to the new Charlestown State Park. There was no land access to the area where Rose Island was located, but the concrete pilings of the footbridge connecting the peninsula to the mainland remain and can be seen from one of the park's hiking trails. The state of Indiana has completed a bridge to the Rose Island area for state park visitors. Access to the bridge is provided through Trail 3. The area is also accessible by boat.

In September 2011, the historic Portersville Bridge was relocated and reconstructed to cross the creek and connect the island for the first time.

== Gallery ==
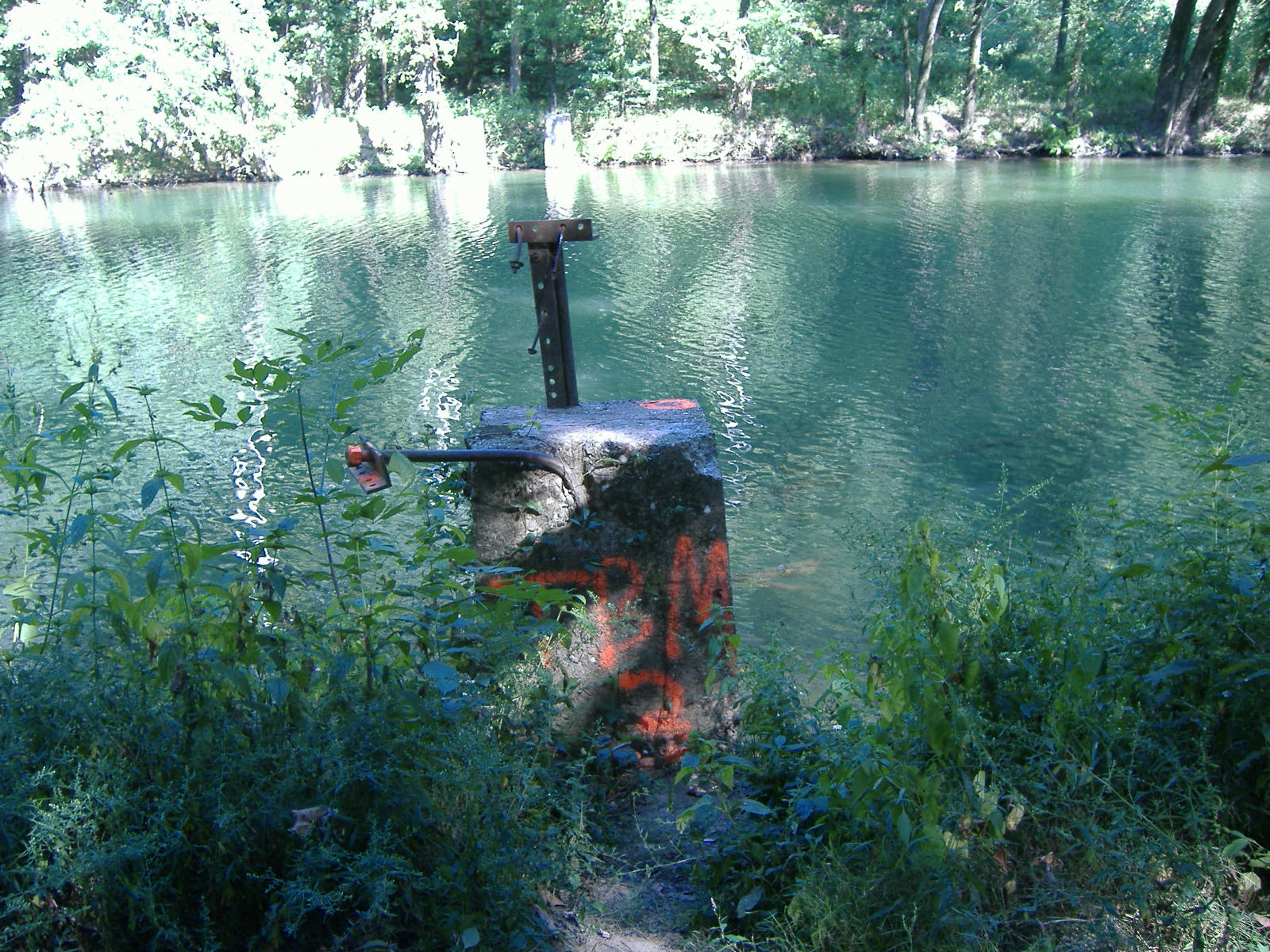
Pylon that once supported the bridge to Rose Island

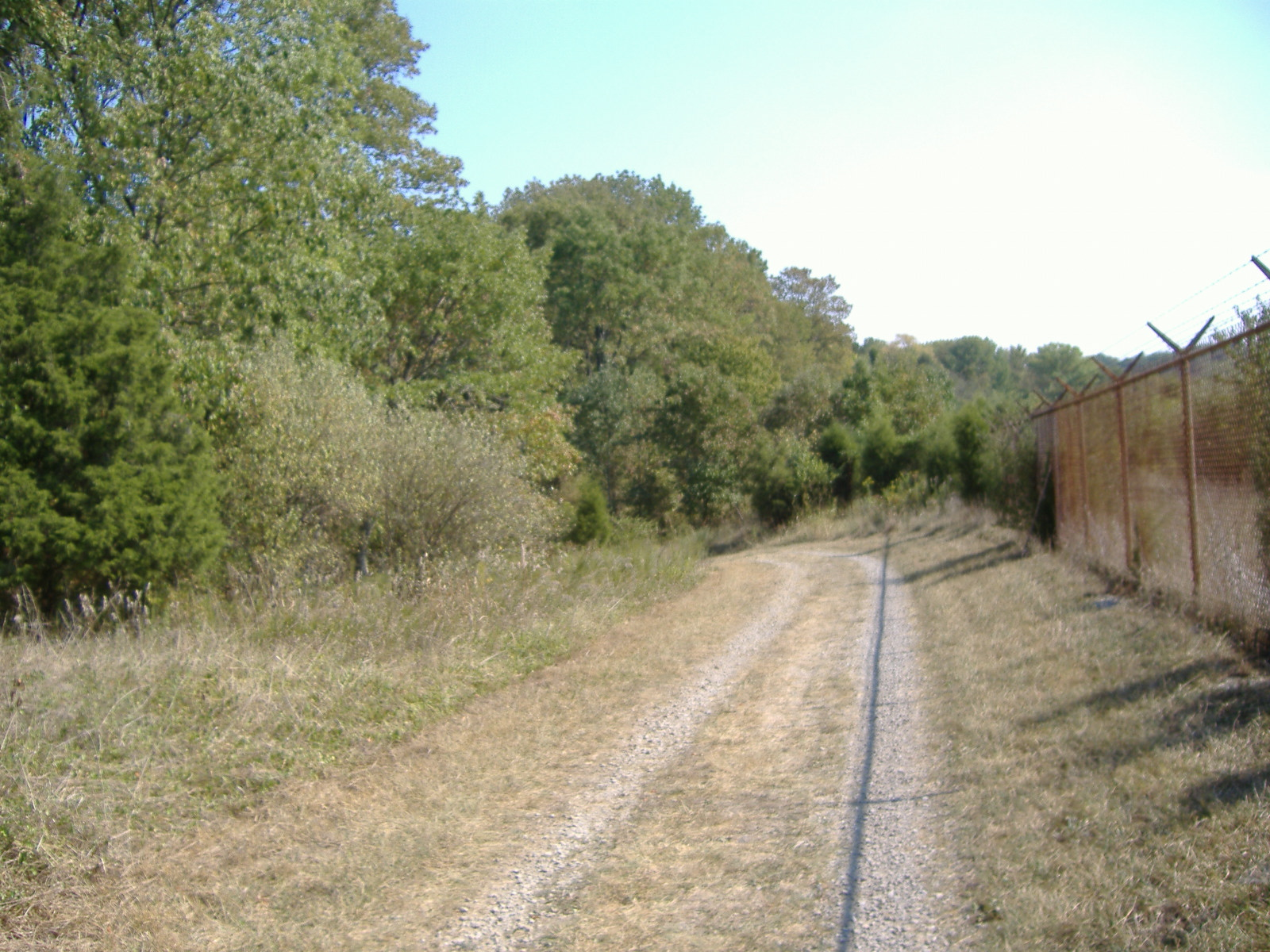
Remains of road leading to Rose Island

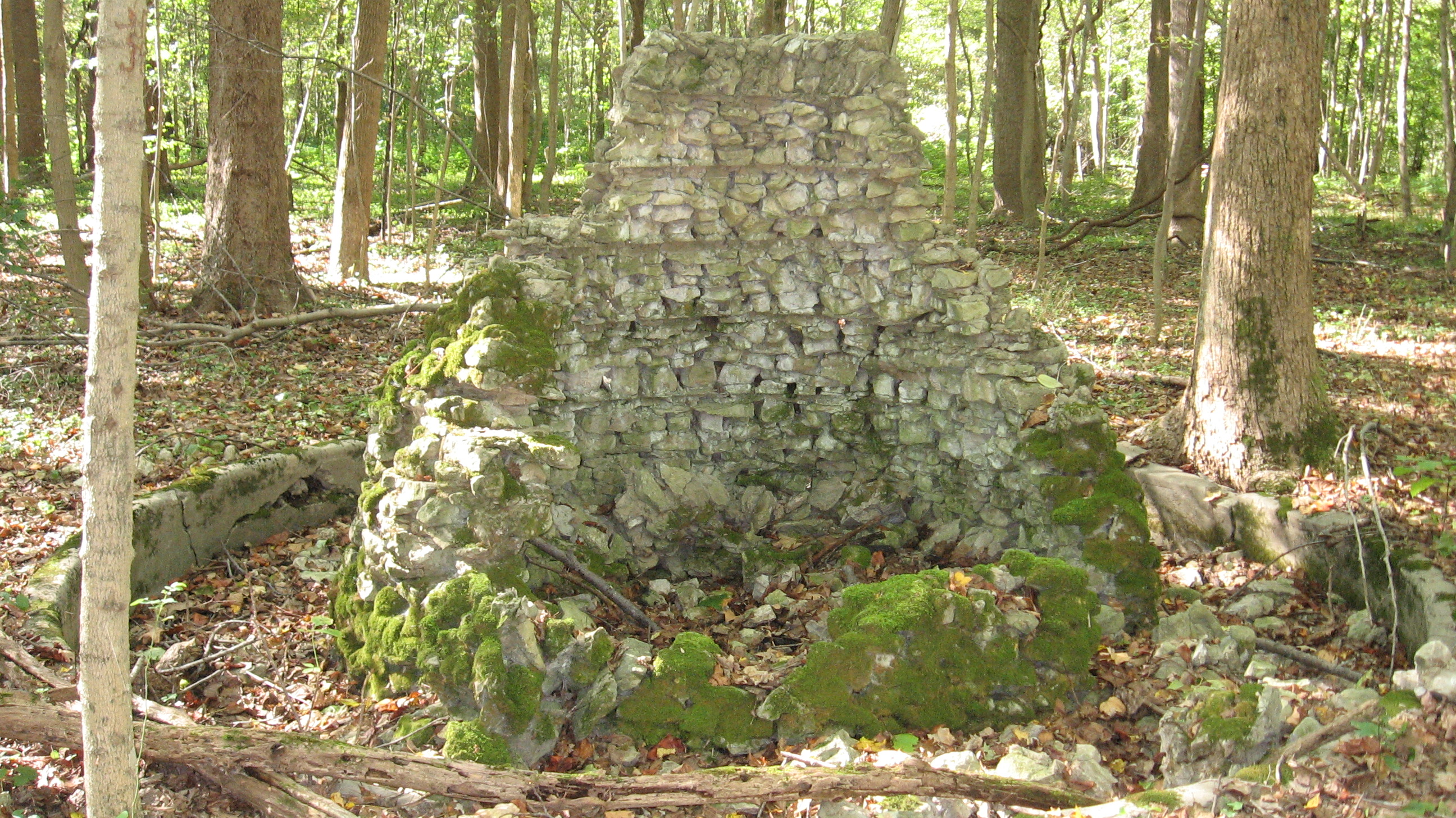
Remains of the Rose Island fountain

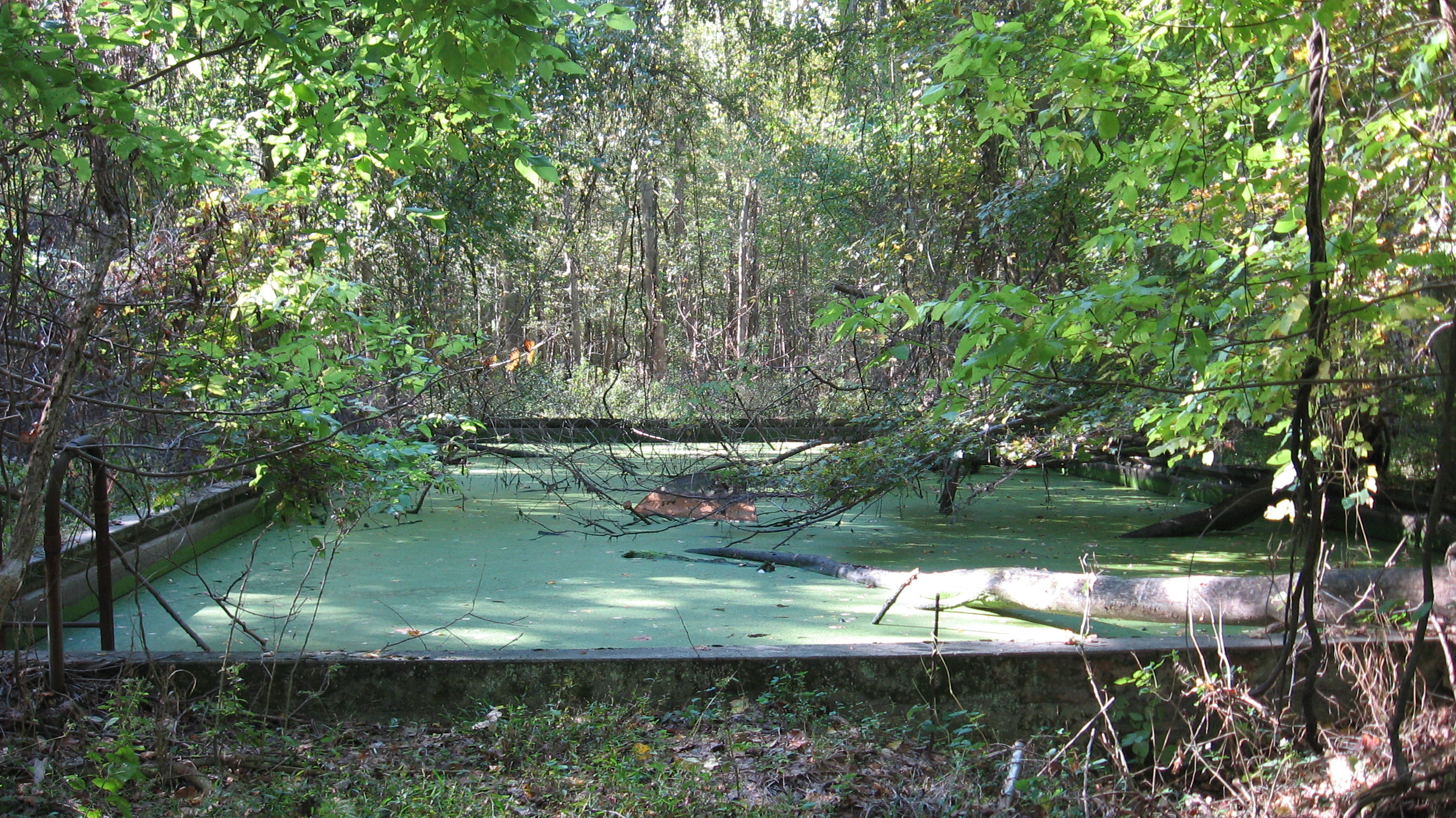
The old swimming pool has been filled in and there is gravel rock on top.

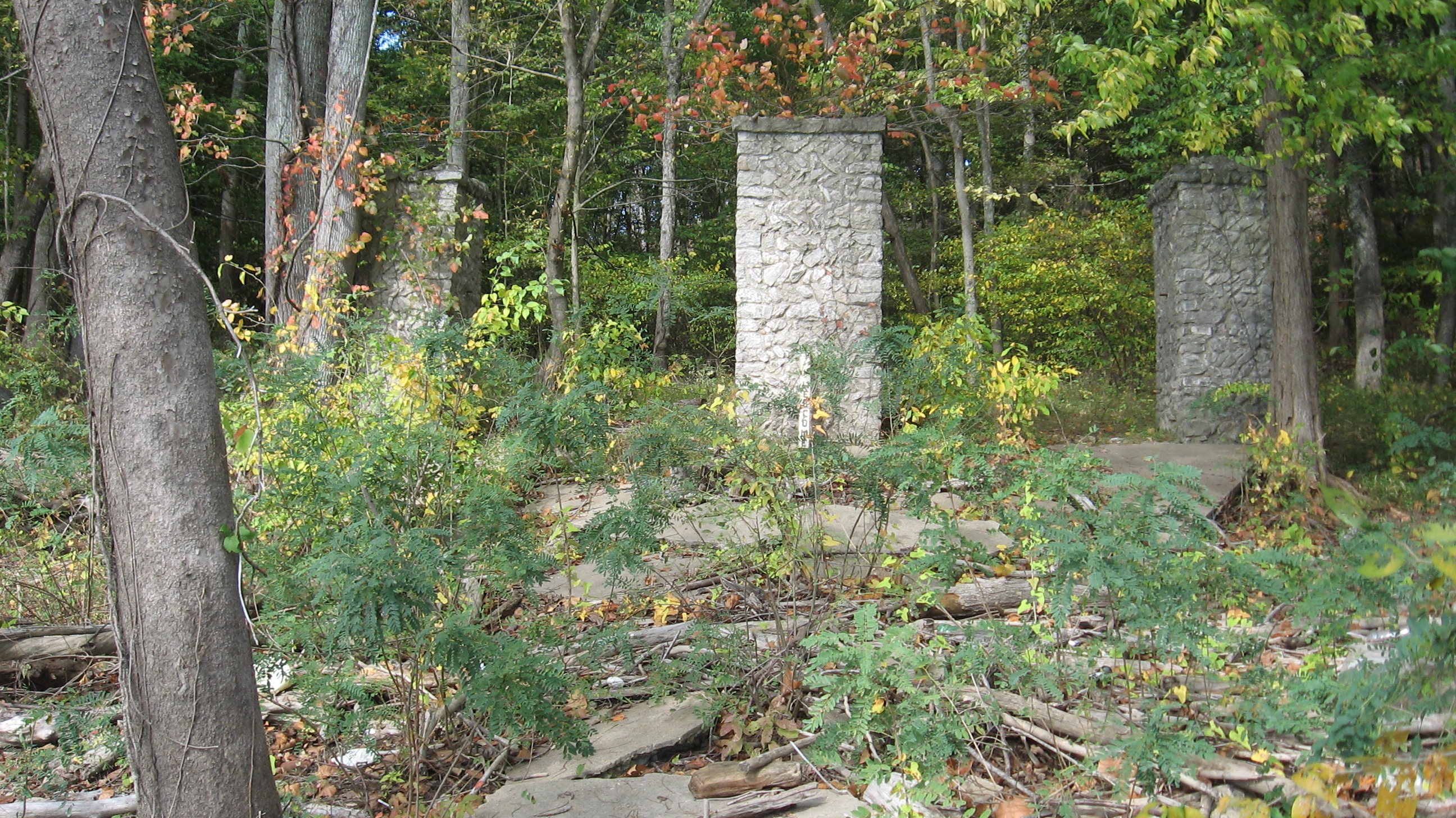
Three pillars of the entryway still remain

== See also ==
- Fontaine Ferry Park
- History of Louisville, Kentucky
- List of attractions and events in the Louisville metropolitan area
