= Fourteen Mile Creek =

Coordinates: 38.42340°N 85.62080°W

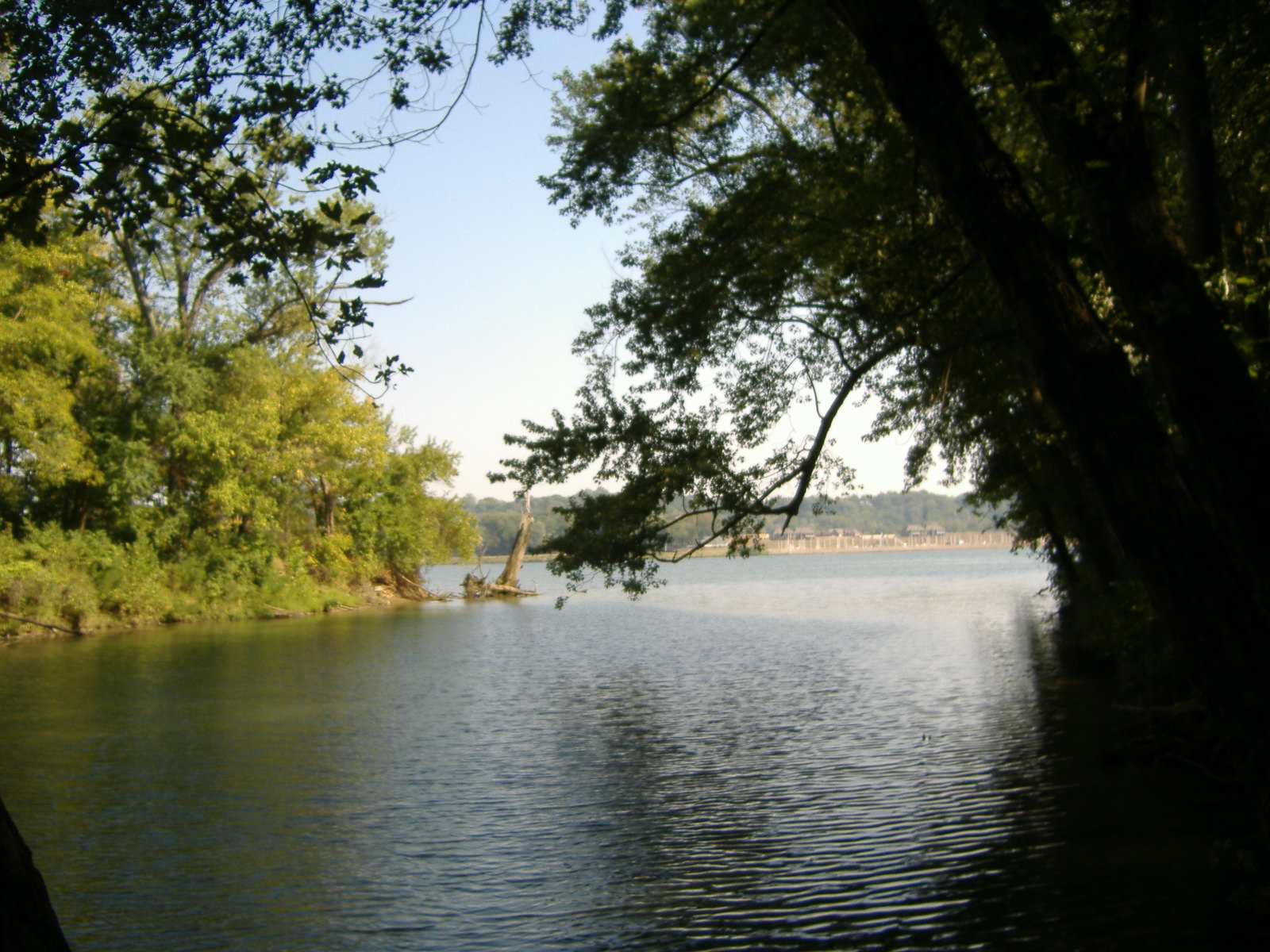
Mouth of the Creek

Fourteen Mile Creek, shown as Fourteenmile Creek on federal maps, is a 22.7-mile-long (36.5 km) creek in Clark County, Indiana, close to Charlestown. It is so named because its mouth on the Ohio River is 14 miles (23 km) upstream from the Falls of the Ohio; similar to how Eighteen Mile Island, Twelve Mile Island, and Six Mile Island got their names. It is navigable for 2.9 miles (4.7 km) from the Ohio River. It is a State Heritage Program Site and a popular canoe trail.

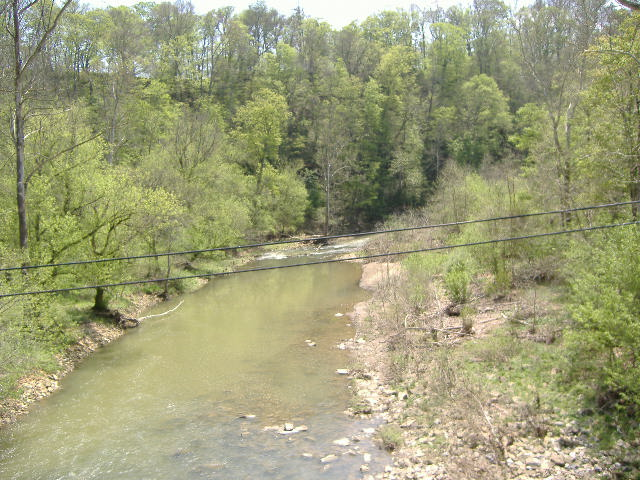
Downstream from the bridge of Tunnel Mill Road

The creek was formed when glaciated water flowed through the unglaciated stream valley that is now the creek. It is lined by limestone cliffs, and the region is noted for its karst sinkholes, hidden waterfalls, and small caves. Due to the damming of the Ohio River, much of the creek is of the same elevation as the river. In fact, the creek sometimes appears to be flowing upstream when in fact rising waters from the Ohio push into the creek. Further upstream from the river, the creek is sometimes only a foot or two deep, which is why historically mills that used the creek had to use dams to keep a constant flow to run them. Bass, bluegill and catfish are the most common fish on the creek.

The creek has seen much history. It is known that the Talligewi Indian tribe resided here. Many local mills used Fourteen Mile Creek for power, most especially Tunnel Mill. The popular Rose Island amusement park was situated where the creek and the Ohio River meet.

During the time that the Indiana Army Ammunition Plant was in operation, the discharge of the Black Power Plant was treated by either a Sanitary Waste Treatment (SWT) plant or on Industrial Waste Treatment (IWT) Plant. Treated discharge from these plants, meeting all state and federal regulations and requirements, went into the Creek. Since the plant's demise, this is no longer a concern.

== Gallery ==
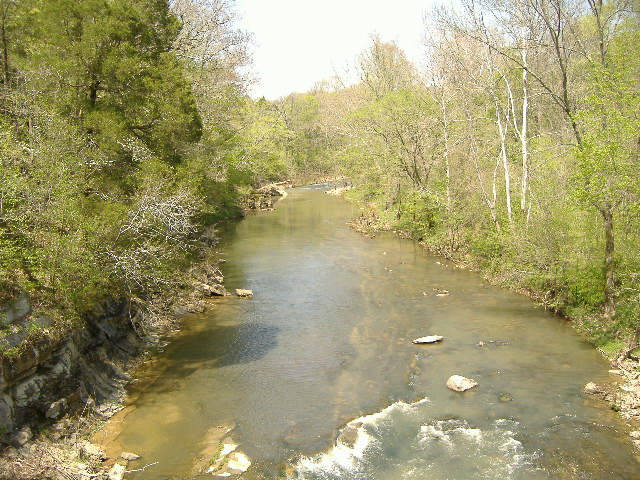
Upstream from the bridge of Tunnel Mill Road

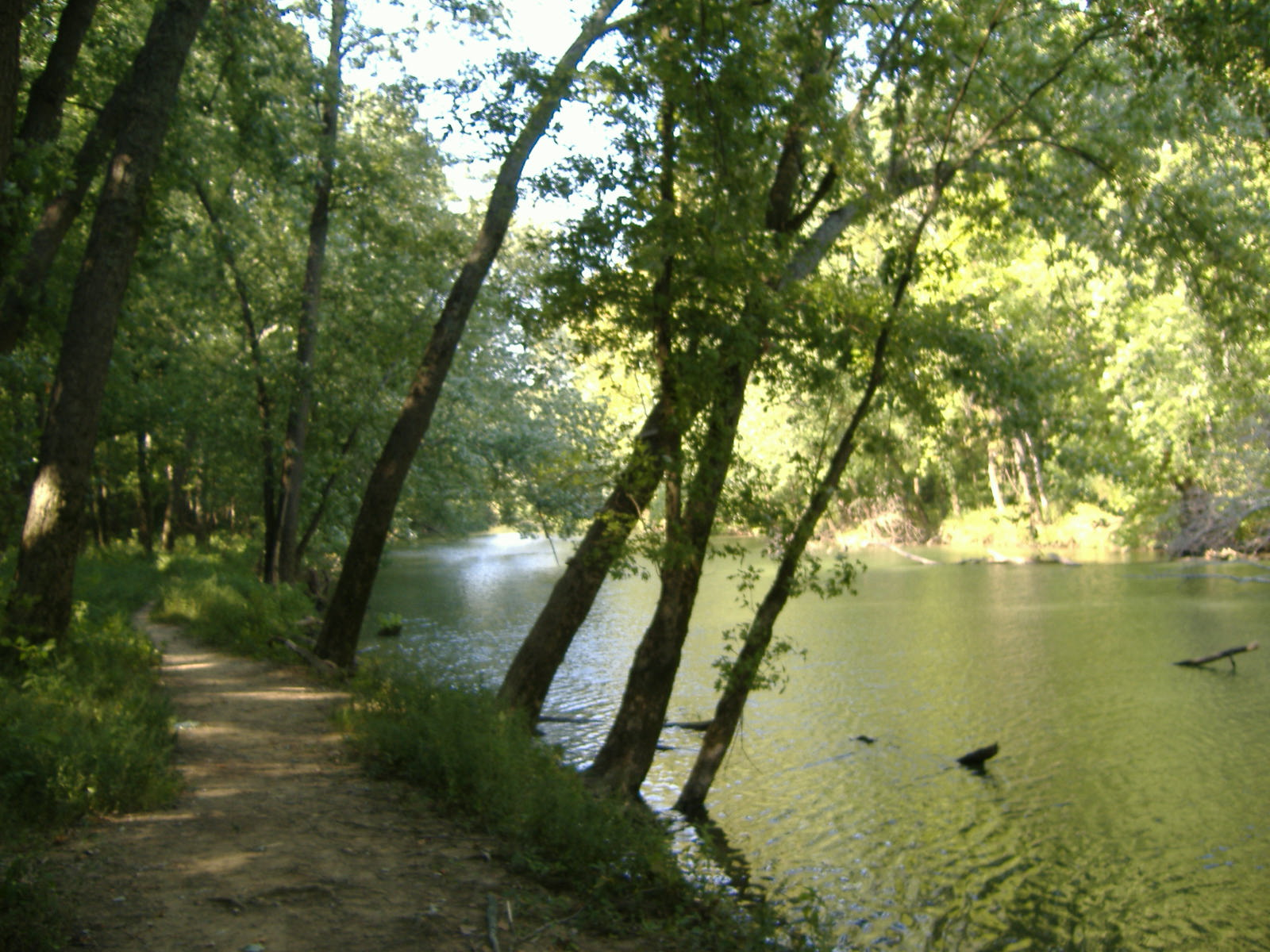
Upstream from the mouth

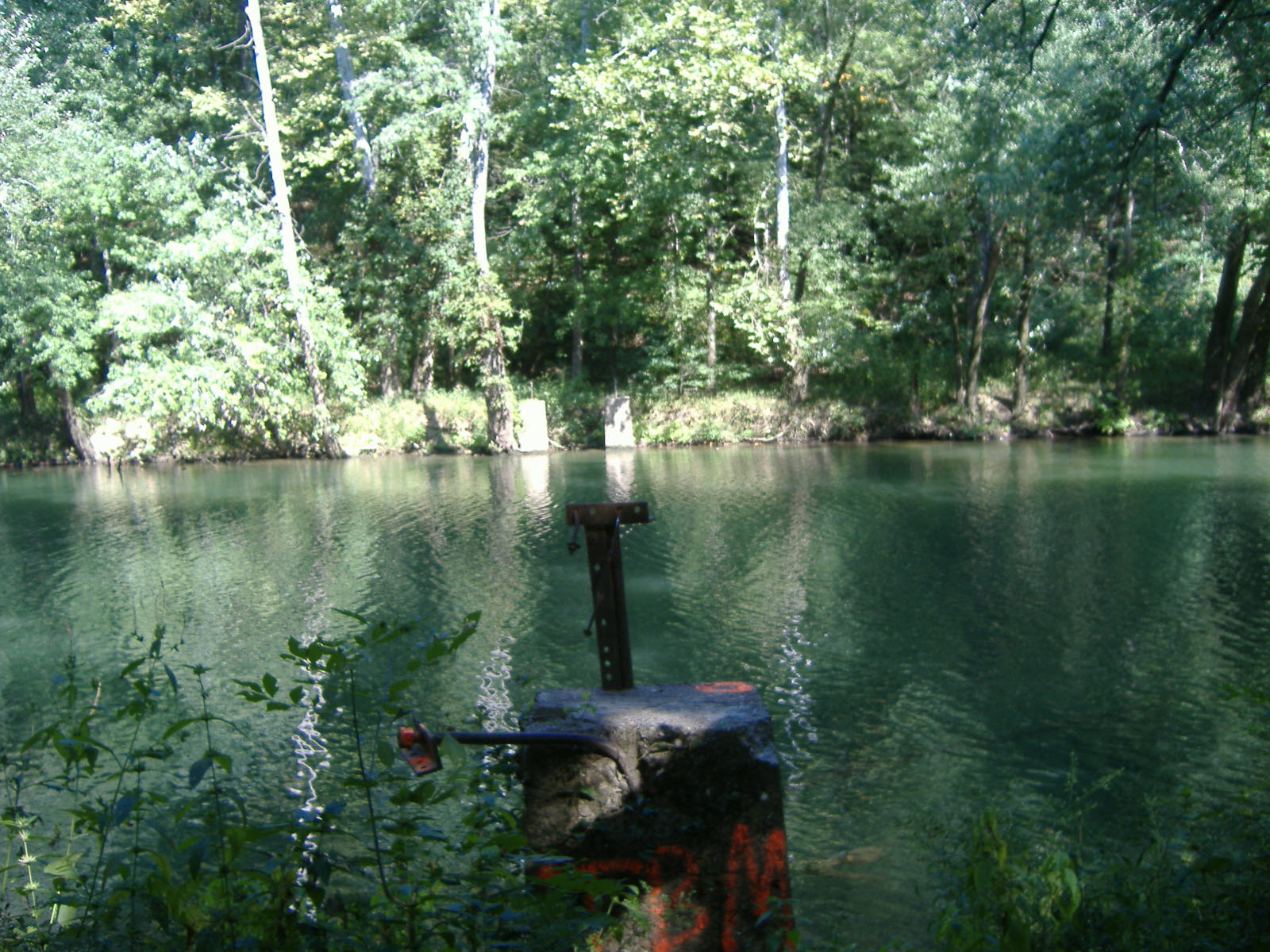
Remains of the Rose Island suspension bridge

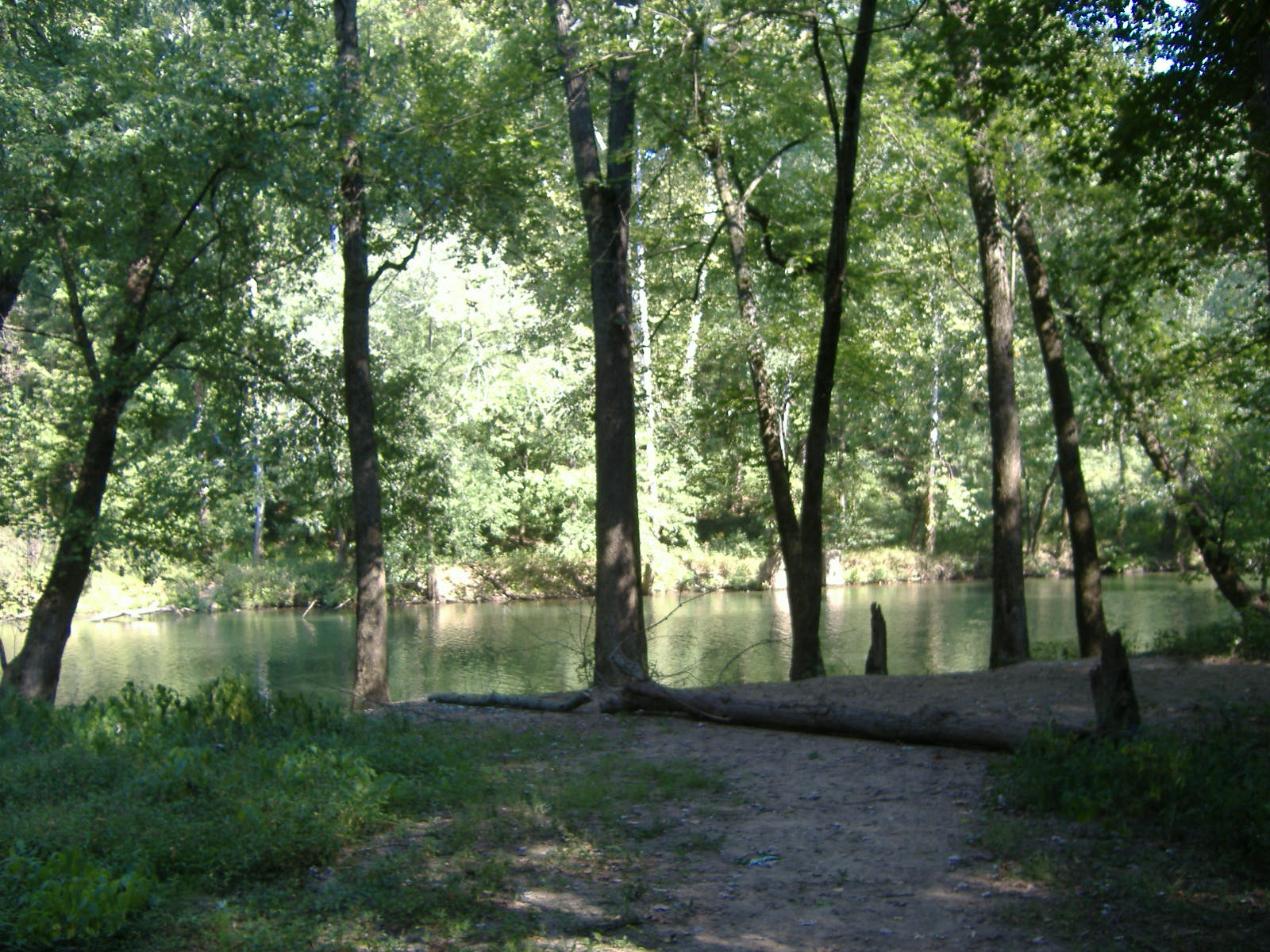
Waterfront along Charlestown State Park

== See also ==
- List of rivers of Indiana
- Devil's Backbone (rock formation)
- Geography of Louisville, Kentucky
