= Madoc (poem) =

1805 poem by Robert Southey

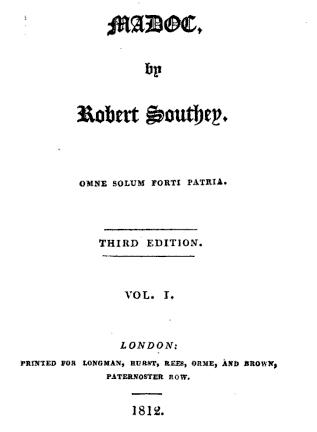
Title page of the third edition, 1812

Madoc is an 1805 epic poem composed by Robert Southey. It is based on the legend of Madoc, a supposed Welsh prince who fled internecine conflict and sailed to America in the 12th century. The origins of the poem can be traced to Southey's schoolboy days when he completed a prose version of Madoc's story. By the time Southey was in his twenties, he began to devote himself to working on the poem in hopes that he could sell it to raise money to fulfill his ambitions to start a new life in America, where he hoped to found Utopian commune or "Pantisocracy". Southey finally completed the poem as a whole in 1799, at the age of 25. However, he began to devote his efforts into extensively editing the work, and Madoc was not ready for publication until 1805. It was finally published in two volumes by the London publisher Longman with extensive footnotes.

The first half of the poem, Madoc in Wales, describes Madoc, a young Welsh nobleman, whose family breaks down into a series of bloody disputes over royal succession. Madoc, unwilling to participate in the struggle, decides to journey to America to start a new life. When he reaches America, he is witness to the bloody human sacrifices that the Aztec nation demands of the surrounding tribes in Aztlan. Madoc, believing it is a defiance against God, leads the Hoamen, a local tribe, into warfare against the Aztecs. Eventually, Madoc conquers them and he is able to convert the Americans to Christianity before returning to Wales to find more recruits for his colony. In the second part, Madoc in Aztlan, Madoc returns to find that the Aztecs have returned to their human sacrifices. After long and bloody warfare, Madoc is able to defeat the Aztecs and force them out of their homeland and into exile.

The poem contains Southey's bias against superstition, whether Catholic, Protestant, or pagan. He believed that the work itself was more historical than epic, and it contained many of Southey's political views. Critics gave the work mixed reviews, with many saying that there were beautiful scenes, but many feeling that the language fell short of being adequate for the subject matter. One review went so far to mock Southey's reliance on Welsh and Aztec names.

== Background ==
The basis for Southey wishing to write an epic poem came from his private reading of literature while attending Westminster School as a boy. In particular, the subject was suggested by a school friend that claimed to be a descendant of Madoc's brother, Rhodri, and Southey began to write a prose version of the story in 1789. In 1794, the 20-year-old Southey was attempting to publish works to raise money to support himself and Samuel Taylor Coleridge in an expedition to America to establish a Pantisocracy, a democratic form of government that the two invented. One of the poems he sought to publish was Madoc, which was an epic that he started working on while at school but he never finished. Southey and Coleridge were able to complete the poem Joan of Arc by summer 1795 while Southey worked on Madoc. However, in his notebook he claimed on 22 February 1797. "This morning I began the study of law, this evening I began Madoc." During 1797, Southey had given up his ideas of Pantisocracy and was studying to become a lawyer. He spent the rest of his time working on other publications, such as a translating part of Jacques Necker's On the French Revolution. Southey continued to work on Madoc through 1798, and started his mornings by working on the poem.

It was not until mid-1799 that Southey was able to finish composing Madoc, and soon after began to work on Thalaba. Afterwards he travelled to Portugal, where he continued to work on Madoc for two more years to polish up the language. After Portugal went to war with France and Spain, Southey returned to England. While there, he travelled to Wales to get more information for his epic. He continued to travel in 1801, and worked on the epic during this time. In May 1804, Southey took the beginning of the poem to the publisher Longman, and he began to finish the second section in October. It was finished and published in two parts early in 1805, with footnotes and a preface explaining Southey's purpose. The work cost a lot of money to publish, which prompted Southey to write "By its high price, one half the edition is condemned to be furniture in expensive libraries, and the other to collect cobwebs in the publisher's warehouses. I foresee that I shall get no solid pudding by it".

== Poem ==
=== Part one: Madoc in Wales ===
Southey intended Madoc to be a combination of the Bible, the works of Homer, and James Macpherson's Ossian poems. The story deals with Madoc, a legendary Welsh prince who supposedly colonised the Americas in the 12th century. The book is divided into two parts, which represent a reversed division between the Iliad and the Odyssey. The work focuses on colonisation, but starts in Wales during King Henry II's reign of England. This section is loosely based on the historical events following the death of Owain Gwynedd, supposedly Madoc's father, in the late 12th century. The work begins as "Owen Gwynned" is crowned king of North Wales after removing his nephew Cynetha from power. After Gwynned dies, one of his sons, David, takes the throne after killing or exiling his siblings. The youngest sibling, Madoc, leaves Britain to settle in a new land. He joins with Cadwallon, the son of Cynetha, and other Welshmen to start their journey. After discovering America, they return to recruit people to help form a new colony. Madoc stays long enough to witness fighting between his living siblings and determines that he must leave immediately.

The story follows Madoc's journey as they travel West again, contending with problems such as storms and dissent among the crew. Eventually, they reach America and are received by the natives. Madoc takes on one of the natives, Lincoya, as his guide when they begin to explore the area of the Mississippi River. As they continue to travel, they soon come to Aztlan, the original homeland of the Aztec nation, and Madoc discovers that the Aztecs require human sacrifices for their gods. Madoc decides to interfere with tribal affairs and stop two children from being taken by the Aztecs to be sacrificed. Following this, he encourages a peaceful tribe, the Hoamen, to take up arms against the Aztecs. To further protect the Hoamen, Madoc goes to the Aztec capital to deal with their king. While there, he is shown by the king how great the Aztecs are and how no one could stand against them. Madoc witnesses among the buildings and monuments piles of skulls and corpses along with other horrific scenes.

Unwilling to allow the Aztecs to continue their practices, Madoc instigates war between the Aztecs and the much smaller Hoamen nation. While the Aztecs bring a large army, Madoc is able to use Welsh technology and superior tactics to overcome them. The Hoamen are able to take many prisoners while the Aztec king contracts a mortal illness. Following the battle Madoc shocks the Aztecs by releasing the prisoners instead of sacrificing them, and provides leeches to help the Aztec king recover from his disease. This leads to a treaty between the Aztecs and the Hoamen which abolishes human sacrifice. The Aztec priests fear to stop the practice, so the Aztec king decides that his people will abandon their religion and take up a monotheistic religion based on a God of love.

The rest of the story involves Madoc returning to Wales to recruit more settlers for his colony. During this time, he meets with Owen Cyveilioc, a poet who tells Madoc to discuss the matter with the Congress of Bards. During the meeting, a young bard prophesies that Madoc would be like Merlin in America and that he is trying to recreate an Arthurian greatness. Afterward, he meets with Llewelyn, an individual trying to reclaim his title as Prince of Wales. Madoc tries and fails to convince him to come to America. Madoc returns to his original home, and there he stops an attempt to remove the body of Gwynned from a grave on holy ground. Instead, Madoc offers to take the corpse back with him to America where it could be buried without any worry. The rest of Madoc's time back in Wales is spent trying to get his brother David, the king, to free another brother, Rodri, whom he has imprisoned. However, Rodri escapes after his release was promised. As Madoc sets out to return to the colony, they are met by Rodri's boat. Rodri informs Madoc that he is working with Llewelyn to overthrow David and restore the rightful king. Although Madoc is upset by the potential warfare, he leaves with the promise by Llewlyn that Britain will be fine.

=== Part two: Madoc in Aztlan ===
The second part of the poem parallels the Iliad and follows the events in America after the first part. Madoc returns to America from Wales and finds that Caermadoc, the colony, is doing well. However, there are struggles with his people and the Aztecs because the Aztecs have turned back to their pagan gods. As such, the peace between the two groups ends while a shaman of the Hoamen people starts to convince the people to also worship pagan gods. The Hoamen begin to sacrifice children for their god by feeding them to a large snake. Madoc, angry, accuses a priest leading the sacrifices of being a traitor before killing both the priest and the snake. This feat brings the Hoamen back to Christianity.

The Aztec high priest, Tezozomoc, tells the people that they will not have the favour of their gods unless they kill the foreigners. Two warriors volunteer to capture a child to please their gods, and they return with Madoc and the child Hoel. Madoc is forced to fight other condemned men, until Madoc's Welsh allies attack the city, allowing a woman, Coatel, to free Madoc and Hoel. At the same time the Aztec warrior Amalahta attacks Caermadoc, but is defeated by the Welsh women. When Madoc returns, he joins the Welsh and Hoamen forces, and the battle continues until Madoc kills the Aztec king, Coanocotzin.

The battle is followed by the Welshmen destroying the pagan temples while the Aztecs gather to appoint a new king. Games and events are established and follow after the battle. During the various events, a temple becomes covered in flames and idols to the pagan gods appear once again. This is followed by the Aztecs telling the Welsh to leave before attacking them. A battle takes place in the water surrounding the Aztec city on boats, and the superior Welsh ships are able to win. The Aztecs, unwilling to stop, turn to superstitious rituals and priests travel to a sacred mountain to make sacrifices. However, a sudden lava eruption kills the priests. This causes the Aztecs to believe that they do not have the support of their gods and they cease their fighting. Admitting defeat, the Aztecs leave the area and head south for Mexico.

== Themes ==
During his time in Portugal, Southey cultivated a strong anti-Catholic bias, and saw Catholic rituals as superstitious and pagan-like. However, he did not limit his feelings to only Catholics, and he believed that Methodists and Calvinists were also superstitious and a political threat. He distrusted religious enthusiasm and any alteration of the mind away from reason. Southey wrote that Madoc, in following these beliefs, was about a "gentle tribe of savages delivered from priestcraft." With such an intent, Southey also believed that he was dealing closely with history and scholarship. The footnotes within Madoc reinforce such an intent. He did not call it an epic like some of his other works. Instead, he argued that there was evidence that the story had a historical basis. The story, according to Southey, was that Madoc came from Britain to America to replace paganism with Christianity.

In terms of politics, Southey believed that war with the post-revolution France was inappropriate when he first started composing Madoc. By the time the poem was finished, Southey was an advocate for a war against Napoleon's government. Instead of supporting his own government in return, he was opposed to the government of Prime Minister William Pitt the Younger. The poem is also heavily grounded in Southey's ideas on Pantisocracy, and it includes an earlier version of his democratic ideal within a mythic form. The connection between Wales and America within the poem alludes to Southey's own plans to travel from Wales to settle in America to start a new societal system.

The endings of the two poems are the same but have opposite results: they both have a sunset and an exodus from the country, but the first deals with Wales and the second with the Aztec lands. The first is messianic and heralds a return of Wales's greatness, and the second deals with a new country being created.

== Reception ==
Southey intended Madoc to rival the works of Homer, and Coleridge believed that the poem would be better than the Aeneid. However, Madoc received mixed reviews from critics; while one critic believed it was comparable to John Milton's Paradise Lost, another felt that it was unreadable. In letter written by William Wordsworth on 3 June 1805, he claimed that he was "highly pleased with it; it abounds in beautiful pictures and descriptions happily introduced, and there is an animation diffused through the whole story though it cannot perhaps be said that any of the characters interest you much, except perhaps young Llewllyn whose situation is highly interesting, and he appears to me the best conceived and sustained character in the piece [...] The Poem fails in the highest gifts of the poet's mind Imagination in the true sense of the word, and knowledge of human Nature and the human heart. There is nothing that shows the hand of the great Master". He followed this with a letter on 29 July 1805 saying "Southey's mind does not seem strong enough to draw the picture of a Hero. The character of Madoc is often very insipid and contemptible [...] In short, according to my notion, the character is throughout languidly conceived". Dorothy Wordsworth, William's sister, wrote on 11 June 1805 to claim that "We have read Madoc with great delight [...] I had one painful feeling throughout, that I did not care as much about Madoc as the Author wished me to do, and that the characters in general are not sufficiently distinct to make them have a separate after-existence in my affections."

A review by John Ferriar in the October 1805 Monthly Review argued, "It has fallen to the lot of this writer to puzzle our critical discernment more than once [...] He has now contrived to manufacture a large quarto, which he has styled a poem, but of what description it is no easy matter to decide [...] The poem of Madoc is not didactic, nor elegiac, nor classical, in any respect [...] Respecting the manners, Mr. Southey appears to have been more successful than in his choice of the story. He has adhered to history where he could discover any facts adapted to his purpose; and when history failed him, he has had recourse to probability." Ferriar continued with an attack on the Welsh names that appear within the poem: "we own that the nomenclature of his heroes has shocked what Mr. S. would call our prejudices. Goervyl and Ririd and Rodri and Llaian may have charms for Cambrian ears, but who can feel an interest in Tezozomoc, Tlalala, or Ocelopan [...] how could we swallow Yuhidthiton, Coanocotzin, and, above all, the yawning jaw-dislocating Ayayaca?—These torturing words, particularly the latter, remind us so strongly of the odious cacophony of the Nurse and Child, that they really are not to be tolerated."

An anonymous review in the Imperial Review in November 1805 stated, "something should be said of the language. This undoubtedly is not its chief excellence. The style, in many places, is trailing, flat, and uninteresting,—deficient both in strength and animation. The author seldom avails himself of any artificial ornaments [...] Though we feel ourselves compelled to make these observations, it is hardly necessary to add, that upon the whole we think very highly of this performance." The review continues by comparing Madoc to Paradise Lost: "were the style adorned by a little artificial colouring, and enriched with all the allowable decorations of poetry, Madoc would hardly yield to Paradise Lost. As it stands, it is certainly the second heroic production in the English language. Its leading characteristics are not fire and sublimity, but tenderness and humanity. Milton astonishes the head—Southey touches the heart. The first we may admire—the last we can love."

Jack Simmons, in his 1945 biography, believed that the poem was "the longest, the least successful, the most tedious" of Southey's poems. In 1972, Ernest Bernhardt-Kabisch argued "Southey would perhaps have done well to have ended the poem here [at the end of part one]. In its larger framework of Welsh history, the American adventure and its clash of culture is interesting and is comparable in purpose and proportion, if not in power and dramatic nuance, to Odysses' exotic flashback narrative at the court of Phaeacia. The Welsh narrative [...] appeals to a variety of Romantic interests – patriotic and picturesque, sentimental and libertarian. And though, as always, thought tends to be commonplace and pathos shortwinded, the quality of the writing is almost uniformly high, and there are memorable and moving passages of description and rhetoric, as well as suggestive images". He continued adding that "Southey's epic thereby becomes, in fact, the crowning effort of eighteenth-century English literature to deal poetically with the American Indian".

In 1990 Northern Irish poet Paul Muldoon published his long poem Madoc: a Mystery, inspired by Southey's work and the events surrounding it. Muldoon's work takes as its premise the idea that Southey and Coleridge actually came to America to found their ideal state, and offers a multi-layered poetic exploration of what might have happened. It won the 1992 Geoffrey Faber Memorial Prize.
