= Naval Ordnance Station Louisville =

Naval Ordnance Station Louisville ("NOSL") is a major employer of Louisville, Kentucky, near Muhammad Ali International Airport. For over fifty years, starting in late 1941, it provided maintenance and equipment for the United States Navy. Since the end of the Cold War, Naval Ordnance was the main hub for repair and replacement of major guns and equipment on battleships, along with work for NASA. By the mid-1990s, most of it was turned over to private companies. The complex is currently named the Greater Louisville Technology Park.

== History ==
The area for Naval Ordnance was chosen due to being so far inland, that it would be difficult for enemies to strike it. Construction began on January 29, 1941, ten months prior to the Attack on Pearl Harbor and America's official entry into World War II. It was officially commissioned on October 1, 1941.

During World War II, Westinghouse Electric Corporation held the work contract for the facility, even though it was (and still is) a private company. At its height it would employ 4200 workers at one time. It specialized in torpedo tubes and gun mounts. In February 1946 operational control reverted to the Navy, and the number of workers declined to 500. In 1948 it spiked to 850, and then decreased to only 100 in 1950. The Korean War caused employment at NOSL to increase to 1800.

During the Cold War, it would mostly repair naval equipment, but would also provide general support, research and development of gun weapon systems, and construct ordnance for the Navy. By the 1990s, it was the only facility that the Navy had that could give its surface weapon systems complete engineering, technical support services, and major overhauling. It was the only facility approved to give the Phalanx CIWS engineering and overhauling.

In 1990, NOSL was on a list for base closures, but the Gulf War caused the facility to remain open, hiring 107 permanent workers. Immediately after the conclusion of Operation: Desert Storm, it was decided for NOSL to merge some activities with Indiana's Crane Naval facility, allowing it to remain open. On June 27, 1993, it survived another base-closure movement, despite efforts by a private contractor in Minnesota.

United Defense and Hughes Missile Systems was given control of the facility on August 15, 1996. A collection of private companies, it would serve as a contractor for the Navy. The facility's name officially changed to "Greater Louisville Technology Park", but would continue to be called "Naval Ordnance" by locals. It was the first former military facility to continue to supply contracted military supplies, but at a much reduced rate than it had during the World War II/Cold War era. The workforce in the 1990s started at 1850, but was reduced to 870, which included 200 workers of non-military articles. 500,000 square feet (46,000 m^{2}) of the facility, one-third of its total, was not in use, and much of the rest were burdened by state and local ordinance codes it was previously immune to, as its many 1940s and 1950s buildings could be considered environmental hazards. The name "Naval Surface Warfare Center Port Huemene Division Louisville Detachment" was given to what was left of the official government presence on the site.

In 2005, the United States Department of Defense made plans concerning the facility's function, to either consolidate operations for either the 179th Airlift Wing or the 118th Airlift Wing's C-130Hs. Another plan was to take Louisville's "gun and ammunition Research and Development & Acquisition" to New Jersey, which would cost the Louisville economy up to 506 jobs by 2011. USS Louisville's (CA 28) ship's bell is on display at the Navy Operational Support Center in Louisville, Kentucky.

The facility has had trouble attracting new employers, as the environmental studies each employer would have to pay for before they could start business there makes it unattractive.

== See also ==
- Indiana Army Ammunition Plant
- Jeffersonville Quartermaster Depot
