= Devil's Backbone (rock formation) =

Rock formation near Charlestown, Indiana, U.S

Coordinates: 38.430468°N 85.615571°W

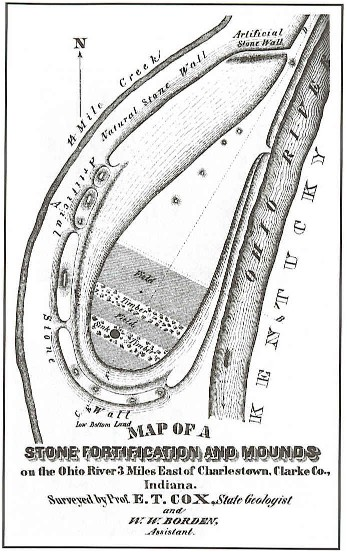
Stone fortification and mounds at the Devil's Backbone rock formation

Devil's Backbone is a rock formation and peninsula formed by the flow of Fourteen Mile Creek into the Ohio River, and is currently situated in Charlestown State Park near Charlestown, Indiana, and across the Ohio River from Louisville, Kentucky. According to local legend, on this bedrock ridge once stood a stone fortress that was built by Welsh explorers led by Prince Madoc sometime in the 12th century.

The Backbone is believed to have been formed by the processes of glaciation where a combination of ice sheet advances, meltwater flows and a diversion of the Ohio River left an isolated bedrock ridge remaining between two valleys.

Rose Island, an amusement park popular during the 1920s that was destroyed by the 1937 Flood, stood on this rugged peninsula, at the base of the ridge on a level area.

Charlestown State Park hiking trails do not provide access to the Backbone, but a loop around the old Rose Island site passes below the ridge.

There is another location by the same name near Fort Ritner, Indiana, east of Bedford.

== See also ==
- Geography of Indiana
- Geography of Louisville, Kentucky
