= Charlestown State Park =

State park in Clark County, Indiana, US

- IUCN category III (natural monument or feature)
- Location within Indiana
- Location: Clark County, Indiana, USA
- Nearest city: Charlestown, Indiana
- Coordinates: 38°25′48″N 85°37′48″W
- Area: 5,100 acres (21 km^{2})
- Established: October 12, 1996
- Visitors: 198,808 (in 2018–2019)
- Governing body: Indiana Department of Natural Resources

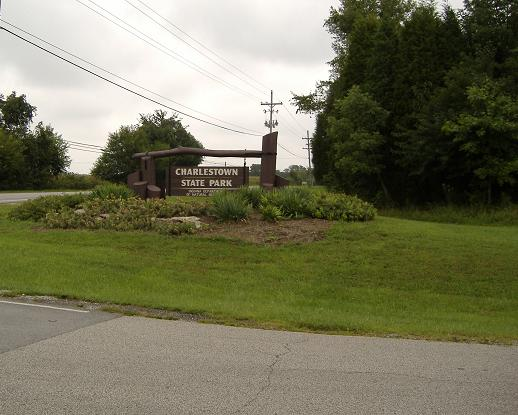
Entrance of Charlestown State Park

Charlestown State Park is an Indiana state park on 5,100 acres (20.64 km^{2}) in Clark County, Indiana, in the United States. The park is on the banks of the Ohio River, 1 mile (2 km) east of Charlestown. It was once part of the Indiana Army Ammunition Plant (INAAP), and was donated in separate parcels to the Indiana state government. In 1993, the state of Indiana was given 859 acres (3.48 km^{2}), and in 1994 was given an additional 1,125 acres (4.55 km^{2}) . When the park opened in 1996, it encompassed 2,400 acres (9.7 km^{2}). With an additional 2,600 acres (10.5 km^{2}) given by the INAAP in 2004, the park has 5,100 acres (20.6 km^{2}), making it the third largest state park in Indiana. The park attracts nearly 200,000 visitors annually.

== Features ==
The main feature of the park is various scenic trails overlooking Fourteen Mile Creek, noted for being one of the oldest unglaciated stream valleys in the state. On the peninsula the creek forms where it meets the Ohio River stands an isolated bedrock ridge called the Devil's Backbone. According to legend, the Devil's Backbone forms part of the remains of an ancient stone fortress built by Welsh adventurers who traveled to the Ohio Valley in the 12th century, though the story is unsubstantiated. The Backbone is restricted, however park staff offer limited tours in the winter. Over 14 miles of hiking trails are available for use, with many great views of the Ohio River, Fourteen Mile Creek and more.

Charlestown State Park has a 192 site campground, including "Full Hook up" campsites.

Devonian fossils and karst sinkholes can be found in the park, in addition to 72 species of birds, including bluebirds, black vultures and bald eagles.

The park was scheduled for $3 million in improvements, which were delayed in January 2006 when workers building a new boat ramp found a Native American cooking area dating back to 2,000 B.C. The remains of firepits and stone slabs that would be used to crack nuts were found, as well as Laurel chert, from which stone tools were made. Only once the archaeological surveys were done could work on the improvements, including a five-lane boat ramp and a riverfront walking trail, continue. In September, 2006 construction of the new boat ramps restarted. The boat ramp opened in June 2007.

In September 2011, the historic Portersville Bridge was relocated and reconstructed to cross the creek and connect Rose Island for the first time. Park Staff offer regular guided tours of Rose Island.

== Future plans ==
There are still railroad tracks and private houses on the property, and the Indiana state government is still deciding what to do with them. Future developments confirmed by the state for the park include more hiking trails, Mountain Bike trails, improvements to the campground, a Nature Center and cabins.

== Gallery ==
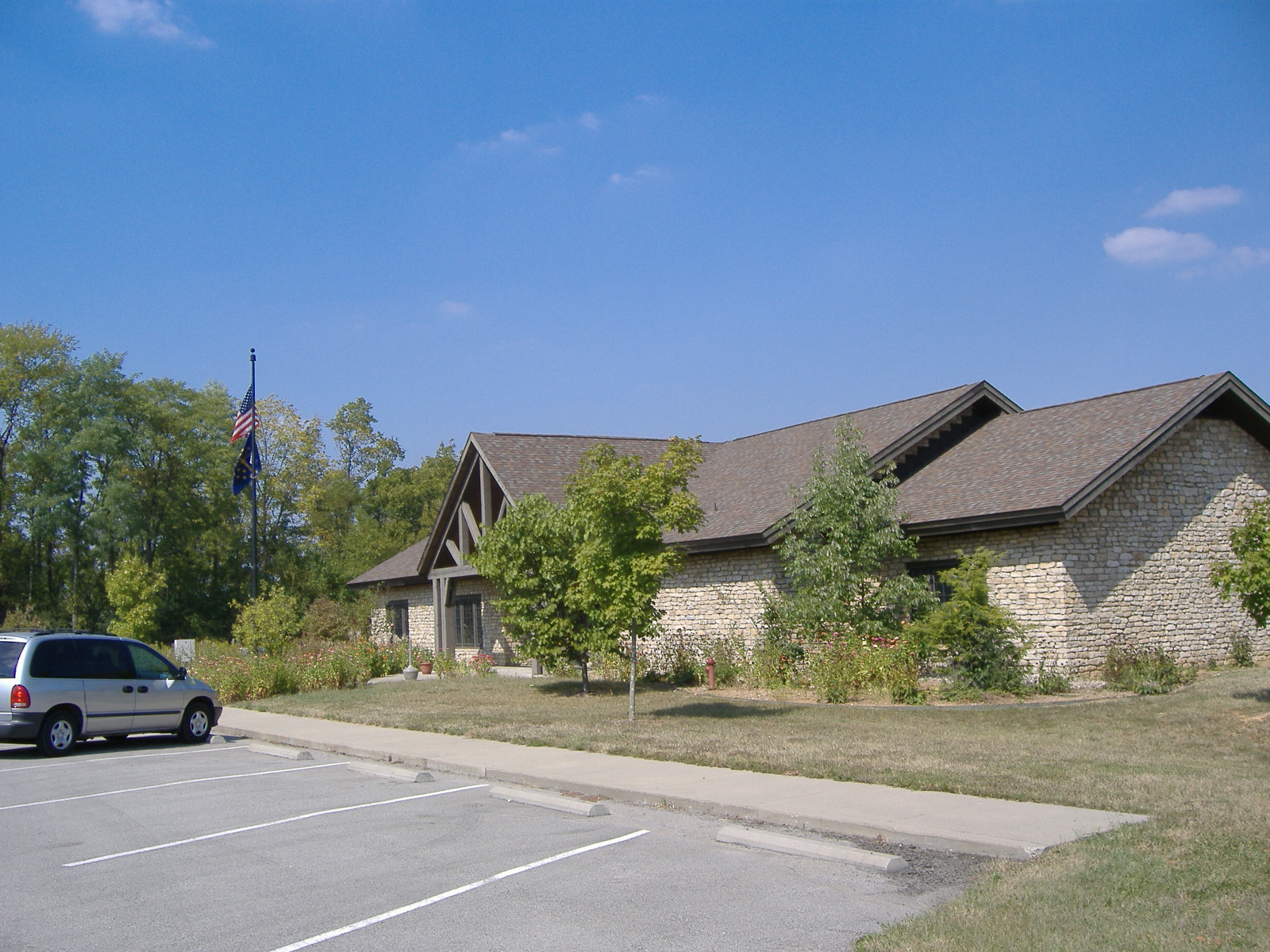
Park office

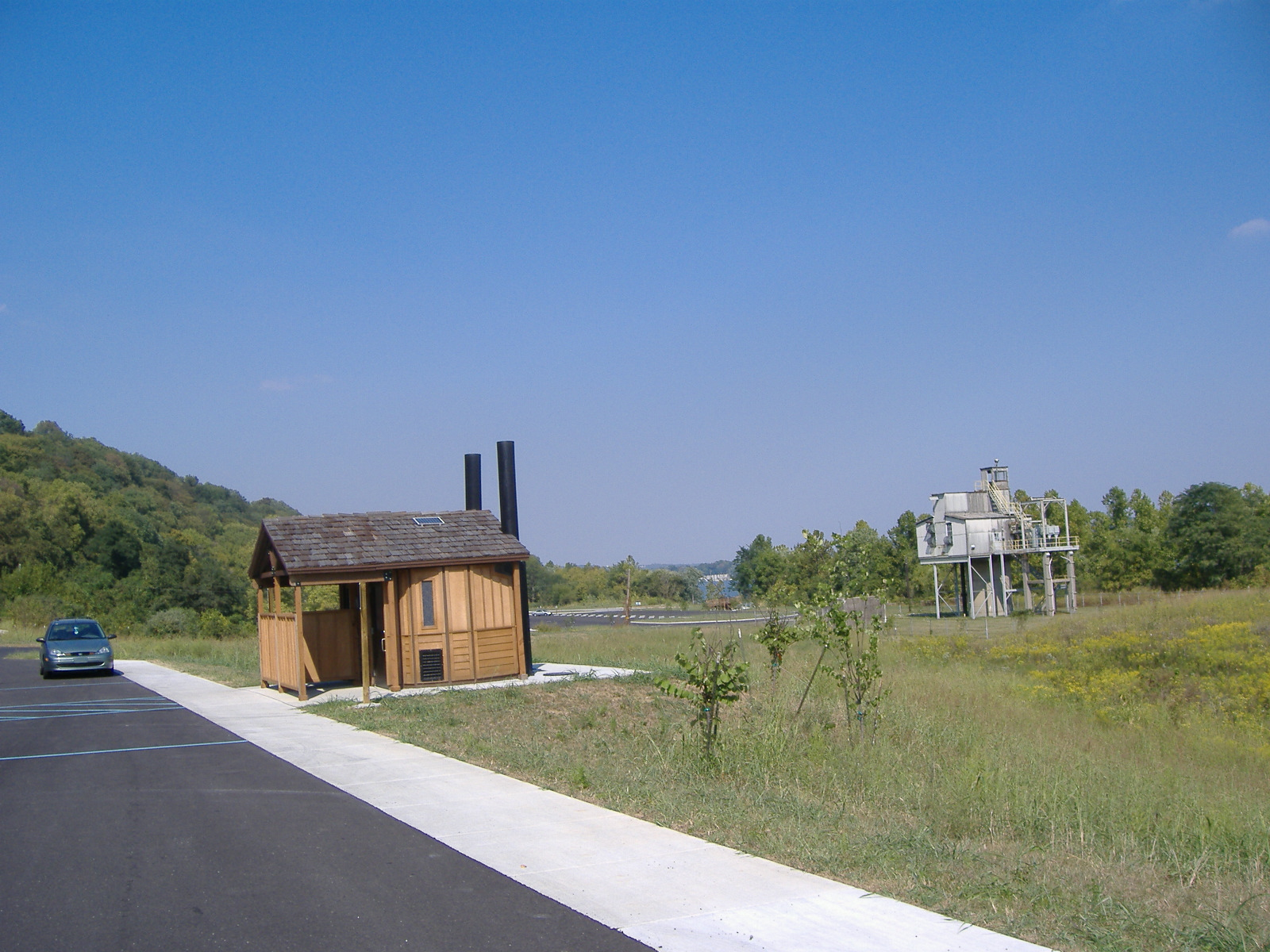
Distant view of river landing

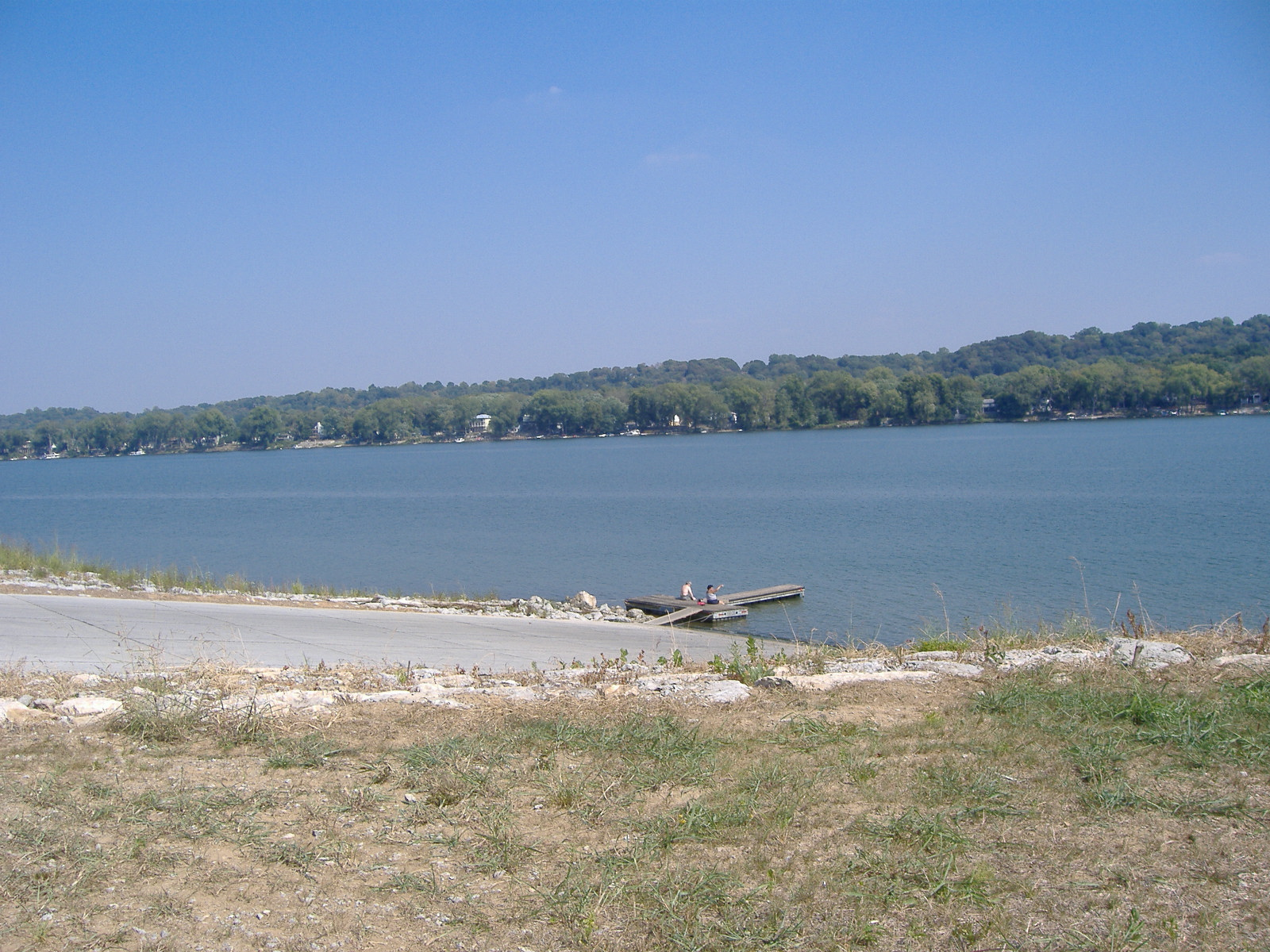
River landing

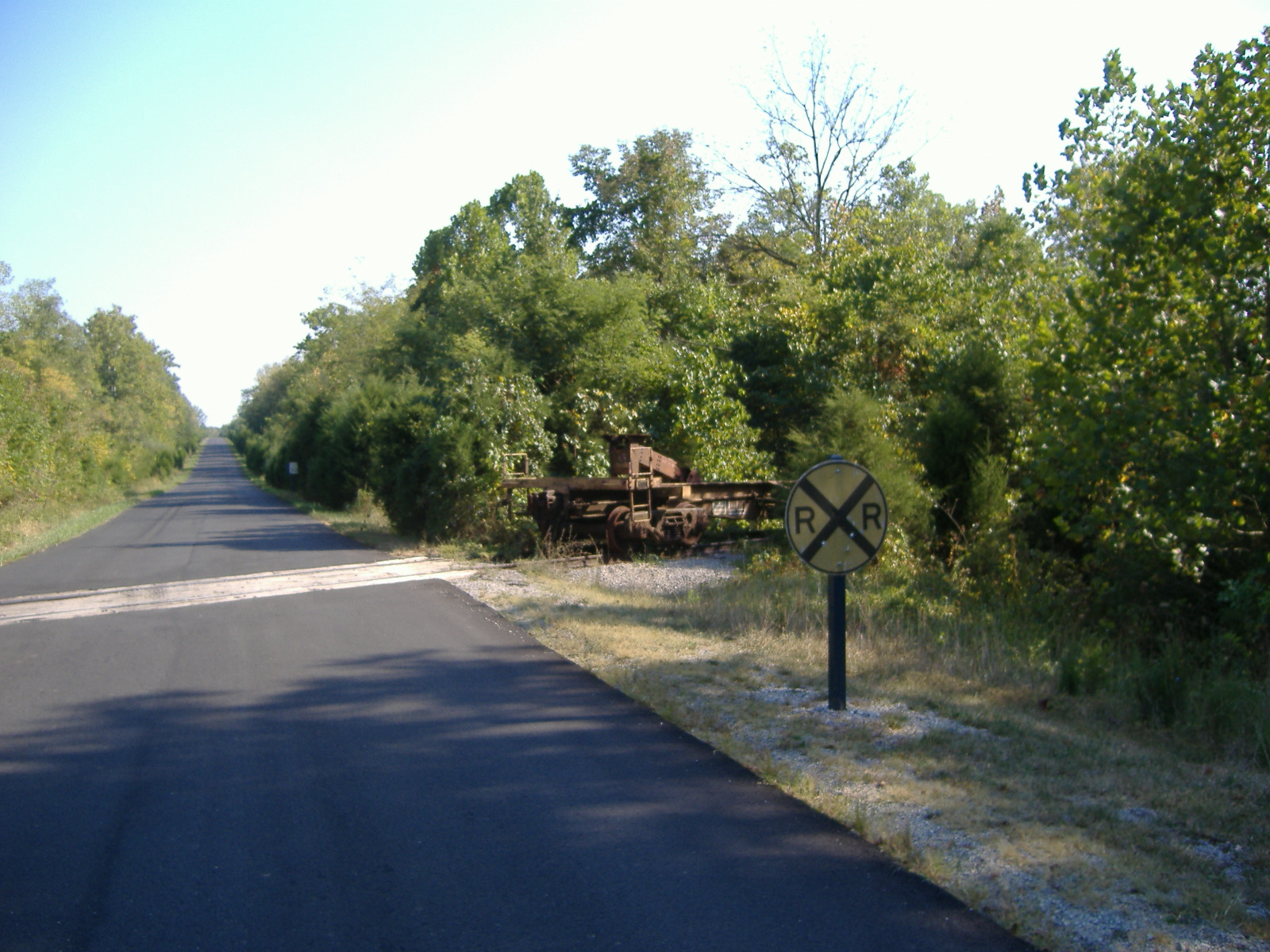
Remains of the area's time as part of the IAAP still exist all over the property

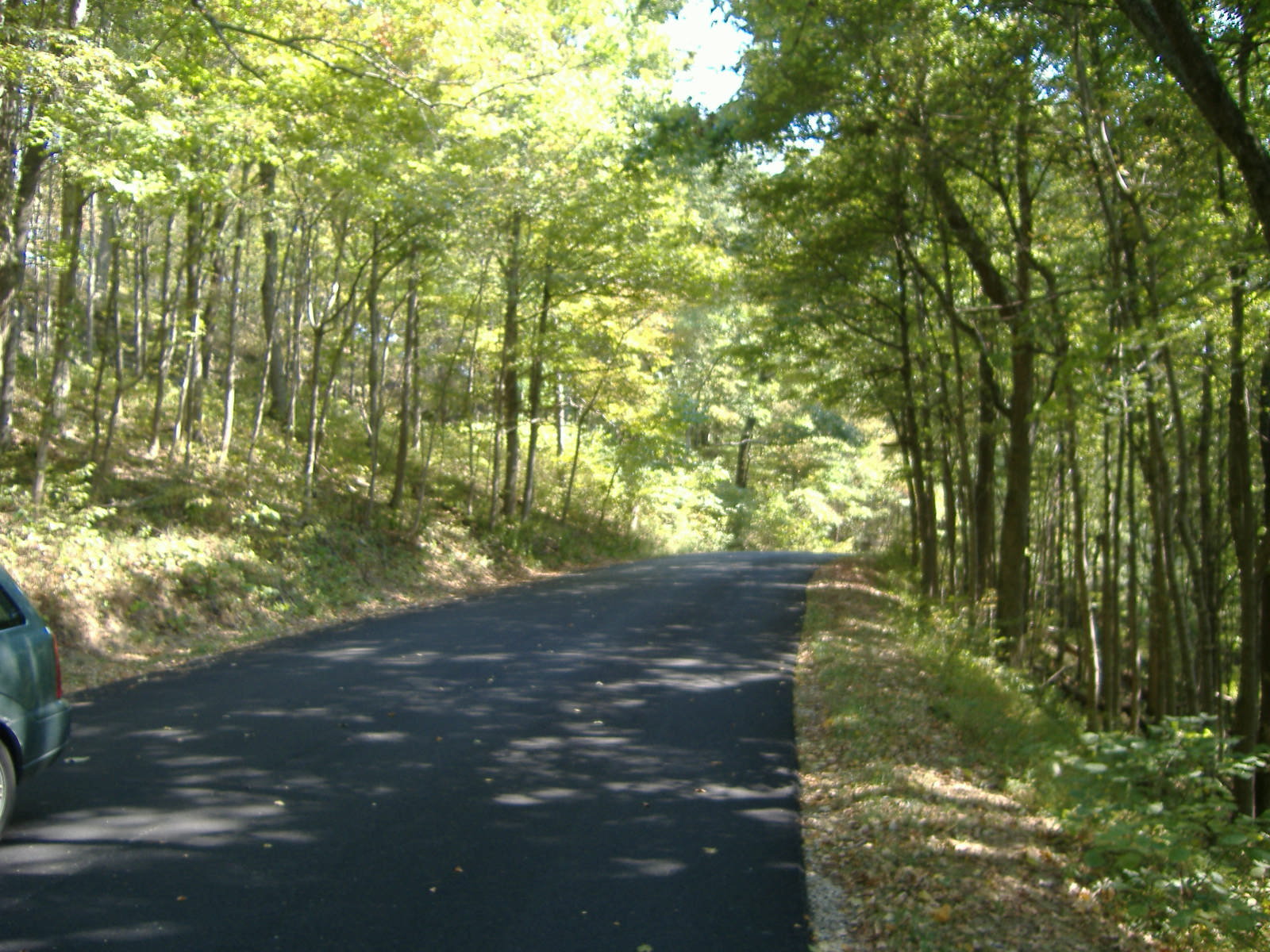
Road leading to the river landing

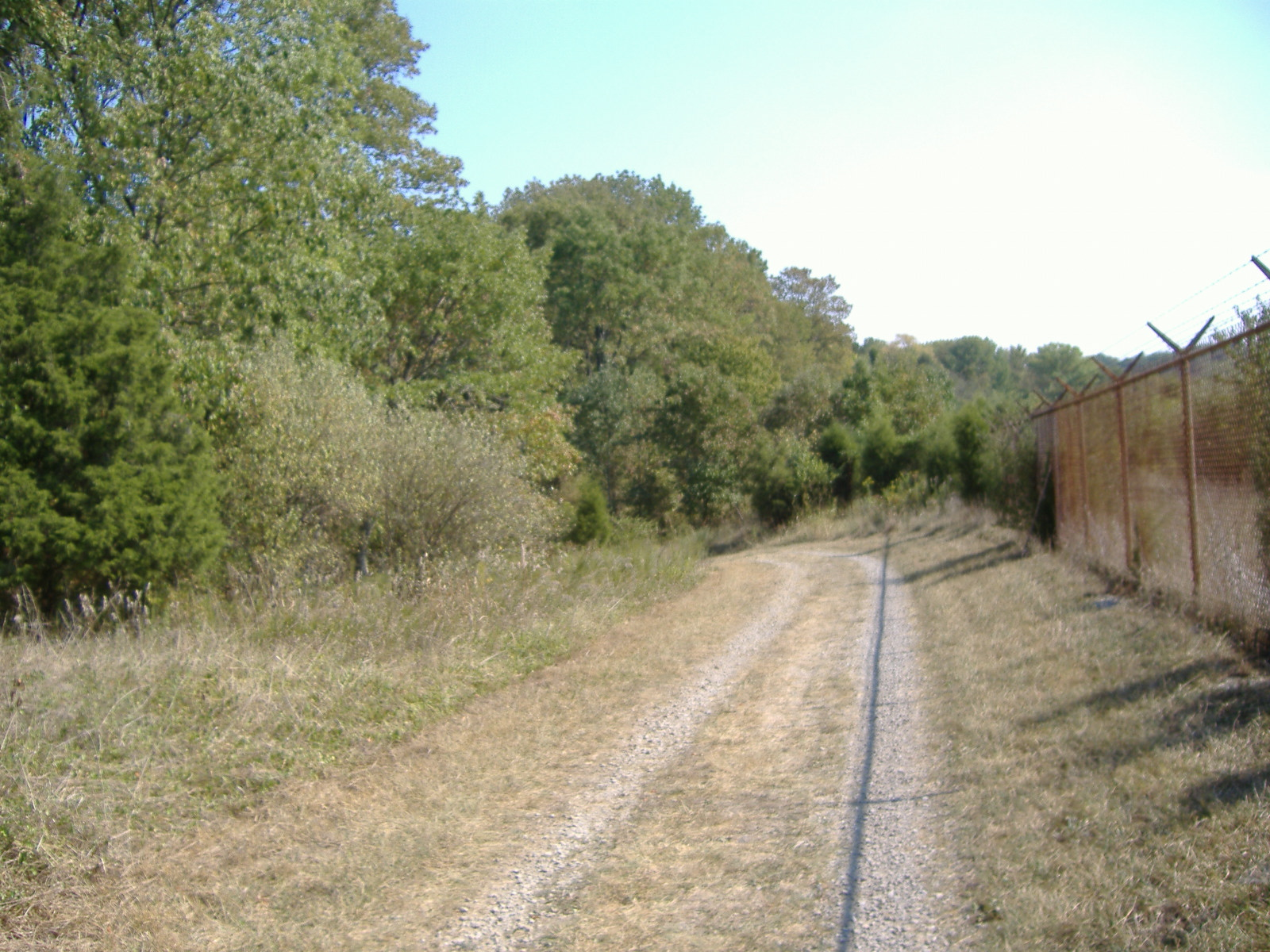
Start of Trail 3, using remains of the road to Rose Island

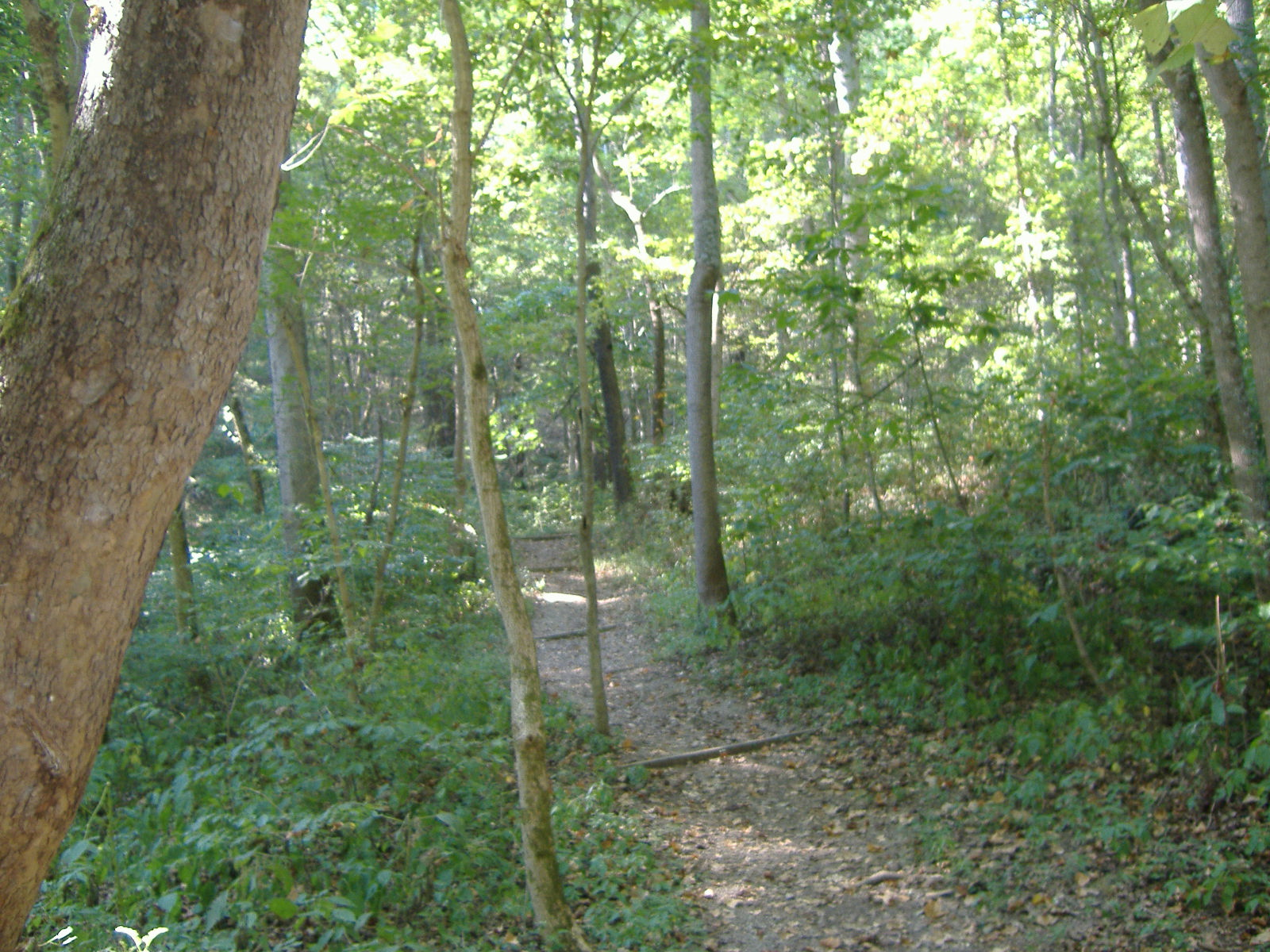
Trail 3 leading from the Rose Island section, where the ruggedness start

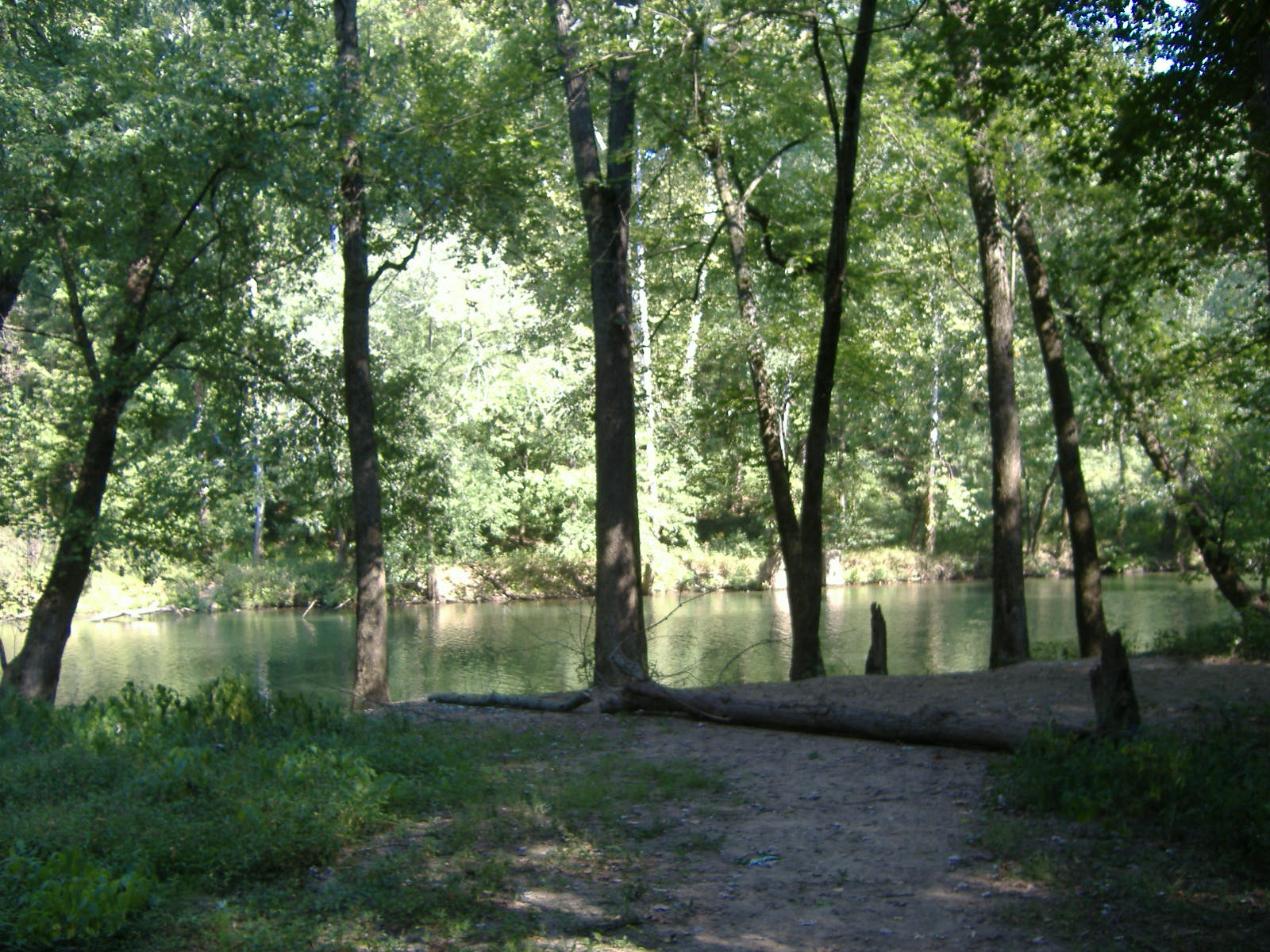
Waterfront along Fourteen Mile Creek
