= Jeffersonville Quartermaster Depot =

US Army warehouse located in Jeffersonville, IN operated 1871–1958

Coordinates: 38°17′17″N 85°44′08″W

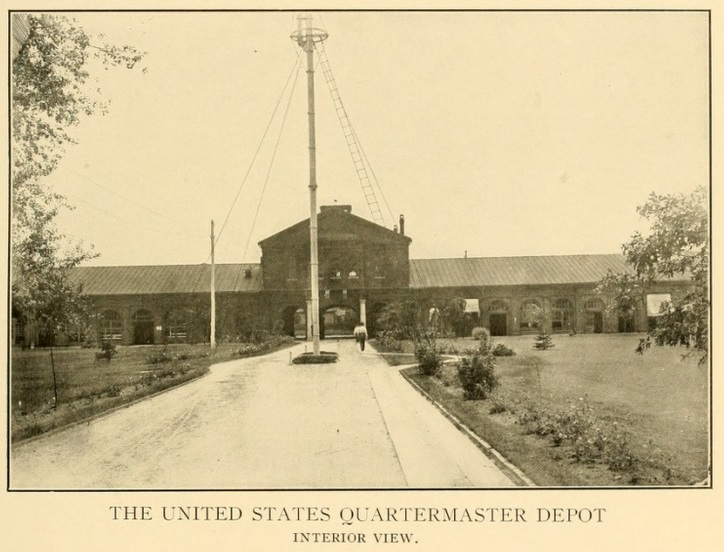
Pre-1909 picture of Depot.

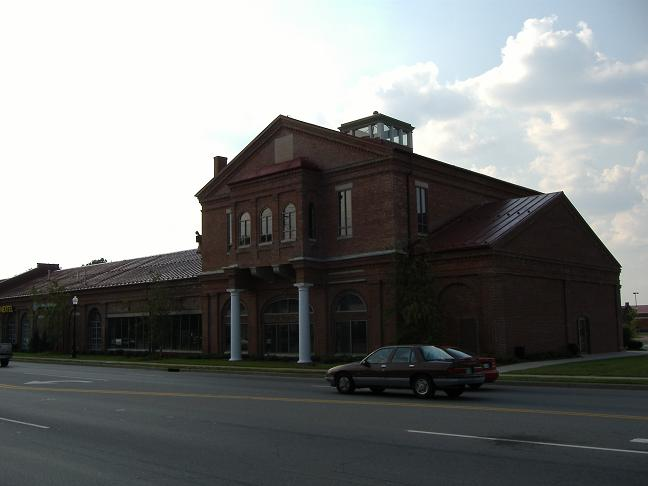
A picture of the front of the Quadrangle, September 2006.

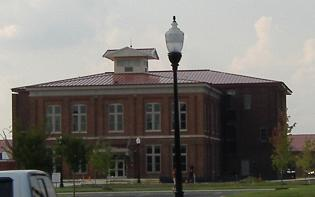
New Jeffersonville City Hall within the Quadrangle.

Jeffersonville Quartermaster Intermediate Depot (JQMD) was a military warehouse located in Jeffersonville, Indiana. Originally covering four city blocks (the Quadrangle), it expanded to ten city blocks by the end of World War II.

== History ==
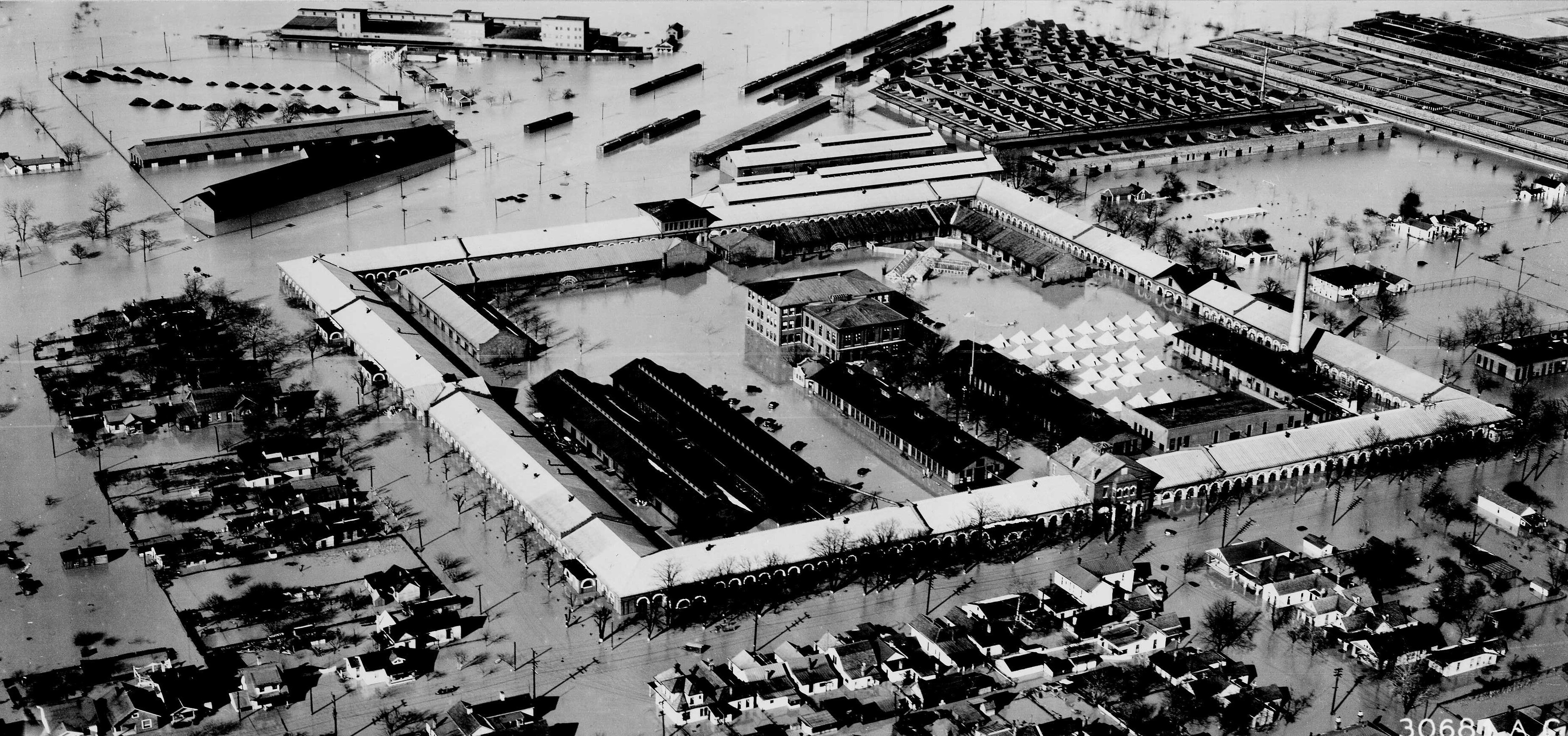
Aerial view during Ohio River Flood, 1937

At the end of the Civil War, it was the only depot in the Ohio Valley to not be disbanded.

In 1871 the U.S. Army decided to build an edifice that would contain all the individual units that had spread all around Jeffersonville. Quartermaster General Montgomery C. Meigs designed the structure, which opened in 1874. Frederick Law Olmsted also helped design the facility, and much of his vision still exists with its brick structures and arched glass portals, but more of Meigs' vision won out. A 100-foot (30 m) tower was initially built as both watchtower and watertower, but was razed in 1900 to make the power plant into a two-story headquarters building.

During the Spanish–American War, 100,000 uniform shirts a month were produced, and in World War I 700,000 of the shirts were made. This gave the depot the nickname "America's largest shirt factory". In World War II the depot produced $2.2 billion in goods for the war effort. It stayed in operation for the Korean War, but by 1957 it was decided to close the facility, which happened in 1958.

The U.S. Census Bureau, Kitchen Kompact, and Kessler Distilling acquired much of the facilities, with the original Quadrangle becoming a low-rent shopping center. A fire on January 18, 1992, destroyed the southeast quadrant, and it was feared the facility would be eliminated. The city of Jeffersonville bought the facility to ensure its long-term existence.

In 2001, $300,000 was secured to renovate the Quadrangle. A gut-renovation project ensued between 2005 and 2006, and today it is home to numerous offices, storefronts, and the city hall for Jeffersonville.

== See also ==
- Naval Ordnance Station Louisville
