= Indiana Army Ammunition Plant =

US Army manufacturing plant operated from 1941 to 1992 near Jeffersonville, IN

Coordinates: 38.382103°N 85.687008°W

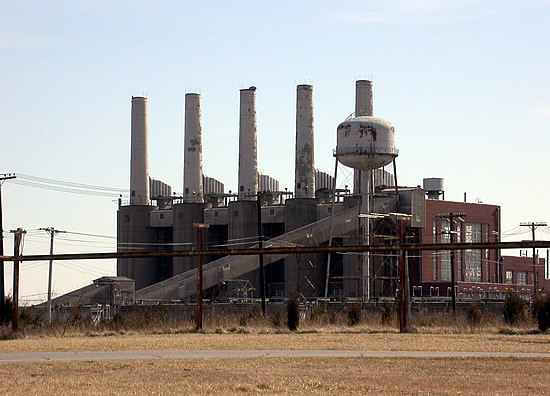
One of the abandoned power plants.

Main Laboratory, building 706–1.

Disused rail cars line a track built in 1975 for the new smokeless powder manufacturing facility that was completed in 1979. The new plant was never fully utilized and was demolished in 2008.

Poacher House, building 112–2.

The Indiana Army Ammunition Plant was an Army manufacturing plant built in 1941 between Charlestown and Jeffersonville, Indiana. It consisted of three areas within two separate but attached manufacturing plants:

- Indiana Ordnance Works Plant 1 (IOW#1): (3,564.71 acres) made smokeless powder
- Indiana Ordnance Works Plant 2 (IOW#2): (2,757.49 acres) made rocket propellant
- Hoosier Ordnance Plant (HOP): (4,326.8 acres) manufactured (and loaded) propellant charge bags

== Creation ==
In 1940 it was announced that the world's largest smokeless powder plant would be built near Charlestown, as the land was close to the Ohio River, giving it the water necessary for making smokeless powder, and the fact that the land was cheap because parts of it were unsuitable for farming, and because few individuals lived on it. The plant was built and operated as a Government-Owned, Contractor-Operated (GOCO) facility.

Actual building of IOW Plant 1, a six line plant with support facilities, started on September 4, 1940, although officially it started on August 28, and was completed on May 31, 1942. The first line was put into production in April 1941. The IOW facilities were built and operated initially by E.I. DuPont de Nemours and Co. During World War II the production of this plant exceeded the total World War I production of all other smokeless powder producing plants in the US. During the Korean War, DuPont cleaned away the excess powder and restarted production in 1950. The plant ran a maximum capacity with 3,000 employees until 1954.

IOW Plant 2, designed as a three line facility for the production of double base rocket propellant, was started in November 1944 but stopped, without completion, on V-J Day. All areas except the powder storage facilities were placed in caretaker status. In September 1960 all stored powder was removed and 1,546.62 acres (6.2589 km^{2}) were submitted to GSA as excess. The remaining 2,757.49 acres (11.1592 km^{2}) were utilized as woodland, crop land, and the site of a new automated black powder manufacturing facility.

The Hoosier Ordnance Plant was built by W-H-M-S Construction company (Winston Brothers, Haglin, Missouri Valley and Solitt) and operated by Goodyear Engineering Corporation (GEC). Production started in September 1941 and continued until V-J Day in 1945. Layaway was completed in February 1946. Limited production resumed in 1950 until a rehabilitation of the facility was completed in 1952. Goodyear took complete control over production in July 1952 under a Cost Plus Fixed Fee contract and continued until layaway of the facility in September 1957. Employment at the HOP during this period reached a high of 8,067 in August 1953, during the Korean War.

A residential area named "River Ridge" was constructed along the river as part of Plant 1, containing houses occupied by officers and directors of the facility.

In May, 1941, the three plants employed 27,520 people, which helped the area recover from the Great Depression.

== Post-war era ==
The three plants were combined as the Indiana Arsenal under War Department Circular No. 329 on November 30, 1945, and renamed the Indiana Army Ammunition Plant in August 1963 by Department of the Army General Order No. 35.

In March 1959, Goodyear took over maintenance of all plants, and was succeeded by Liberty Powder Defense Corporation in November 1959. Olin Mathieson Chemical Corporation dissolved Liberty Powder (an operating unit) and assumed control effective October 1, 1962 and continued operations until April 1972, when it was succeeded by ICI Americas. After disposal of Plant 2, the plant had 10,655 acres (43 km^{2}), 1,700 buildings, 30 miles (50 km) of fence, 84 miles (135 km) of railroad track, and 190 miles (310 km) of roads.

In June 1960, 67.26 acres (272,200 m^{2}) of Plant 1 was turned over to Clark County, which uses it as the site of the 4-H Center.

== End of the facility ==
The ammunition manufacturing facility, placed into modified caretaker status in 1992, was operated by ICI Americas as Facility I (an industrial park), and approved for transfer to the INAAP Reuse Authority (a Local Reuse Authority, or LRA) by congressional action. It became the River Ridge Commerce Center. Title to 3,000 acres (12 km^{2}) was transferred to the LRA in October 2007 and transfer of another 3,000 acres (12 km^{2}) located in Plant 1 after it was cleaned up.

4,500 acres (18 km^{2}) were transferred to the State of Indiana and is operated by the Indiana Department of Natural Resources as Charlestown State Park.

E W Wells Group, an environmental company based in Dallas Texas, is performing a portion of the explosive residue threat removal and building demolitions operations. The final stages of plant cleanup were scheduled for completion by 31 December 2014.

The final land transfer to River Ridge Development Authority took place in October 2016. A large amount of land along the Ohio River which includes the River Ridge houses was deeded to Charlestown State Park. The U.S. Corps of Engineers officially moved out on 31 October 2016.

== Today ==
Three things happened to the land:

Old field on former plant land in Charlestown State Park, Indiana, 2026

1. The northern most land of Indiana Ordnance Works Plant 2 and some along Highway 62 was sold into private ownership.
2. Most of Indiana Ordnance Works Plant 2 and a large portion along the Ohio River became Charlestown State Park.
3. River Ridge Development Authority has been transforming the land in Indiana Ordnance Works Plant 1 and Hoosier Ordnance Plant into an industrial park known as River Ridge Commerce Center.

== See also ==
- Jeffersonville Quartermaster Depot
- Naval Ordnance Station Louisville
