= Taganrog Palace of Youth =

- Таганрогский дворец Молодежи (Russian)
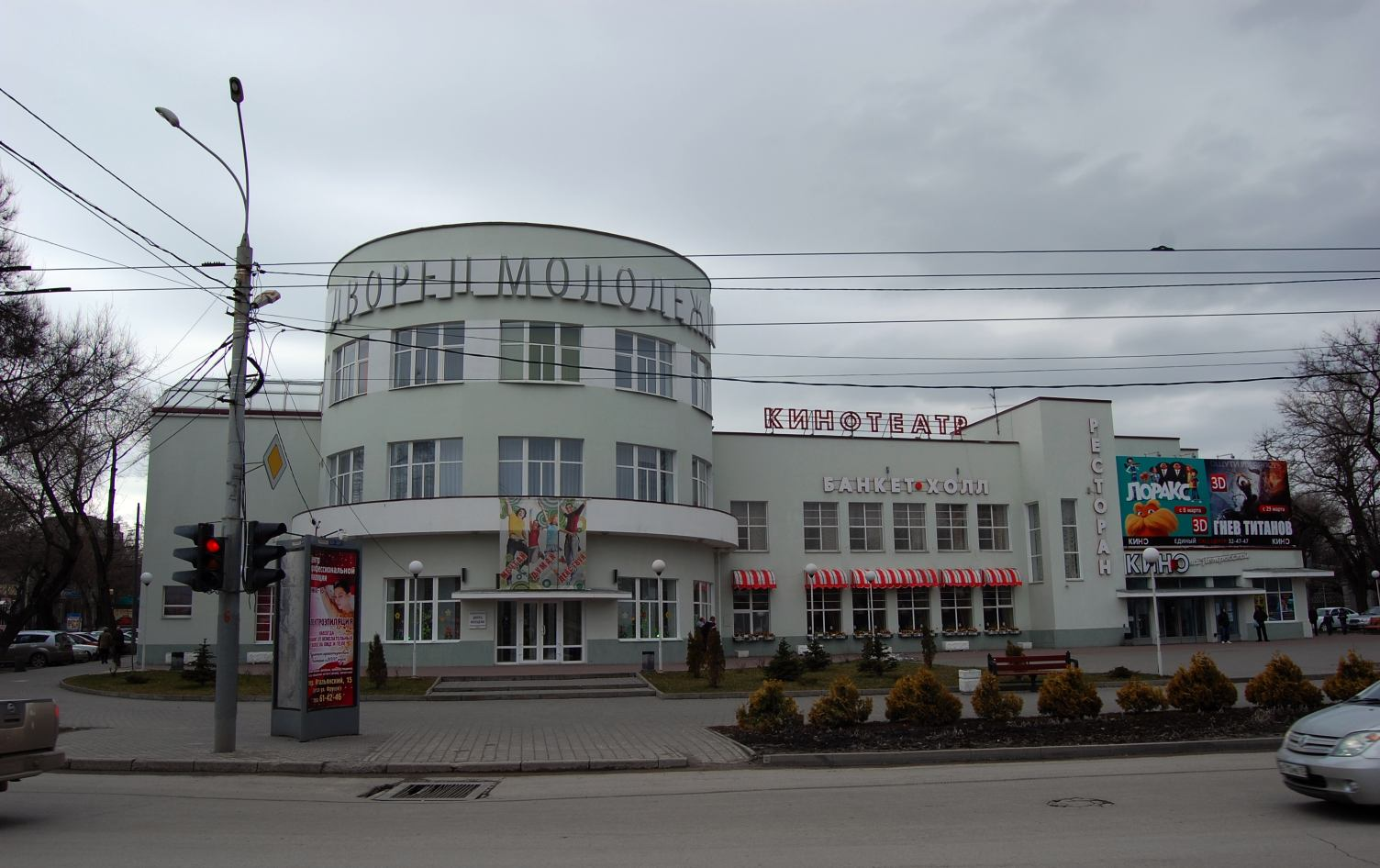
- Taganrog Palace of Youth,2012

- Location within Russia
- Location: 107, Petrovskaya str. Taganrog, Rostov oblast Russia

History
- Built: 1923-2011

Site notes
- Architect: M.F. Pokorny
- Architectural style: Constructivism
- Owner: S.I Fedyanin

Taganrog Palace of Youth (Russian: Таганрогский дворец Молодежи) is a municipal social, cultural and educational institution in Taganrog.

== History of creation ==
The Taganrog Palace of Youth was created in 2011 in the building of the former Palace of Culture of the combine factory.

In 2004 the owners of the Taganrog Combine Factory, being unable to finance activities of the Palace of Culture, sold the building to InterResource, which began its reconstruction. Under the agreement for 2004, signed by the City Administration with the firm InterResurs. They undertook to allocate 900 thousand rubles for the improvement and maintenance of the sanitary order of the territory adjacent to the Palace of Culture.

Subsequently the company "InterResurs" used the building of the Palace of Culture as a pledge on a credit received from the bank "Center-Invest".

In 2008 at the initiative of the city administration with the support of the regional administration, the building was bought from the private owner in municipal ownership, to which 100 million rubles were allocated from the regional budget.

Repair of the building divided into two parts "municipal" and "private" was started in August 2010. To repair the "municipal" part of the regional and municipal budgets was allocated about 56 million rubles. The same amount was allocated by investors for repairs and the "private" part of the Palace which housed the cinema "NEO" and the restaurant. The grand opening of the Palace of Youth took place on September 10, 2011.

== Building ==
Before the October Revolution, the barracks of the 274th Reserve Regiment were on the site. The beginning of the project works dates back to 1923. The author of the project is the architect M.F. Pokorny. The building is an example of constructivism in architecture. The building resembles the head of a spanner wrench as a symbol of peaceful labor. The Metalworkers' Club was built jointly by the Taganrog Instrument Factory (later - Taganrog Combine Plant) and the Krasny Kotelshchik Plant. The club was built by young people of Taganrog from the brick of the disassembled church in the name of St. Michael the Archangel. The main entrance has a semi-cylindrical facade of the lobby and the lobby of the second floor. The third floor of this wing was built in the 1960s. Metal window bindings emphasized the "industriality", and not the residential character of the building.

== Palace of Youth ==
On January 25, on the Day of Russian Students, a traditional ceremonial awarding of Tagarrog's nominal scholarships to the best students of the city takes place at the Youth Palace.

== Director of the Palace of Youth ==
From 2011 to the present day time – S.I Fedyanin
