= Simpson Memorial United Methodist Church =

Simpson Memorial United Methodist Church may refer to:

- Simpson Memorial United Methodist Church (Greenville, Indiana)
- Simpson Memorial United Methodist Church (Charleston, West Virginia)
