= Shabby chic =

Style of interior design

Shabby chic is a style of interior design that chooses either furniture and furnishings for their appearance of age and signs of wear and tear or distresses new ones to achieve the same result. Unlike much genuine period décor, this style features a soft, pastel-colored, cottage look.

== Description ==
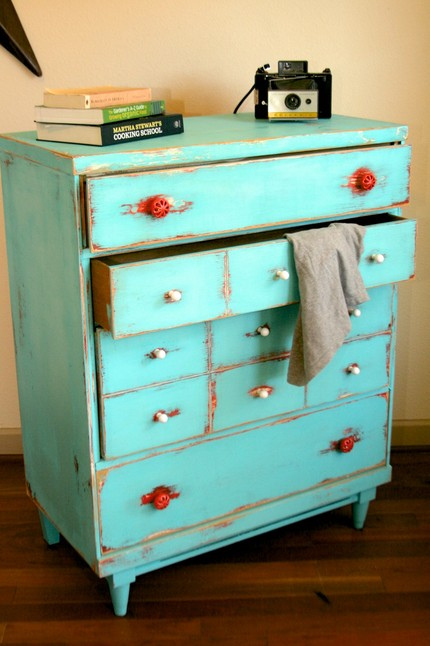
A dresser with a distressed finish and mismatched drawer knobs, in Shabby chic style

Shabby chic furniture is often antiques that have been heavily painted through the years, with many layers showing through obviously time-worn areas. Furnishings that are not genuine relics are usually selected for their resemblance to older styles, and may be reproduction pieces with a distressed finish that is faux painted using glaze or rubbing and sanding away of a painted top coat to show the wood or base coats. Elaborate furniture appliqués depicting flower swags and garlands, cherubs, and other motifs may be added. Repurposed antique pieces of obsolete usage such as pie safes and jelly cupboards are popular in shabby chic décor. Also popular are pillows made of old barkcloth fabric, vintage bed linens, chenille bedspreads, antique chandeliers, jute, and patterns of flowers, especially roses.

Fabrics tend to be cottons and linens, with linen being particularly popular, inspired by old French linens. Pure whites, as well as ecrus and worn or bleached-out pastel colors, are favorites, and bleached and faded are typical descriptions, although fabric may also be stained with tea for an antique look. Vintage floral patterns with pale colors, earth tones, and cotton ticking patterns are typical of shabby chic style. Newsweek used the term shabby chic to describe the avant-garde fashion designer Martin Margiela's 1992 fall fashion show, which took place in a Salvation Army furniture store and featured models in "wrinkled jackets, baggy-kneed pants and coats with inner linings hanging down from unfinished hems."

The general color scheme, besides white, is soft and neutral, often sky blue, rose pink, and beige. Hints from French-style interior design often show in shabby chic homes, such as Rococo-style lighting fixtures, furniture or wall paneling. The shabby chic aesthetic also expands to the garden, with the same design principles of using timeworn garden furniture and soft-hued accessories. Rose gardens are popular with the shabby chic style of décor.

Decorators consider shabby chic a relaxed, romantic style that looks comfortable, inviting, and feminine. The masculine counterpart would be "rustic," with deeper or richer colors and rustic furniture using unfinished wood, denim, burlap, sailcloth and homespun cloth.

Varieties of shabby chic style include:

- Cottage chic
- Beach cottage chic
- French country
- Gustavian (Swedish)

== History ==
The style started in Great Britain and evokes the type of decoration found in large country houses where there are worn and faded old chintz sofas, curtains, and paintwork and unassuming "good" taste, in understated contrast to the sentimental, overstated Victorian fashion. Though these forms were rather grand, the style has evolved to take in not just ornate decoration, as in the classic French château, but that of 18th-century Swedish and of the American Shakers, for whom simplicity and plainness were essential.

Recycling old furniture and fabrics has long been an important aspect of the look and was especially popular with the modern Bohemians and artisans who made up a sidelined counterculture movement during the 1980s, when expensive quality décor became very fashionable with the upper-middle classes. Rachel Ashwell founded a furniture chain called Shabby Chic and in 1996 published a book around the aesthetic, which she described as "the aura of old money, cushy comfort, and crafted indifference."

An offshoot of shabby chic is a trend towards "relicking" (from relic) of guitars and bass guitars to create a "roadworn" appearance.

== Origin of term ==
The phrase was used descriptively through the 20th century for both fashion and décor, and was popularized as an interior decorating style by Min Hogg in The World of Interiors magazine in the 1980s. It became popular in the United States in the 1990s with a certain eclectic surge of decorating styles with paints and effects, notably in metropolitan cultural centers on the West Coast of America, such as Los Angeles and San Francisco, with heavy influences from Mediterranean cultures such as Provence, Tuscany, and Greece.

== See also ==
- Cottagecore
- Cottage furniture
- Country bohemian style
- Dacha
- Industrial style
- Rustic modern
- Primitive decorating
