= Country bohemian style =

Fashion style

Country bohemian style is a fashion style synthesizing rural elements with the bohemian style, creating a bohemian approach to life in the country. The country bohemian style can refer to both fashion and interior design.

== Characteristics ==
The country bohemian style is a deliberate blending of two seemingly disparate styles, country and bohemian. It incorporates local, rural features into bohemian sensibilities, favoring sustainability and rustic features while also embracing modern contributions.

== See also ==
- Boho-chic
- Bohemian style
- Shabby chic
