= Pie safe =

Furniture designed to store food

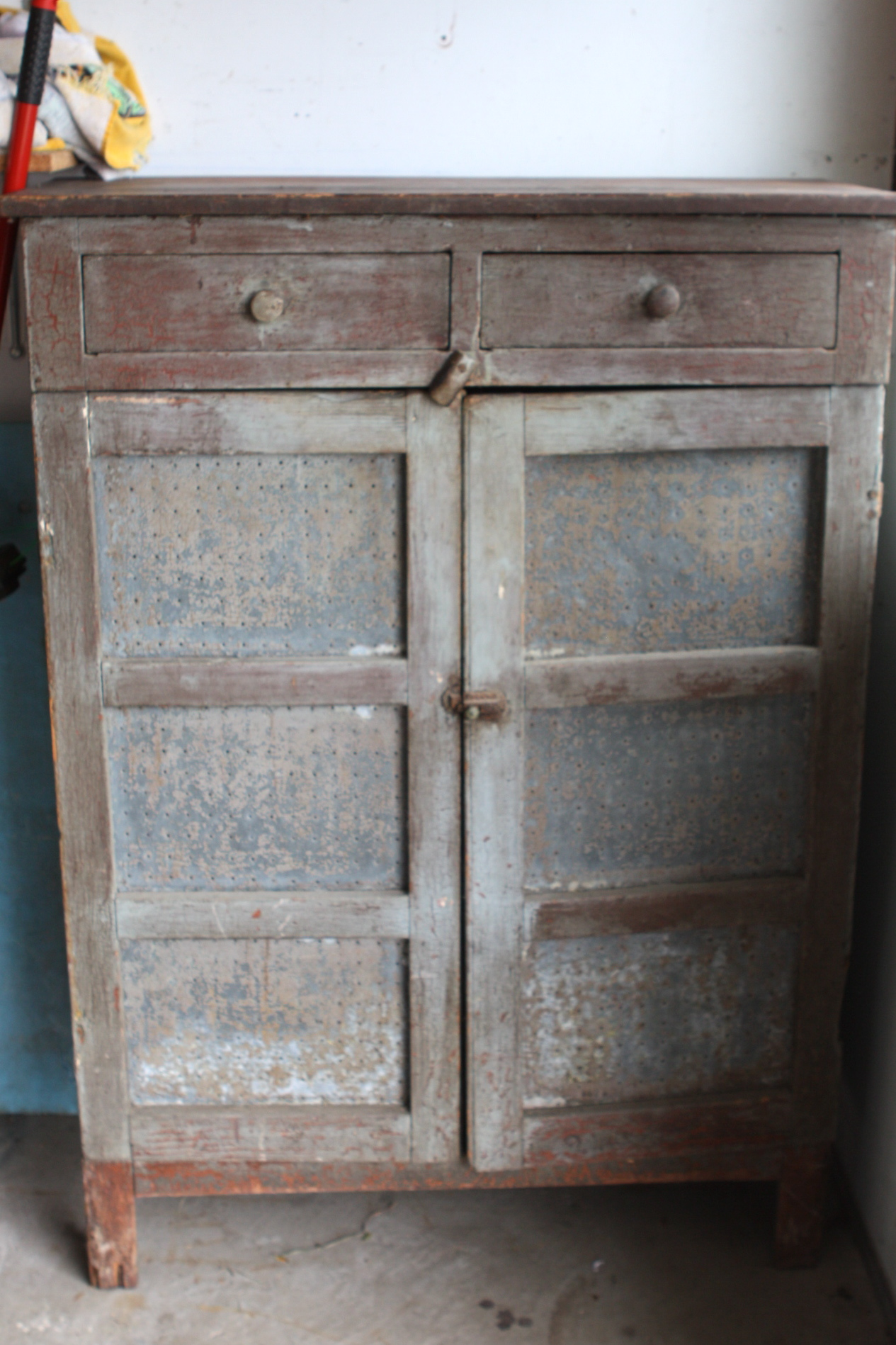
With closed doors

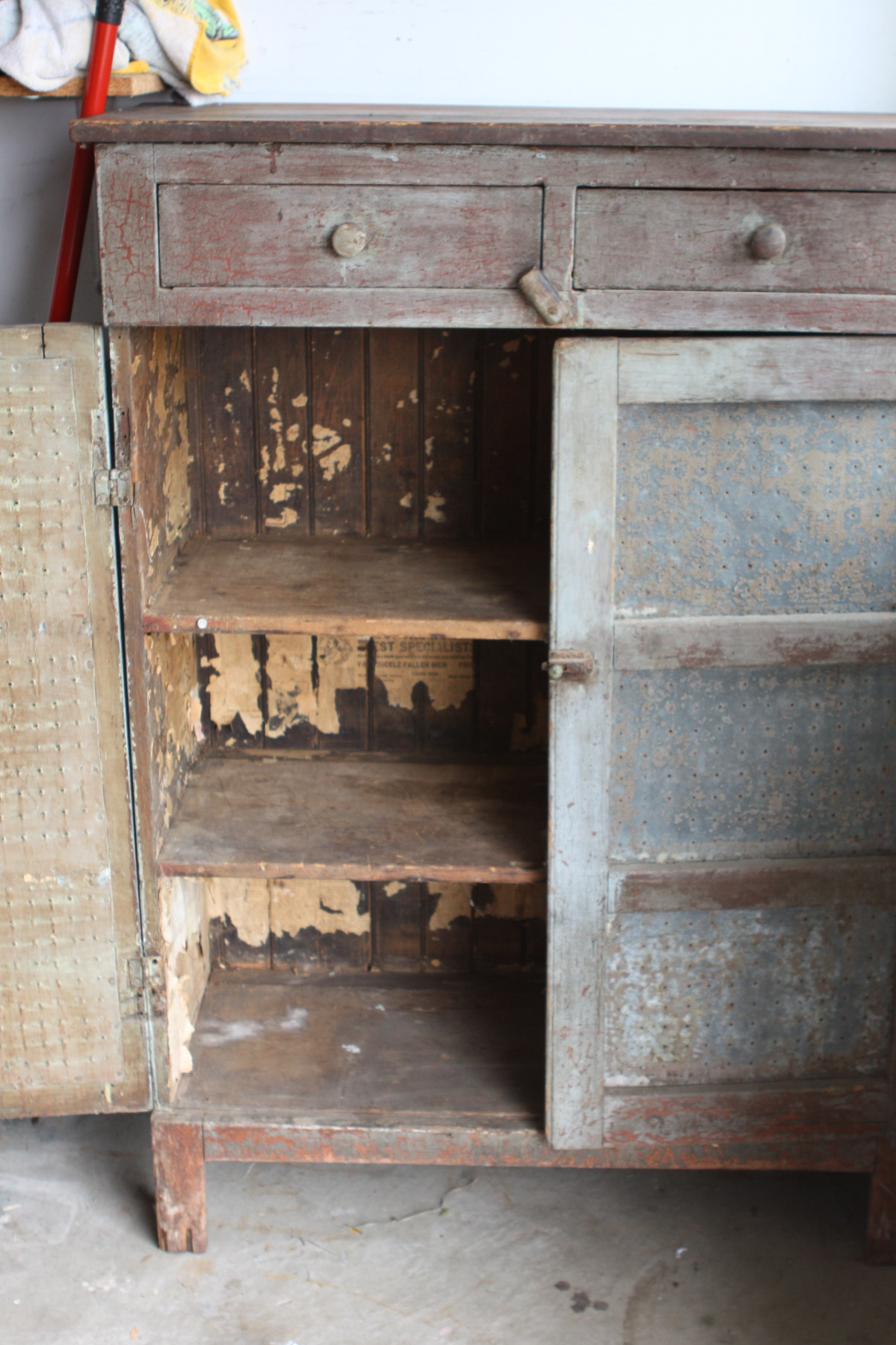
With door opened

A pie safe, also called a pie chest, pie cupboard, kitchen safe, and meat safe, is a piece of furniture designed to store pies and other food items. This was a normal household item before iceboxes came into regular use, and it was an important part of the American household starting in the 1700s and continuing through the 1800s.

The pie safe was used to store not only pies, but bread, meat, and other perishables as well, to protect them from insects and vermin.

== Origins ==
The origin of the pie safe can be traced back to the early 1700s in America. It was likely introduced by German immigrants to the country, who typically settled in the Pennsylvania area. These people later become known as the Pennsylvania Dutch. The pie safe was introduced to protect perishables and other ingredients from vermin and pests. Their popularity meant that most American homes during this period possessed a pie safe, or similar regional variation.

== Design ==
A typical pie safe is made of wood, is around the same size as a large bureau, and is approximately 18 inches (46 cm) deep. The shelves within the storage area are often perforated. The safe normally has two hinged doors on the front. These doors, and usually the sides, are ordinarily ventilated either with tin plates with punched holes or screens. The holes in the tin are often punched to produce an image such as a simple shape, or something more intricate like a church scene, eagles and stars, or even a Masonic emblem. A notable design is the Wythe County pie safe, which has a distinctive tulip pattern.

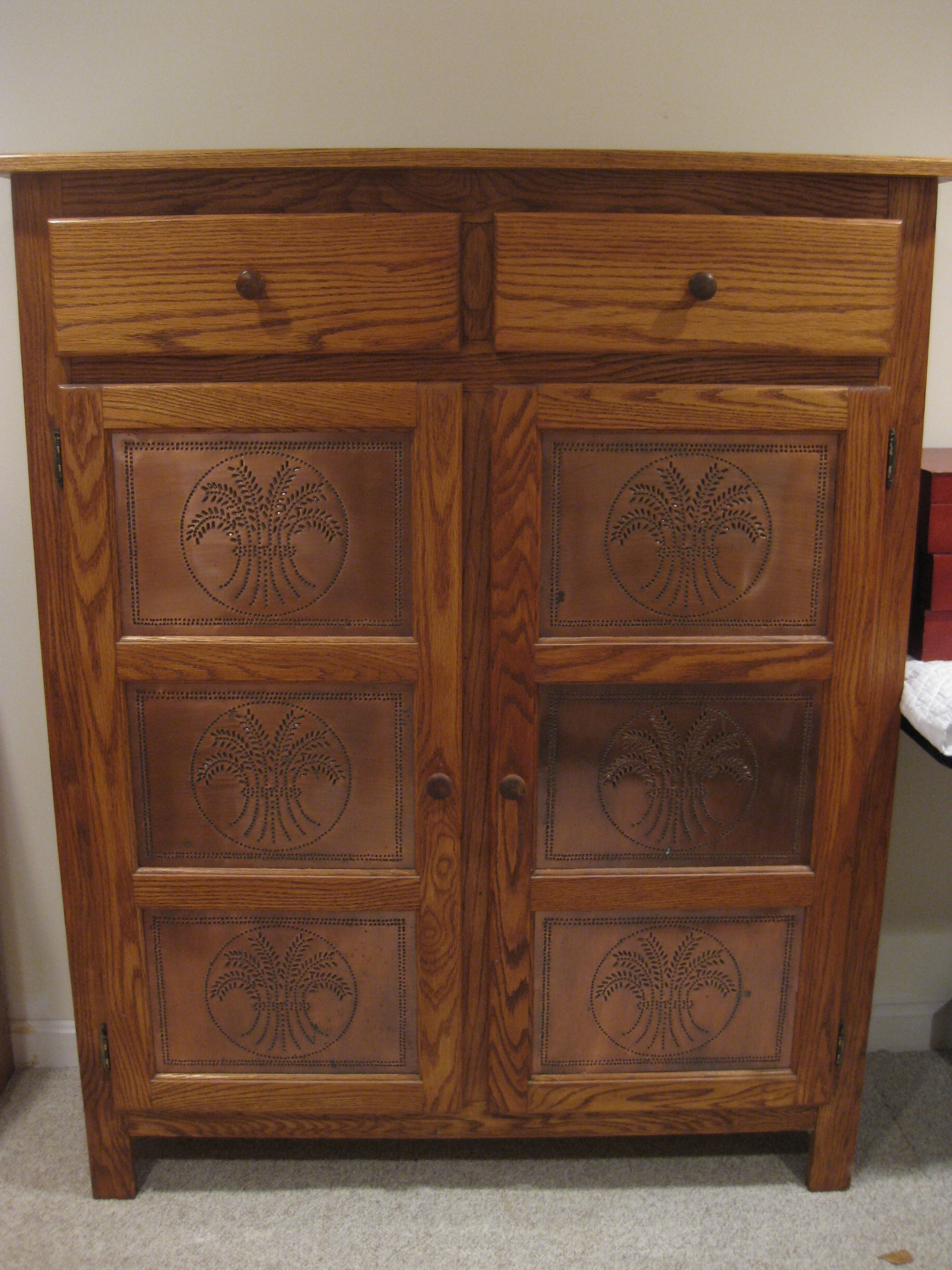
A modern pie safe in an American kitchen. The holes in the brass panels' sheaf design allow heat to escape from the safe when the doors are closed.

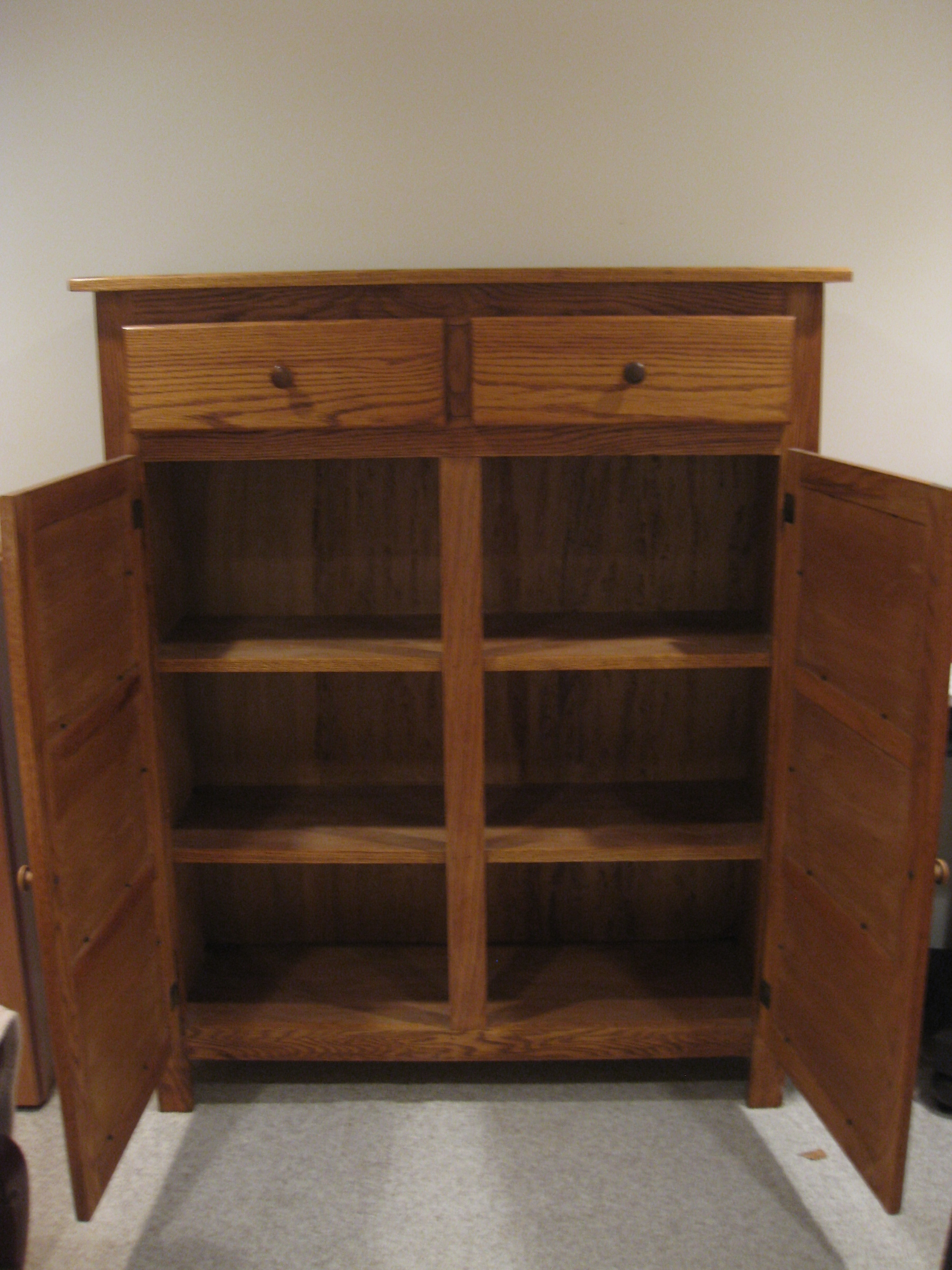
The same pie safe with doors opened, the usual method of cooling when animals and children are not present.

Pie safes that are freestanding are ordinarily made with long legs to keep them away from the floor. Others are wall-mounted or suspended from the ceiling. Most have a drawer, usually above the pie storage area, but sometimes below.

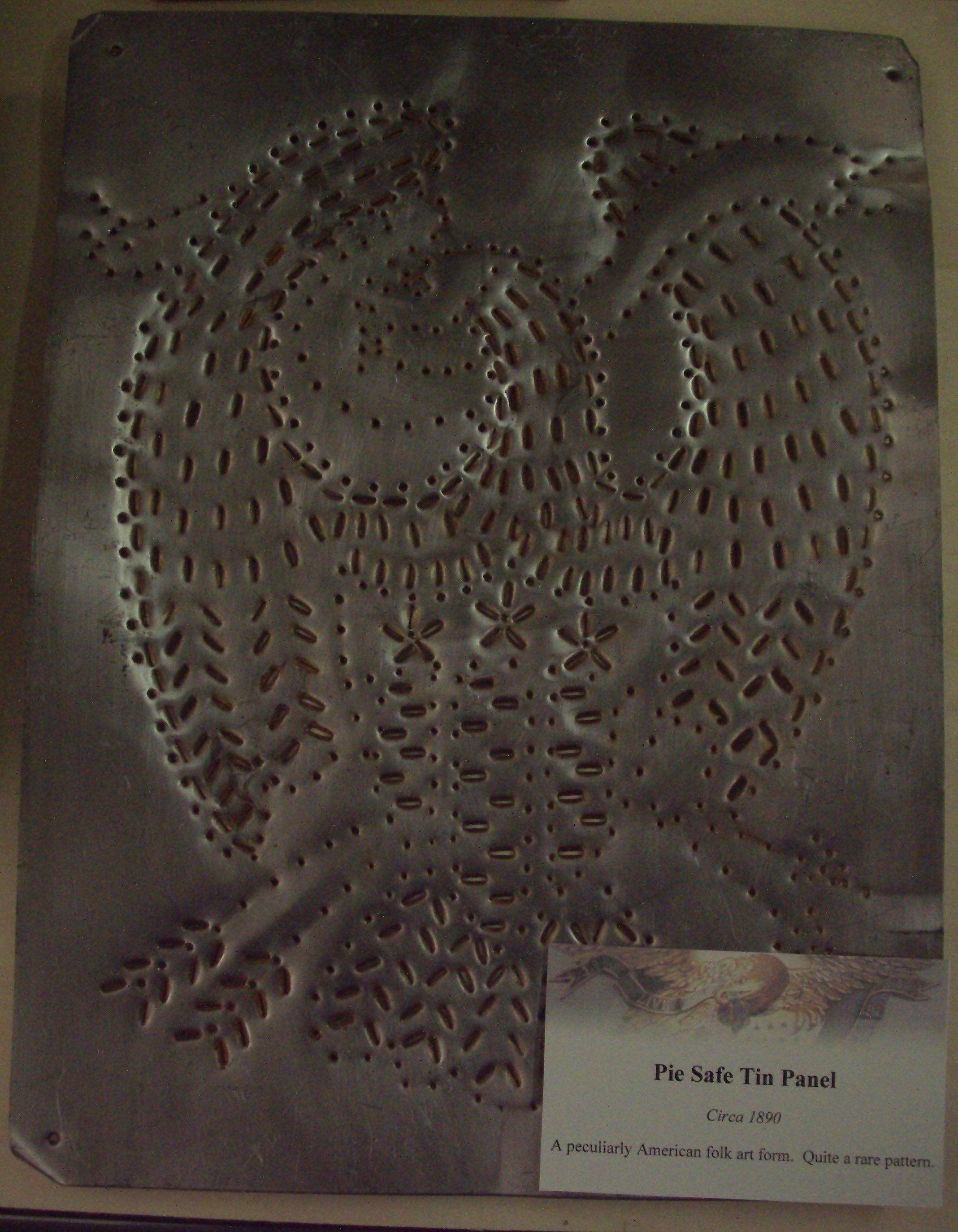
Detail of a tin panel from a pie safe at the American Eagle Exhibit held at Taylor University

A notable pie safe maker was the American industrialist and founder of PPG Industries (then known as the Pittsburgh Plate Glass Company), Captain John Baptiste Ford, who made tin pie safes and sold them throughout the United States.

== Regional variations ==
=== Garde-mangers ===
In Cajun or Creole Louisiana, a pie safe is referred to as a garde-manger or a garde de manger. Pie safes from this region had doors with punched tin panels known in the region as tôles de panneaux, or were inlaid with baluster, closely spaced. These items of furniture were considered utilitarian, as opposed to decorative, and were often coloured dull red, referred to as gros rouge.

=== California coolers ===
Many San Francisco homes built during the Victorian and Edwardian era (1890-1930) had built-in pie safes, known locally as "California coolers". These took the form of small pantries, typically off the home's kitchen, that were vented to the outside to keep contents at a stable temperature due to the city's generally cool weather.

== Impact and legacy ==
The origin of the name of chess pie may have come from the term "pie chest", another name for a pie safe.

Pie safes are considered to be collectable antiques and are commonly reproduced. They are popular pieces in the shabby chic interior design style.
