= John Baptiste Ford =

American businessman (1811–1903)

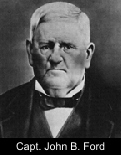
Captain John B. Ford

Captain John Baptiste Ford (November 17, 1811 – May 1, 1903) was an American industrialist and founder of the Pittsburgh Plate Glass Company, now known as PPG Industries, based in Pittsburgh, Pennsylvania, United States.

== Early life ==
Born in a log cabin in Danville, Kentucky, he never remembered his father, Jonathan Ford, who in 1813 joined the Kentucky Volunteer Homespun regiment to fight the British forces at New Orleans in the War of 1812 and never returned. His mother, Margaret, the daughter of Jean Baptiste, an immigrant from France who had fought in the American Revolutionary War, apprenticed young John at the age of 12 to a Danville saddlemaker. He ran away from the saddlemaker at age 14 and found his freedom in Greenville, Indiana, where he remained for the next 30 years.

== Greenville, Indiana ==
Ford began as an apprentice with his future father-in-law in the local saddle shop which led him into his first business venture. In 1831 at age 20, Ford married his school teacher Mary Bower (25 years old). The couple had two children both born in Greenville; Edward Ford (1843) and Emory Low Ford (1846). The couple operated a small dry goods store. Ford purchased The Station building which housed an old mill and saddle shop from its owner. He added a grocery and began making tin pie safes which he sold throughout the country.

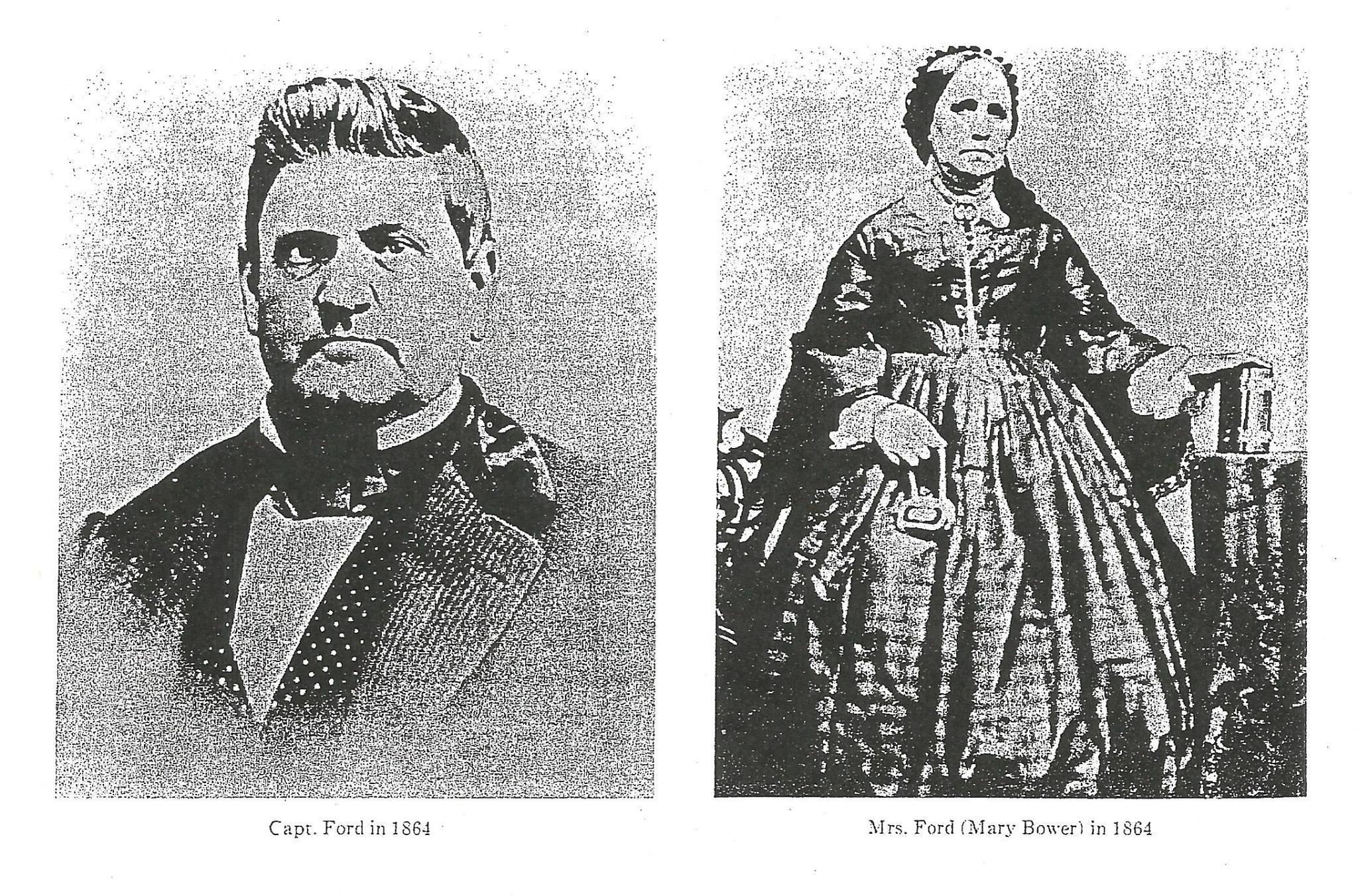
Pictured are Captain John B Ford and his wife Mary Bowers Ford, circa 1864.

The Station building, the original building that housed the old mill, saddle shop and grocery, still stands today. Historically referred to as The Station (sometimes the Old Mill and Ford's Flour Mill), the Greenville Station is the oldest commercial building in Greenville. Construction on the original wooden structure began in 1810 and finished in 1812. In 1840, Ford helped to erect the present brick structure. The Station was a stop for the 104-mile stagecoach route that ran from Falls Cities to the Wabash River.

Ford and his wife Mary had seven children. Their first child, Charles, died within nine months of birth. Their second child, John, died at 10 months. Their third child, Henry Ford, died when he was 15 years old. Their fourth child, a daughter, died aged 8. Their fifth child, Mary, only lived for five days. Their sixth child, Edward Ford (1843–1920), and seventh child, Emory Low Ford (1846–1900), went on to work in the family business.

Ford's great-granddaughter, Eleanor "Sandy" Torrey West, died in 2021, aged 108.

== New Albany, Indiana ==
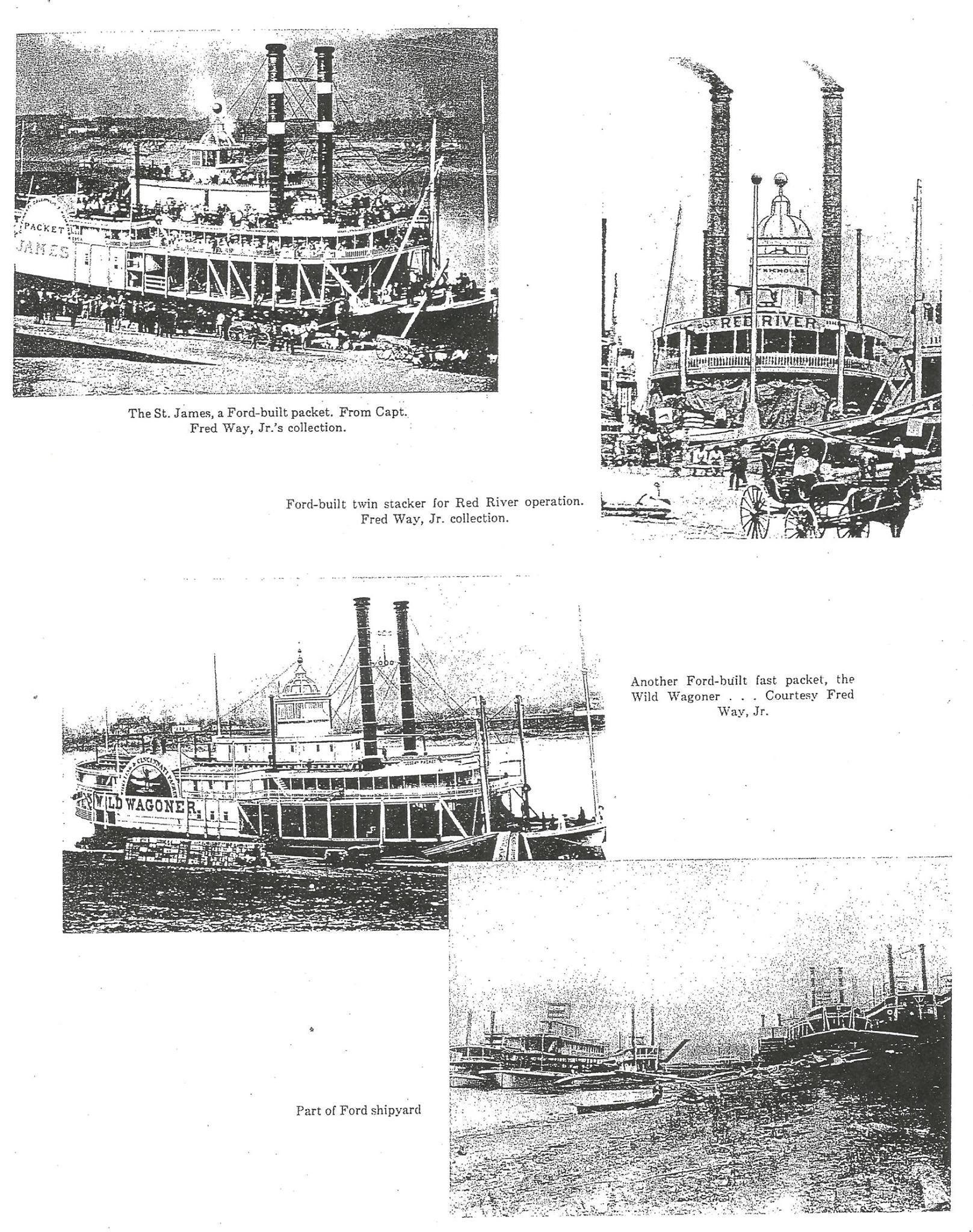
Pictured is a collection of steamboats produced by Captain John Baptiste Ford in New Albany, Indiana.

Ford moved to New Albany in 1854 and opened a factory to manufacture feed-cutting boxes constructed of wood and iron. Needing a reliable source of iron for his box manufacturing business, Ford built his own rolling mill and foundry and eventually produced railroad and commercial iron products.

=== Steamboat production ===
By the late 1850s, Ford realized he could not compete with the industrial iron giants located in the iron regions around Pittsburgh, and he converted his factory into a shipyard to produce steamboats. Ford produced his own steamboat line and was addressed as "Captain Ford" by many of New Albany's residents. During the Civil War, many of Ford's boats were utilized by the Union forces.

=== New Albany Glass Works ===
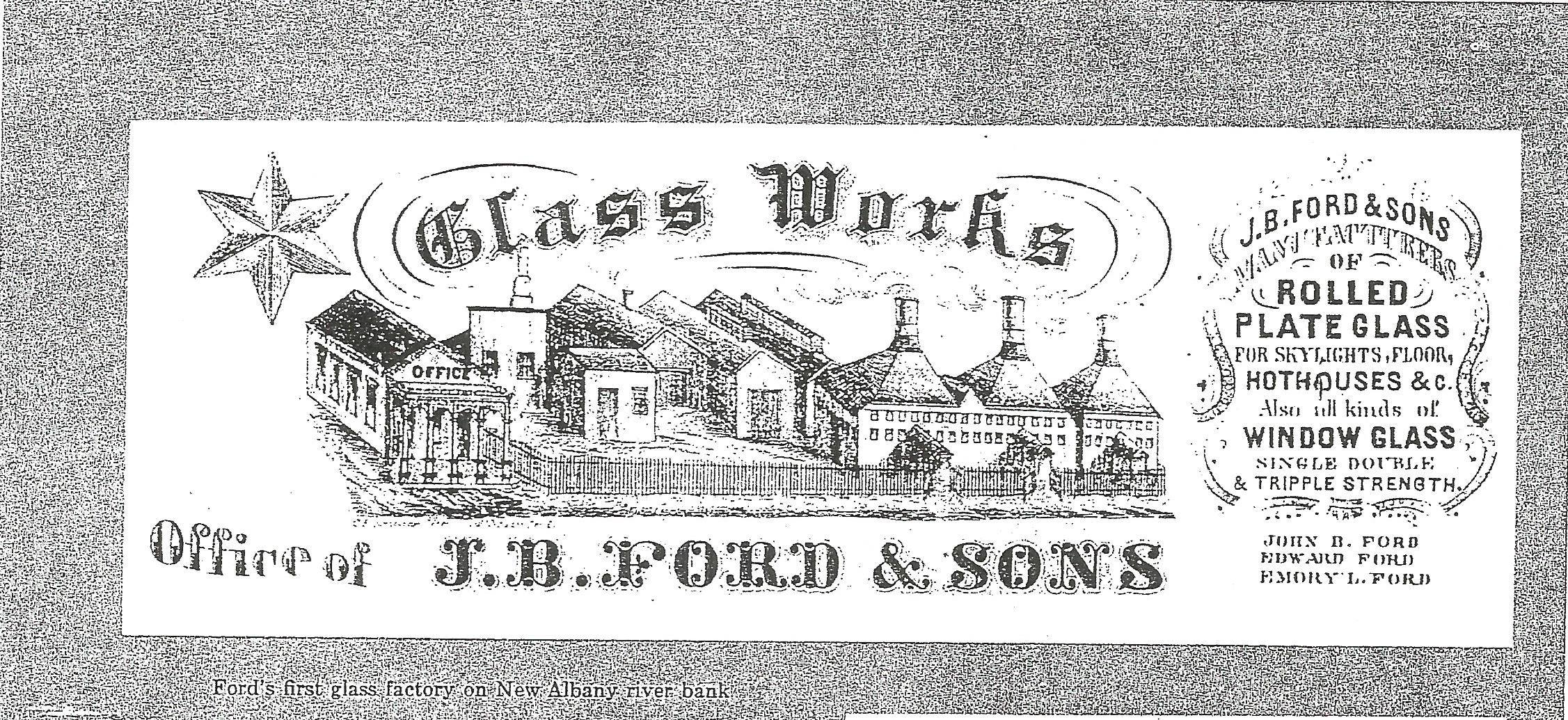
J.B. Ford & Sons in New Albany, Indiana

Ford's son Emory graduated in July 1864 from Duff's Mercantile College upriver in Pittsburgh. Emory marveled at the many glass works in the city, and soon they set up a small glass factory in New Albany known as the New Albany Glass Works. The company produced bottles and jars. In 1867, the Fords had greatly expanded the factory and began to study the technology to produce plate glass, which until now was imported from Europe. In 1870, they had successfully mastered the technology and had the skilled workforce in place to produce the first plate glass in the United States.

== Pittsburgh Plate Glass ==
In 1880, Ford left New Albany and opened the New York City Plate Glass Company with a plant in Creighton, Pennsylvania. In 1883, the business was reorganized as the Pittsburgh Plate Glass Company ("PPG"). PPG became the leading plate glass manufacturing facility in the country.

Tired of disagreements with their business partners, Ford sold his interest in the company in 1897. He formed a new venture to the west near Toledo, Ohio, the Ford Glass Company. It later became Libbey Owens Ford Glass Company. At one time he was in business with his first cousin, Washington Charles De Pauw.

== Michigan Alkali ==
In 1893, Ford founded a chemical company that supplied vital soda ash for the glass production. The company was located in Wyandotte, Michigan and named Michigan Alkali Company. Later, the company was renamed Wyandotte Chemical Company and became one of the nation's leading chemical firms at the time of John B. Ford's death, eventually becoming part of BASF and expanding into the BASF industrial complex.

== Ford City, Michigan ==
In 1902, the village was named in honor of Captain Ford, who at the time was President of the Michigan Alkali Company (now BASF Wyandotte) and prominent citizen in local affairs. All was not going well in Ford City during its years of growing. The Michigan Alkali Company had spread out along the Detroit River into both Ford City and Wyandotte. Each municipally assessed and taxed the chemical company differently. Certain necessary services and utilities readily available in Wyandotte were not available in Ford City. The Michigan Alkali Company had strongly sought tax relief and expanded utility services and suggested merging the two communities. Ford City and Wyandotte merged in 1922.

== Ford City, Pennsylvania ==
Ford City was founded in 1887 as a company town by the Pittsburgh Plate Glass Company (now PPG Industries) as the site for its Works No. 3 glass factory. The town was named in honor of the company founder, John Baptiste Ford. The factory employed as many as 5,000 workers in its heyday. PPG shut down its Ford City operations in the 1990s. The once largest employer in Armstrong County, Eljer Plumbing, shut down its Ford City plant in 2008.

In 1900, 2,870 people resided in Ford City borough proper; in 1910, 4,850 people lived there; in 1930, 6,127; and, in 1940, 5,795. The population was 3,451 at the 2000 census.

== John Baptiste Ford Drive ==
On December 11, 2017, the Town Council in Greenville, Indiana named a historic roadway after John Baptiste Ford. The roadway butts up to The Station Building which was originally built by Ford in the 1840s. The Station Building still stands today and is the oldest commercial building in town.

== Death ==
John Ford died at his home in Tarentum, Pennsylvania, in 1903. He is buried in Allegheny Cemetery in Pittsburgh. The town of Ford City, Pennsylvania, is named in his honor.

== See also ==
- List of people from the Pittsburgh metropolitan area
