= The Palace of Culture of the Combine Factory =

The Palace of Culture of the combine factory
- Дворец культуры комбайнового завода (Russian)
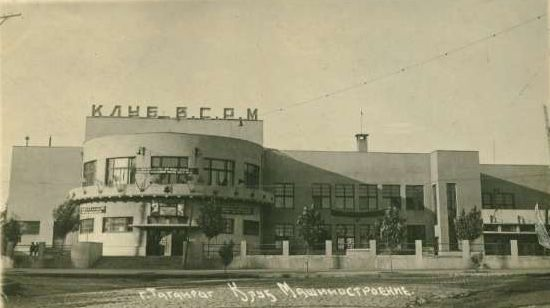
- 1928 Club

- Location within Russia
- Type: Museum
- Location: Taganrog, Rostov oblast Russia

History
- Built: 1923

Site notes
- Architect: M.F. Pokorny
- Architectural style: constructivism

The Palace of Culture of the combine factory (Russian: Дворец культуры комбайнового завода) is the Taganrog Palace of Culture, which belonged to the Taganrog Combine factory.

== Building ==
Before the October Revolution, in place of this building were situated the barracks of the 274th Reserve Regiment.

The author of the project is the architect M.F. Pokorny. The project works of the club began in 1923.

The club occupied the quarter between the streets Petrovskaya and Frunze and the alleys Klubny and Gogol.

The building is a bright example of constructivism in architecture. According to the construction, the building resembled the head spanner wrench as a symbol of peaceful labor. The Metalworkers' Club was built by the Taganrog Instrument Factory (later - Taganrog Combine factory) and the Krasny Kotelshchik factory.

The club was built by the young people of Taganrog from the brick of the disassembled church in the name of St. Michael the Archangel. Facades are plastered. The main entrance is accented by the semi-cylindrical facade of the lobby and the foyer of the second floor. The third floor of this wing was built in the 1960s. Metal window bindings emphasized the "industriality", and not the residential character of the building.

== History ==
In 2004, the owners of Taganrog Combine factory, being unable to finance the activities of the Palace of Culture, sold the building to «Interresource», which began its reconstruction.

In 2011, the Taganrog Palace of Youth was established in the building of the former Palace of Culture of the Combine factory.

== Art studio of Culture House of Combine factory ==
In the Culture House of Combine factory worked a studio of fine art, considered to be the strongest in Taganrog. In different years it was directed by artists Nikolay But, Valentina Russo, Leonid Stukanov.

== Names of the Palace of Culture ==
- Metalworkers' Club
- The club B.S.R.M (mechanical engineering)
- Club of the factory named after Stalin
- The Palace of Culture of the Stalin factory
- Palace of Culture of Combine Builders

== Links ==
- Виртуальная экскурсия по Зданию Дворца культуры комбайнового завода (Дворец молодёжи, 2011)
