= Rustic modern =

Style of interior design

Rustic Modern or rustic chic is a style of interior design that uses of historical period room installations or furniture within an overall more modern room design.

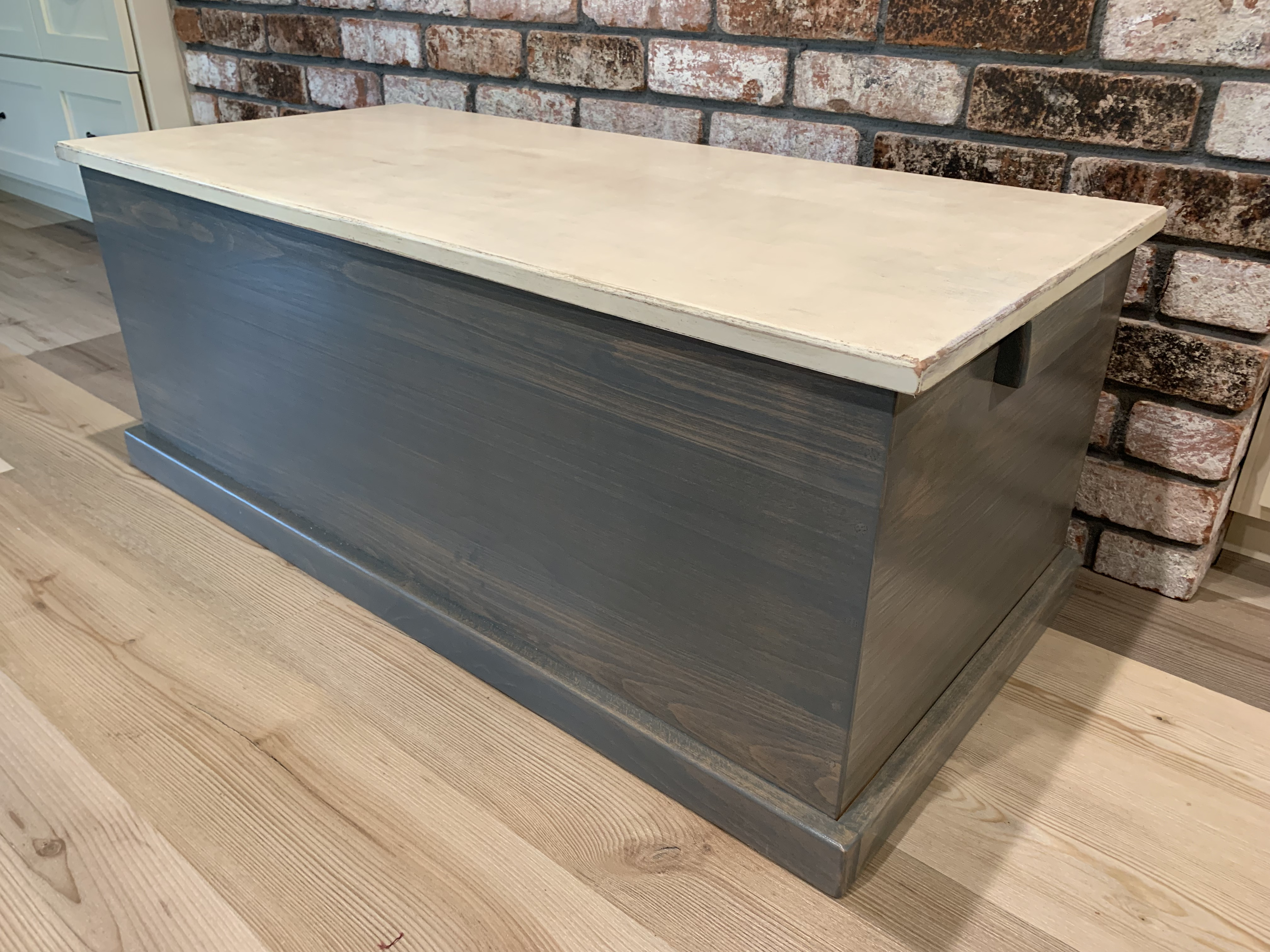
Rustic modern style blanket chest

== Usage ==
Perhaps the first use of the term "Rustic Modern" in popular culture came appeared in press following the burial of movie star Marilyn Monroe. On August 8, 1962, United Press International published an article regarding the services for the actress that stated, "thousands of spectators were expected to throng the area around the small 'rustic modern' chapel and mausoleum where the 36-year-old-actress will be entombed."

In 2000 author, Ali Hanan released a book entitled Modern Rustic: Natural Ideas for a Contemporary Lifestyle on the subject of the method of interior design in which he wrote that "creating the rustic modern look is an organic process that takes time and commitment. Some decorative touches ... may take some effort tracking down, but the end result is timeless".

The concept of Rustic Modern interior design received increased attention in 21th century, especially in the State of California. This incarnation of design includes design elements known as "kitsch", representing the 20th century trends such as chalkboards or twig racks alongside modern conveniences like reduced energy lighting and other state-of-the-art design elements.

== Spread ==
Between 2011 and 2012 the trend took off, particularly in the San Diego area, where a number of commercial establishments such as bars and restaurants have opted to redesign their properties according to the design style. This particular incarnation has been described by Kitchens Magazine as composed of "earth tones and light weight and/or sustainably harvested woods" that translate the idea that home owners do not "take themselves too seriously". The style trend began to spread outside of the California region and into the rest of the United States during the 2011-12 period, a movement most closely linked to the San Diego design firm Jackson Design & Remodeling—who won a 2011 American Society of Interior Designers Design Excellence Award for its work with this design approach.

Rustic Modern is used for both the new homes and the restoration of older homes.

== See also ==
- Cottagecore
- Distressing
- Industrial style
- Shabby chic
- Pastoral
- Rustic architecture
- Revivalism (architecture)
