= Greenville, Indiana =

- Town
- Town of Greenville
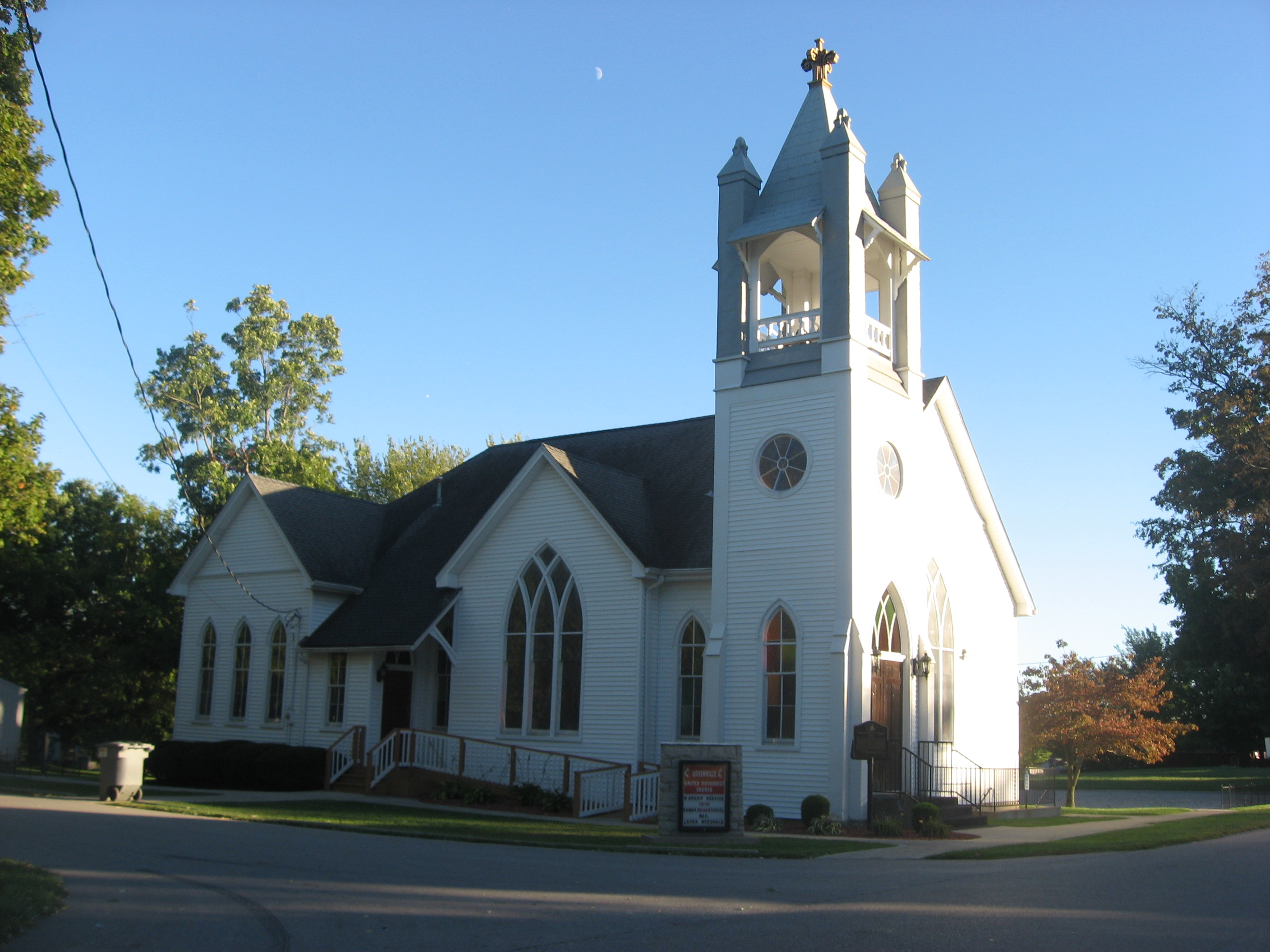

- Seal

- Location of Greenville in Floyd County, Indiana.
- Coordinates: 38°22′22″N 85°59′19″W
- Country: United States
- State: Indiana
- County: Floyd
- Township: Greenville

Area
  - Total: 0.90 sq mi (2.34 km^{2})
  - Land: 0.90 sq mi (2.34 km^{2})
  - Water: 0 sq mi (0.00 km^{2})
- Elevation: 827 ft (252 m)

Population (2020)
  - Total: 1,365
  - Density: 1,509.7/sq mi (582.88/km^{2})
- Time zone: UTC-5 (EST)
  - Summer (DST): UTC-4 (EDT)
- ZIP code: 47124
- Area codes: 812 & 930
- FIPS code: 18-29844
- GNIS feature ID: 0435458
- Website: visitgreenvillein.com

Greenville is an incorporated town in Floyd County, Indiana. As of the 2020 census, Greenville had a population of 1,365. Greenville is located in the greater Louisville metropolitan area.

== History ==
=== Founding ===
Greenville was platted in 1816 by Andrew Mundell and Benjamin Haines some three years before Floyd County was established. During the first three years of Greenville's development, the village was a part of Clark County.

=== Notable people ===
==== John Baptiste Ford ====
Captain John Baptiste Ford found his way to Greenville as a 14-year-old runaway from Danville, Kentucky. Ford began as an apprentice with his future father-in-law in the local saddle shop which led him into his first business venture. Ford purchased the Old Mill and saddle shop from its owner, added a grocery and began making tin pie safes which he sold throughout the country. Later, Ford moved to New Albany and established several businesses, and became the first man to succeed in making plate glass in the United States. That success was the precursor to several glass companies, most notably the Pittsburgh Plate Glass Company now known as PPG. Ford became the father of American plate glass.

That original building that housed the mill, saddle shop and grocery still stands today. Historically referred to as the Old Mill and Ford's Flour Mill, the Greenville Station is believed to be the oldest commercial building in Greenville. Construction on the original wooden structure began in 1810 and finished in 1812. In 1840, Ford helped to erect the present brick structure. Besides housing Ford's grocery and the saddle shop, the Old Mill was the Greenville Post Office from 1823 until the early 1940s when it was relocated to H. Miller's house at the corner of East First Street and Hwy 150. The Station was a stop for the 104-mile stagecoach route that ran from Falls Cities to the Wabash River. The building also served as a stop along the Pony Express route from 1861 to 1867. The Greenville Station served as lodge hall for two civil organizations: the fraternal order of the Free and Accepted Masons and the International Order of Oddfellows. Through a majority of the early 20th century, the Greenville Station was referred to by the townspeople as the "lodge building" or the "lodge."

Ford was on the board for the Floyd County Seminary from 1850 - 1852. Ford was a philanthropist and always gave back to the community even after he left Greenville. He paid for the construction of the Simpson Memorial United Methodist Church in 1899. In 2017, the Greenville Town Council named a road "John Baptiste Ford Drive" to honor Ford's history and significant contributions to both the community and industrialism. The Greenville Historic Preservation Commission had a historic marker approved by the Indiana Historic Bureau in 2019. The historic marker is the only John B. Ford specific historic marker in the country and the first IHB approved marker in Floyd County outside of New Albany.

=== Civil War ===

Morgan's Raid came through Greenville on July 10, 1863, led by Confederate General John Hunt Morgan. After the Battle of Corydon, Morgan sent a column of troops through Greenville. Confederate troops were reported east of Greenville, at eight o'clock, and some of the scouts burned the railroad bridge at Farrabee Station, fifteen miles further north, at ten o'clock.

Greenville resident Ephraim L. Girdner enlisted with the Union Army in 1861. He was captured by the Confederates during the Battle of Richmond in 1862, he was promoted to Captain of his regiment in 1864, and was also part of Sherman's March to the Sea engaging is several battles along the way. Much of Girdner's communications and military documents during the Civil War were preserved by his family and donated as the "Girdner Papers" to the library at Emory University in Atlanta.

=== County Seat ===
Early in Floyd County's history, Greenville was initially to be the county seat. It was proposed that either New Albany or Greenville would become the county seat. The contest was left up to who could make the largest donation. The contest was animated but New Albany added the donation of a bell for the court house. The offer of the bell was irresistible and vanquished Greenville from the contest.

=== Incorporation ===
Greenville was surveyed by George Smith, county surveyor, and incorporated October 28, 1879.

=== Fire of 1908 ===
On March 26, 1908, a fire destroyed most of the town's original buildings. Today, the Station stands just two doors from one of the city's oldest home (rebuilt in 1908), which still boasts some of John B. Ford's original plate glass works.

=== The Town Flag ===
The Greenville Town Flag was designed by Glenn Burkhart in 1969, then just a 5th grader at Greenville Elementary School. The design was part of a contest held by the Greenville Town Council and the Greenville Park Board. Glenn received a $25 bond as a prize for winning the contest. His original drawing and the original flag from 1969 have been preserved. The Greenville Historic Preservation Commission held a flag re-dedication ceremony in January 2019 for the Flag's 50-year anniversary.

=== Churches ===
The Simpson Memorial United Methodist Church was listed on the National Register of Historic Places in 2004.

== Notable Residents/Popular Culture ==
- Norman Jay Colman In 1850, Colman became the first principal in Greenville. First Secretary of Agriculture in 1889.
- John Baptiste Ford lived in Greenville from 1825 to 1854. After leaving Greenville, Ford went on to become an influential industrialist.
- Roscoe Miller was a pitcher with the Detroit Tigers, New York Giants, and Pittsburgh Pirates.

- The town was the setting for an episode of Poker Face (tv series) .

== Historic buildings ==
- Simpson Memorial United Methodist Church It was designed by church plan catalog architect Benjamin D. Price and built by Capt. John Nafius in 1899. It was listed on the National Register of Historic Places on September 29, 2004.
- Jersey Park Farm is a historic home and farm located just on the outskirts of Greenville. The farmhouse was built about 1875, and consists of a two-story, Federal style rectangular section with a two-story round section and one-story round section. It was listed on the National Register of Historic Places in 1984.
- The Station was built in 1840 by John Baptiste Ford and is the oldest commercial building in town.

== Geography ==
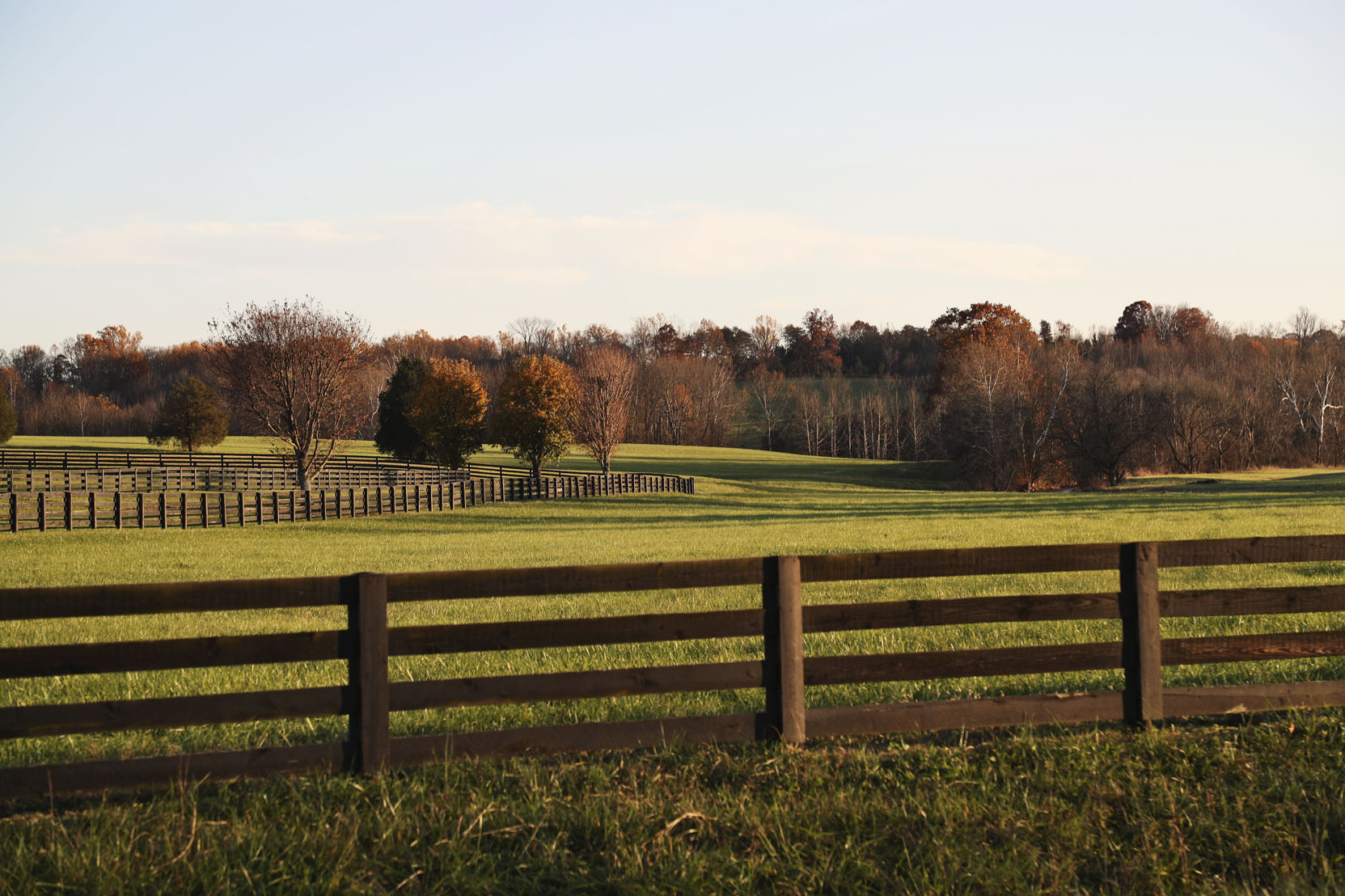

According to the 2010 census, Greenville has a total area of 0.78 square miles (2.02 km^{2}), all land.

The township is situated such that, clockwise, it borders the township of Jackson Township, Washington County to the northwest, Wood Township, Clark County to the northeast, Laffayette Township in Floyd County to the east, Georgetown Township to the south, Jackson Township, Harrison County to the southwest, and Morgan Township, Harrison County to the west.

Big and Little Indian Creeks meander through the township, which are tributaries in the Ohio River watershed.

== Demographics ==
Historical population
Census	Pop.	Note	%±
1880	394		—
1890	313		−20.6%
1900	309		−1.3%
1910	227		−26.5%
1920	225		−0.9%
1930	257		14.2%
1940	285		10.9%
1950	298		4.6%
1960	453		52.0%
1970	611		34.9%
1980	537		−12.1%
1990	508		−5.4%
2000	591		16.3%
2010	595		0.7%
2020	1,365		129.4%
U.S. Decennial Census

=== 2020 census ===
As of the 2020 census, Greenville had a population of 1,365. The median age was 34.4 years. 29.4% of residents were under the age of 18 and 11.6% of residents were 65 years of age or older. For every 100 females there were 88.5 males, and for every 100 females age 18 and over there were 85.7 males age 18 and over.

0.0% of residents lived in urban areas, while 100.0% lived in rural areas.

There were 483 households in Greenville, of which 48.9% had children under the age of 18 living in them. Of all households, 56.7% were married-couple households, 10.6% were households with a male householder and no spouse or partner present, and 25.3% were households with a female householder and no spouse or partner present. About 17.4% of all households were made up of individuals and 7.6% had someone living alone who was 65 years of age or older.

There were 498 housing units, of which 3.0% were vacant. The homeowner vacancy rate was 1.0% and the rental vacancy rate was 8.2%.

Racial composition as of the 2020 census
Race	Number	Percent
White	1,233	90.3%
Black or African American	24	1.8%
American Indian and Alaska Native	3	0.2%
Asian	23	1.7%
Native Hawaiian and Other Pacific Islander	0	0.0%
Some other race	12	0.9%
Two or more races	70	5.1%
Hispanic or Latino (of any race)	22	1.6%

=== 2010 census ===
As of the census of 2010, there were 595 people, 219 households, and 162 families residing in the town. The population density was 762.8 inhabitants per square mile (294.5/km^{2}). There were 241 housing units at an average density of 309.0 per square mile (119.3/km^{2}). The racial makeup of the town was 95.5% White, 1.5% African American, 0.8% Native American, 0.8% Asian, 0.5% from other races, and 0.8% from two or more races. Hispanic or Latino of any race were 2.0% of the population.

There were 219 households, of which 40.6% had children under the age of 18 living with them, 56.6% were married couples living together, 11.9% had a female householder with no husband present, 5.5% had a male householder with no wife present, and 26.0% were non-families. 18.3% of all households were made up of individuals, and 8.3% had someone living alone who was 65 years of age or older. The average household size was 2.72 and the average family size was 3.12.

The median age in the town was 40.3 years. 77% of residents were over the age of 18; 6.4% were between the ages of 20 and 24; 26.5% were from 25 to 44; 25.7% were from 45 to 64; and 14.7% were 65 years of age or older. The gender makeup of the town was 46.8% male and 53.2% female.

=== 2000 census ===
As of the census of 2000, there were 591 people, 224 households, and 174 families residing in the town. The population density was 954.9 inhabitants per square mile (368.7/km^{2}). There were 238 housing units at an average density of 384.6 per square mile (148.5/km^{2}). The racial makeup of the town was 97.12% White, 0.34% African American, 1.02% Asian, 0.51% from other races, and 1.02% from two or more races. Hispanic or Latino of any race were 0.51% of the population.

There were 224 households, out of which 39.3% had children under the age of 18 living with them, 65.2% were married couples living together, 8.0% had a female householder with no husband present, and 22.3% were non-families. 19.6% of all households were made up of individuals, and 11.6% had someone living alone who was 65 years of age or older. The average household size was 2.64 and the average family size was 3.03.

In the town, the population was spread out, with 28.4% under the age of 18, 4.4% from 18 to 24, 31.3% from 25 to 44, 23.5% from 45 to 64, and 12.4% who were 65 years of age or older. The median age was 37 years. For every 100 females, there were 101.0 males. For every 100 females age 18 and over, there were 96.7 males.

The median income for a household in the town was $49,271, and the median income for a family was $50,972. Males had a median income of $44,464 versus $26,484 for females. The per capita income for the town was $24,343. About 5.0% of families and 4.0% of the population were below the poverty line, including 2.1% of those under age 18 and 15.7% of those age 65 or over.

== Education ==
The community is within the New Albany-Floyd County Consolidated School Corporation. Greenville is within the attendance boundaries of Greenville Elementary School, Highland Hills Middle School, and Floyd Central High School.

Greenville Elementary School is located within the town limits.
