= Simpson Memorial United Methodist Church (Greenville, Indiana) =

Historic church in Indiana, United States

- U.S. National Register of Historic Places
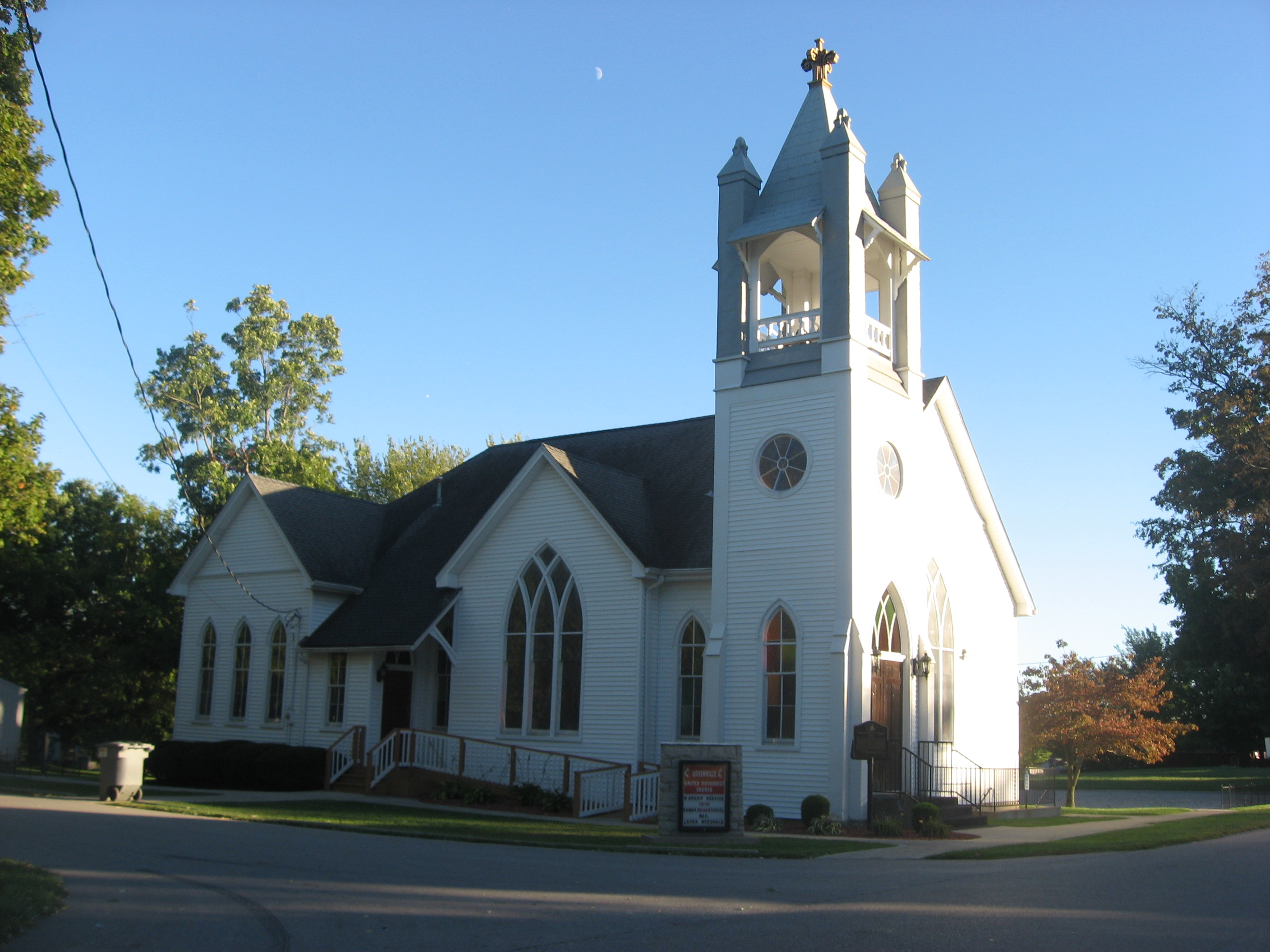
- Front and side of the church

- Location within Indiana Location within the United States
- Location: 9449 Harrison St., Greenville, Indiana
- Coordinates: 38°22′23″N 85°59′29″W
- Area: less than one acre
- Built: 1899
- Architect: Benjamin D. Price, Captain John Nafius
- Architectural style: Gothic, Akron Plan
- NRHP reference No.: 04001098
- Added to NRHP: September 29, 2004

The Simpson Memorial United Methodist Church is a historic United Methodist church located at Greenville, Indiana. It was designed by church plan catalogue architect Benjamin D. Price and built by Capt. John Nafius in 1899. It is a frame Gothic Revival style church built on the Akron Plan and topped by a hipped and gable roof. It features lancet windows and a corner bell tower topped with four square piers sheathed in tin.

It was listed on the National Register of Historic Places in 2004.
