= Allan Gorman =

American painter (born 1947)

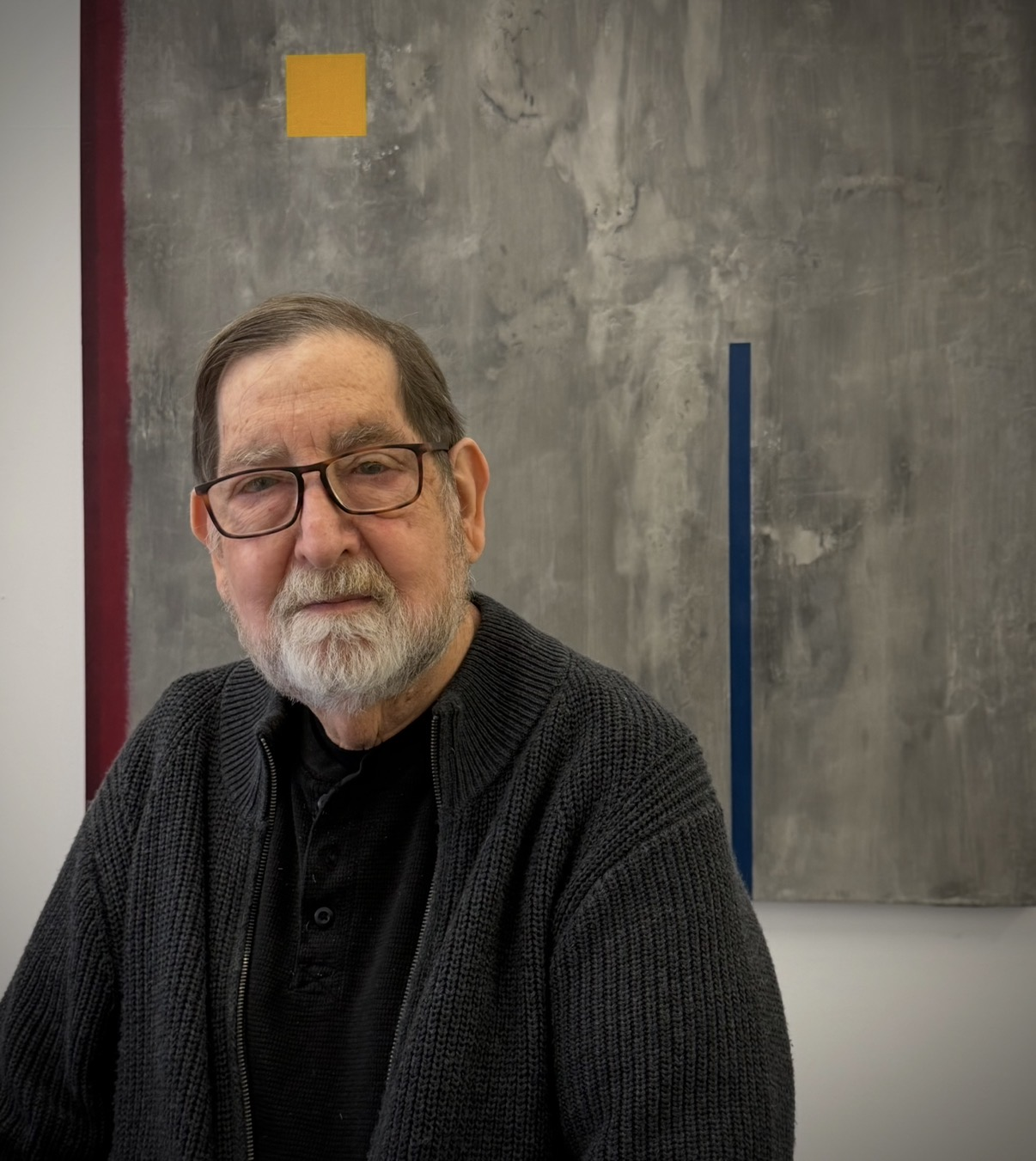
Allan Gorman, contemporary painter

Allan Gorman (1947 - ) is a structure-driven contemporary painter from Brooklyn, NY, known for his oblique studies of urban undersides, and his non-representational spatial compositions. His work has evolved from meticulous photorealism to urban geometric abstraction. The artist admits a predilection for intersecting edges, converging lights, colors, surfaces, and textures. His art has been widely exhibited in galleries and museums throughout the United States and also in Europe. He is a former advertising executive, brand marketing educator, and consultant. He is currently based in Jersey City, NJ.

== Career ==
=== Painting ===
He began painting in the early 1980s while teaching at the School of Visual Arts in New York City. His art has progressively evolved from an initial photorealistic period through several phases that have been described as industrialist, architectural, and abstractionist. His work has been profiled in The Huffington Post, Transportation Today, Manifest's International, New Painting Annual, America Art Collector, Poets & Artists Magazine, Chicago Fine Art, and many other specialized publications and websites. Since 2019, one of his pieces has been part of the collection at the European Museum of Modern Art. A list of Gorman's acknowledged art teachers includes Power Booth, Gary Godbee, and David Kapp. Interviews of the artist are available online.

=== Curatorial ===
He has often participated in art events and societies as a curator, a juror, or a board member. In 2017 he was a curator of the exhibition "Industrialism in the 21st Century", at the Nicole Longnecker Gallery, Houston, TX.

=== Branding ===
Largely self-taught, Gorman began his art career in 1970, working in the advertising industry, eventually founding his own firm in 1987. During his career in branding (1970–2006), he worked at advertising agencies such as Young & Rubicam, Grey Advertising, Foote, Cone & Belding and others. He opened his own advertising shop in 1987. He was a past president of the Art Directors Club of NJ. In 2007 he was inducted into the New Jersey Advertising Club's Hall of Fame. Details of Gorman's career in branding are found in the May 4, 2015, issue of Motorcycle Magazine.

== Recent Awards ==
- 2025 Fortheartist one year fellowship
- 2022 Individual Artist Fellowship Recipient for Painting - New Jersey State Council on the Arts
- 2022 Best in Show - Grey Cube Gallery Online Exhibit
- 2021 First Place Award - J Mane Gallery Cityscape
- 2020 Architectural Artist of the Year - ADC Gallery's Art
- 2020 Pioneer of Realism Award - Spring Salon Online Exhibition, International Guild of Realism
- 2018 Best in Show - Fusion Art 3rd Annual Cityscape Competition
- 2015 - Still Life Artist of the Year - ADC Art Comes Alive!
- 2014 - Masterworks Museum Tour from the International Guild of Realism
- 2014 - John Collins Memorial Award for an Oil Painting - American Artists Professional League
- 2013 - New Jersey State Council on the Arts fellowship for Painting
- 2013 - Honorable Mention - WINNER'S GALLERY

== Memberships ==
- American Artists Professional League
- Studio Montclair
- International Guild of Realism
- Grandmasters of Fine Art

== Gallery ==
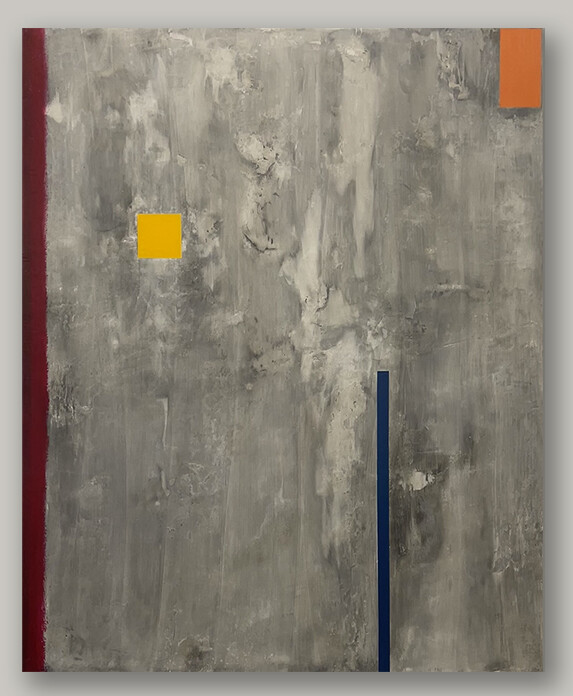
A Concrete Conclusion (2025), oil on linen, 57 x 44 inch

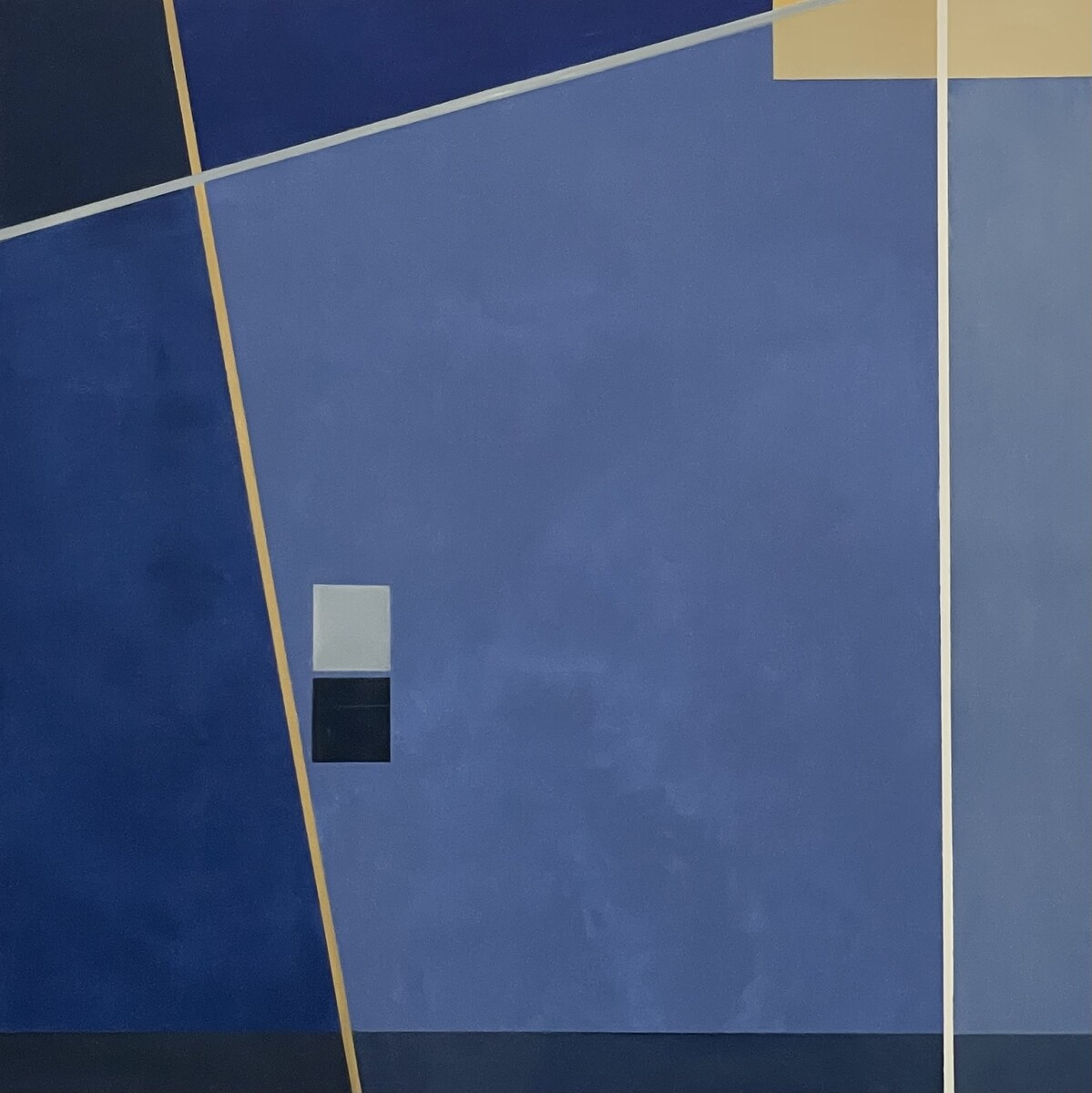
Midnight in Harlem Oil on Cradled Panel, 30x30 inch

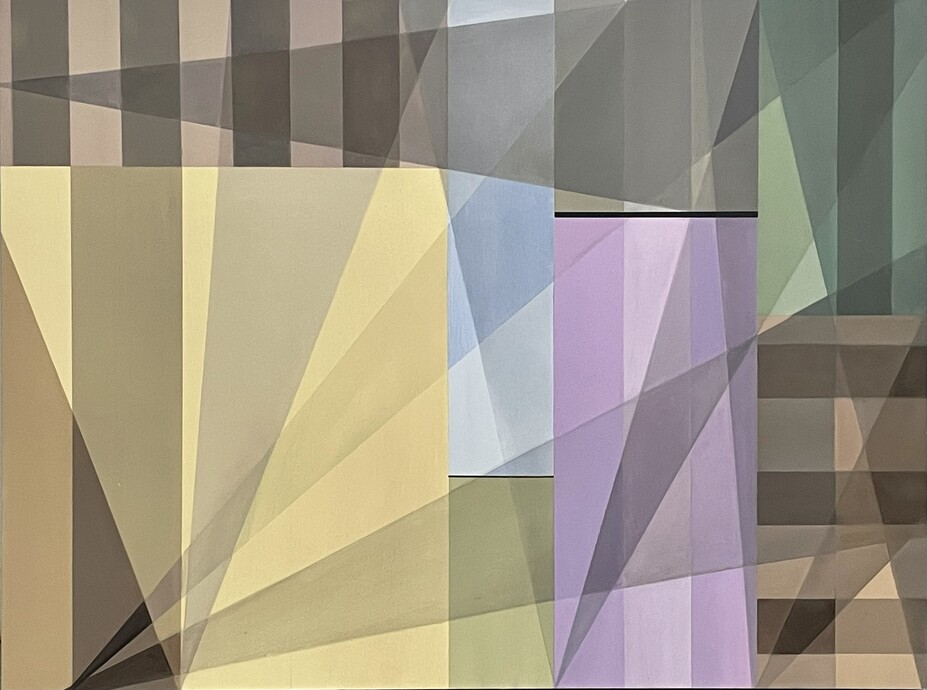
Metropolis Oil on Cradled Panel, 36x48 inch

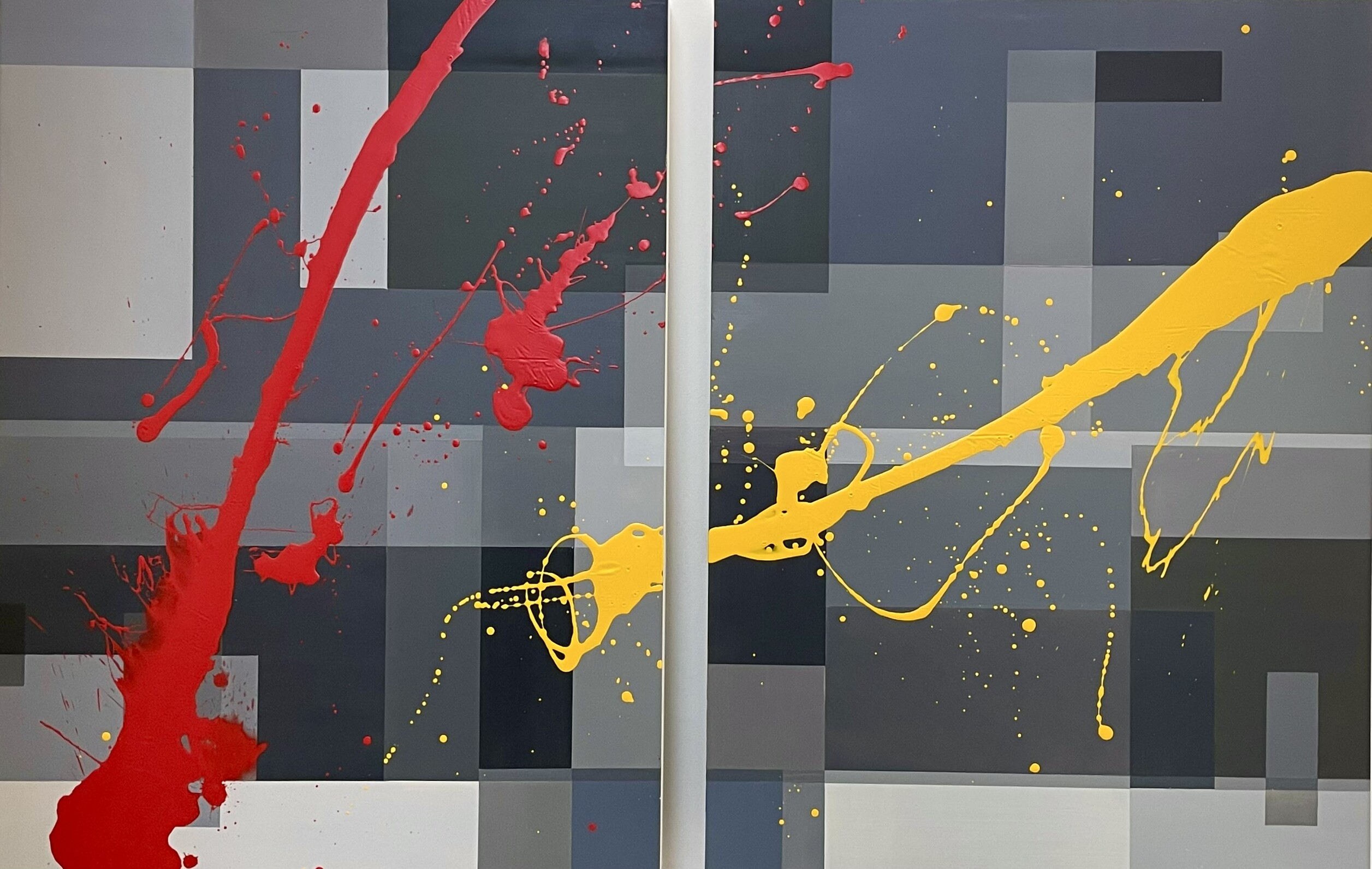
50 Shades of Grey with a Felony Violation Oil and Enamel on Cradled Panel, 30x60 inch (2 panels)

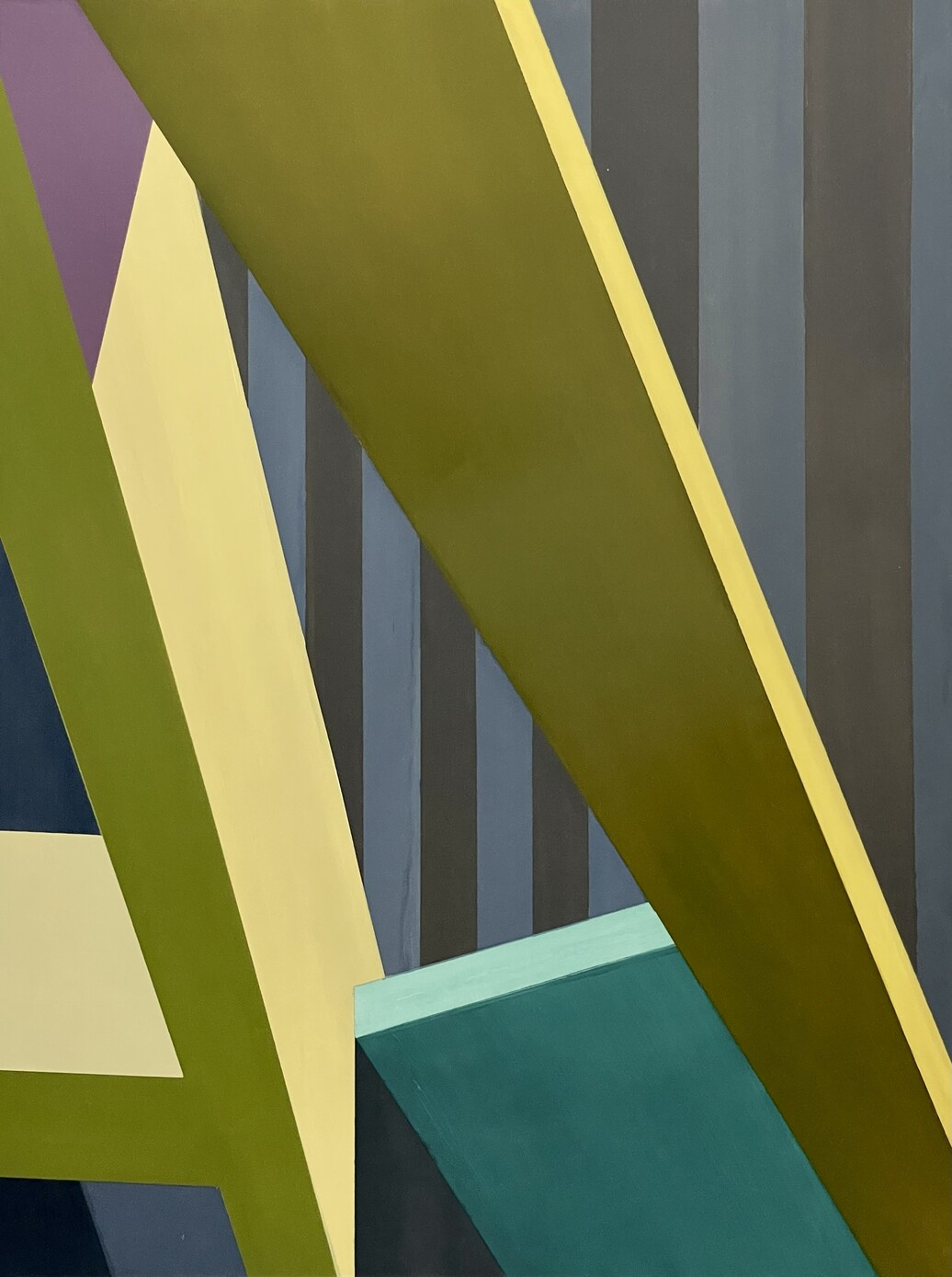
Elevated Highways at Dusk Oil on Cradled Panel, 48x36 inch

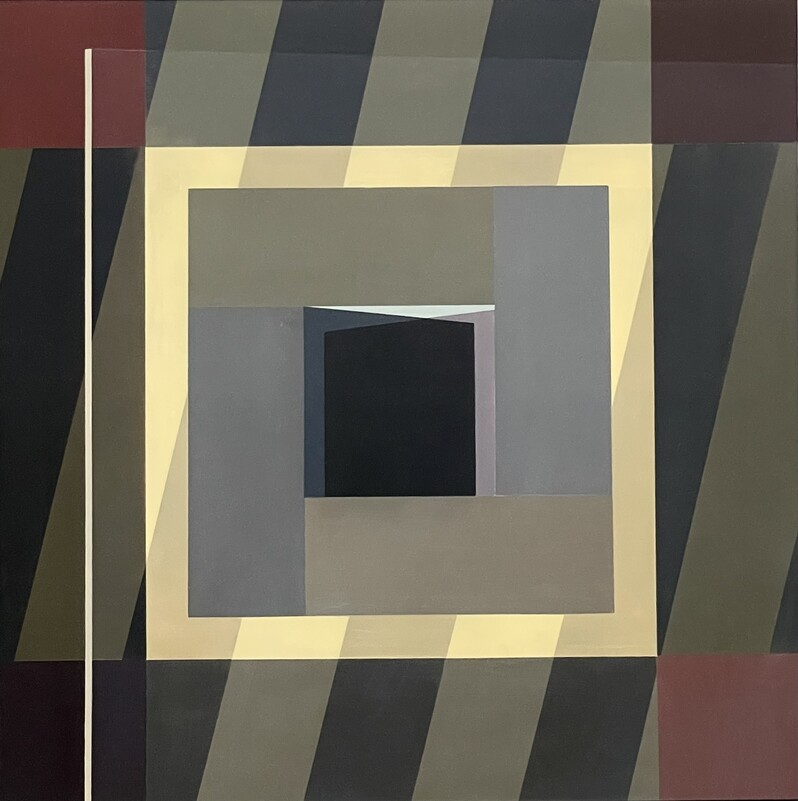
The Portal to the Other Side Oil on Cradled Panel, 30x30 inch
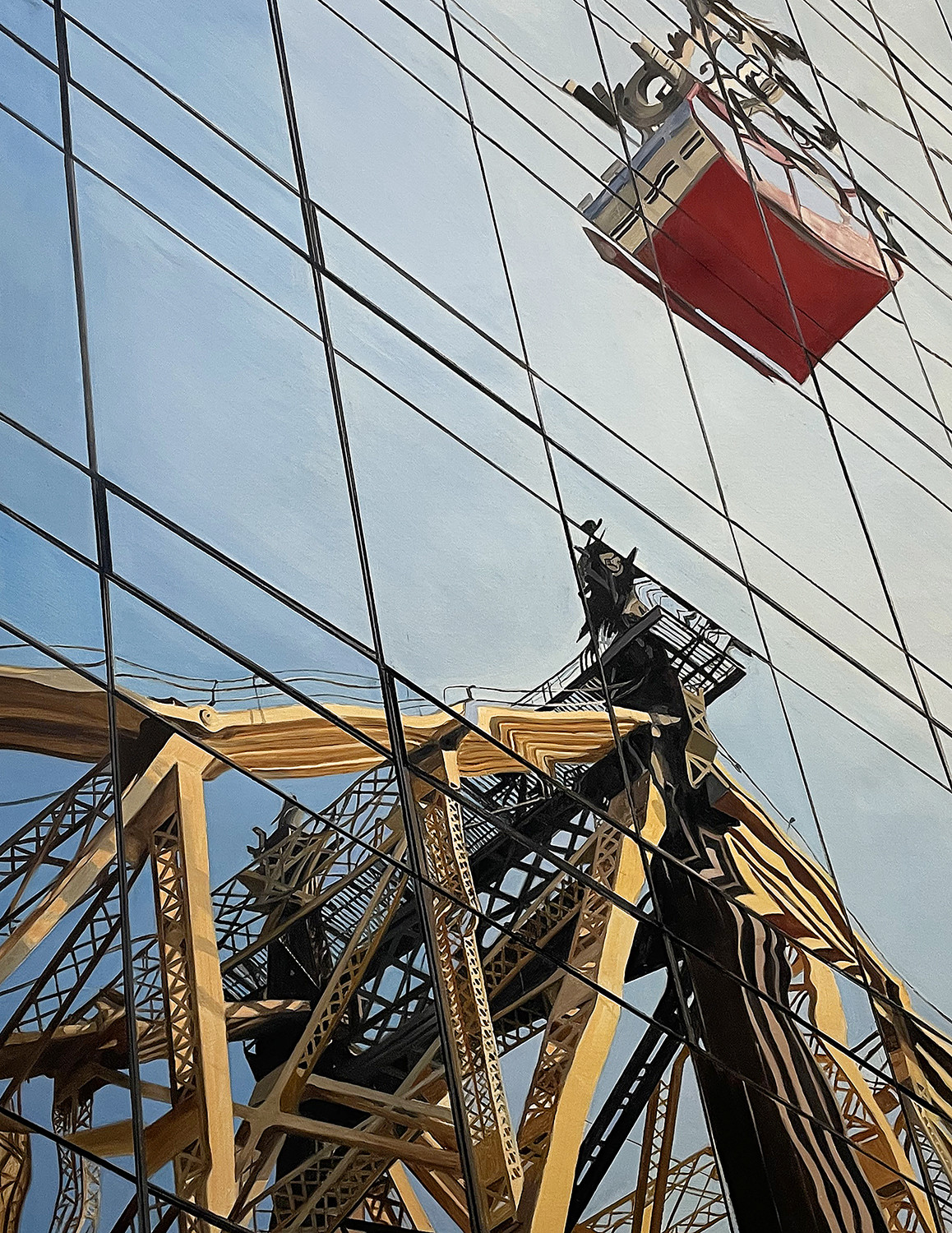
59th Street Bridge and Tram (2022), oil on linen, 57 x 44 inch

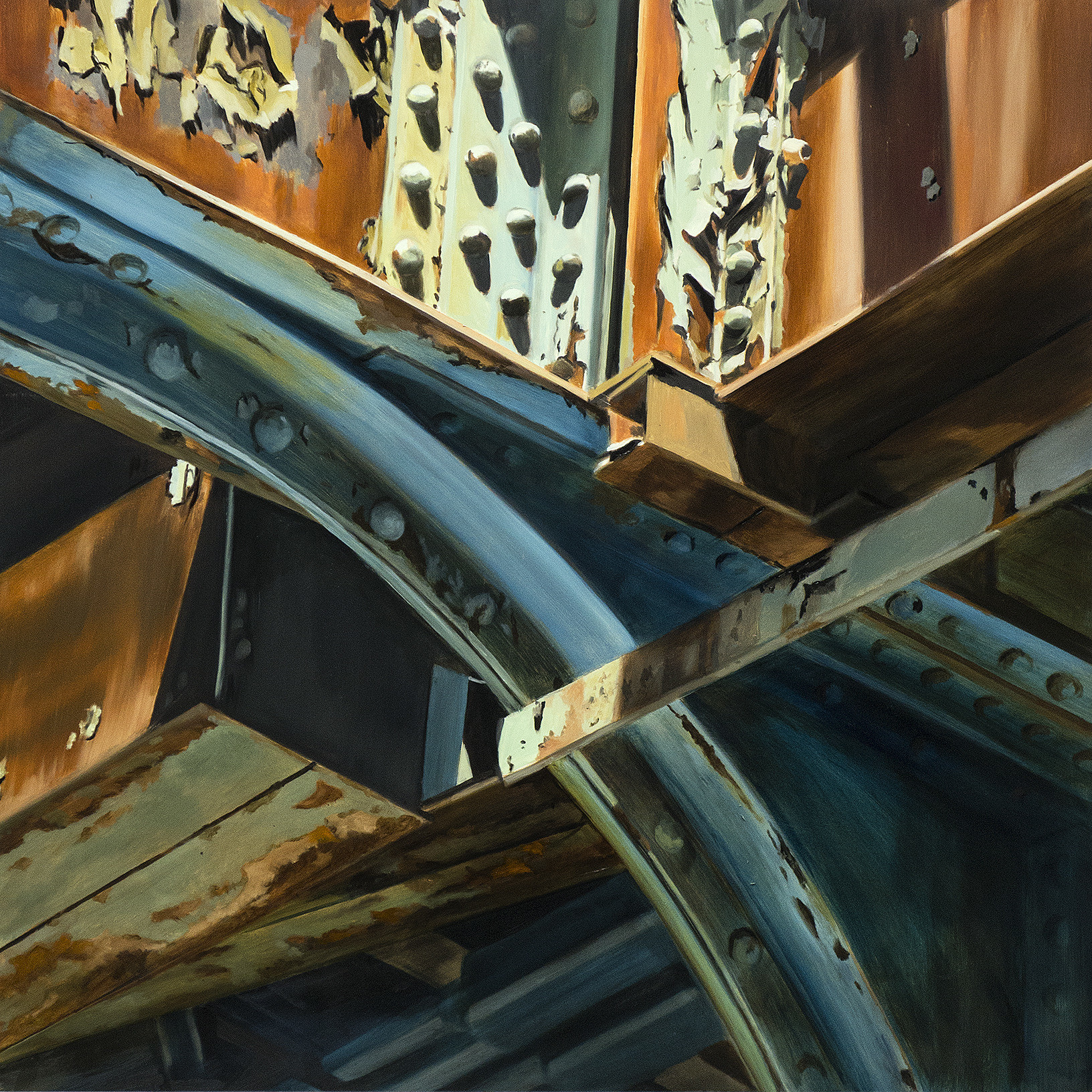
Culver Line Rust (2019), oil on panel, 30 x 30 inch

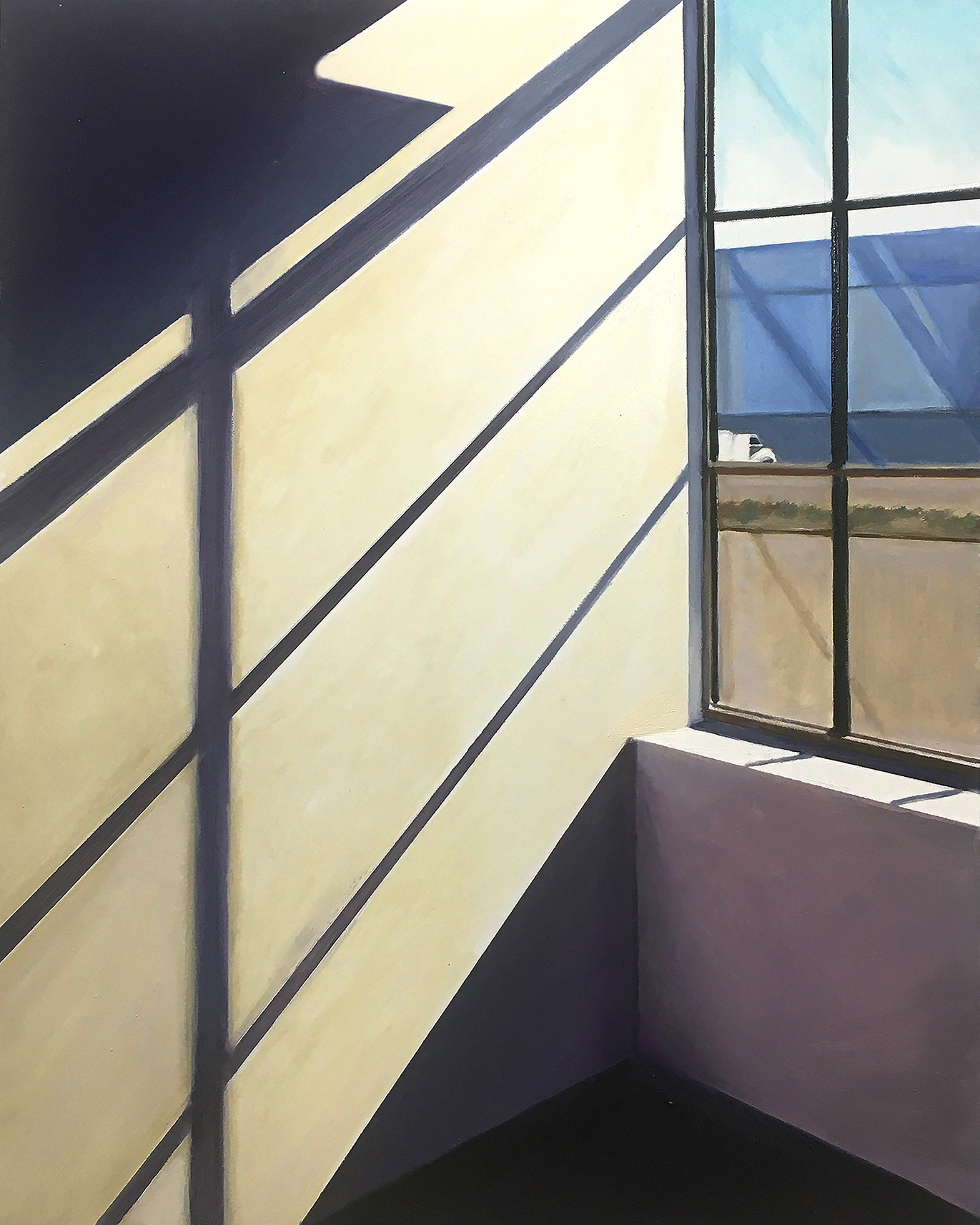
Shadows at Kearny Point (2020), oil on panel, 20 x 16 inch

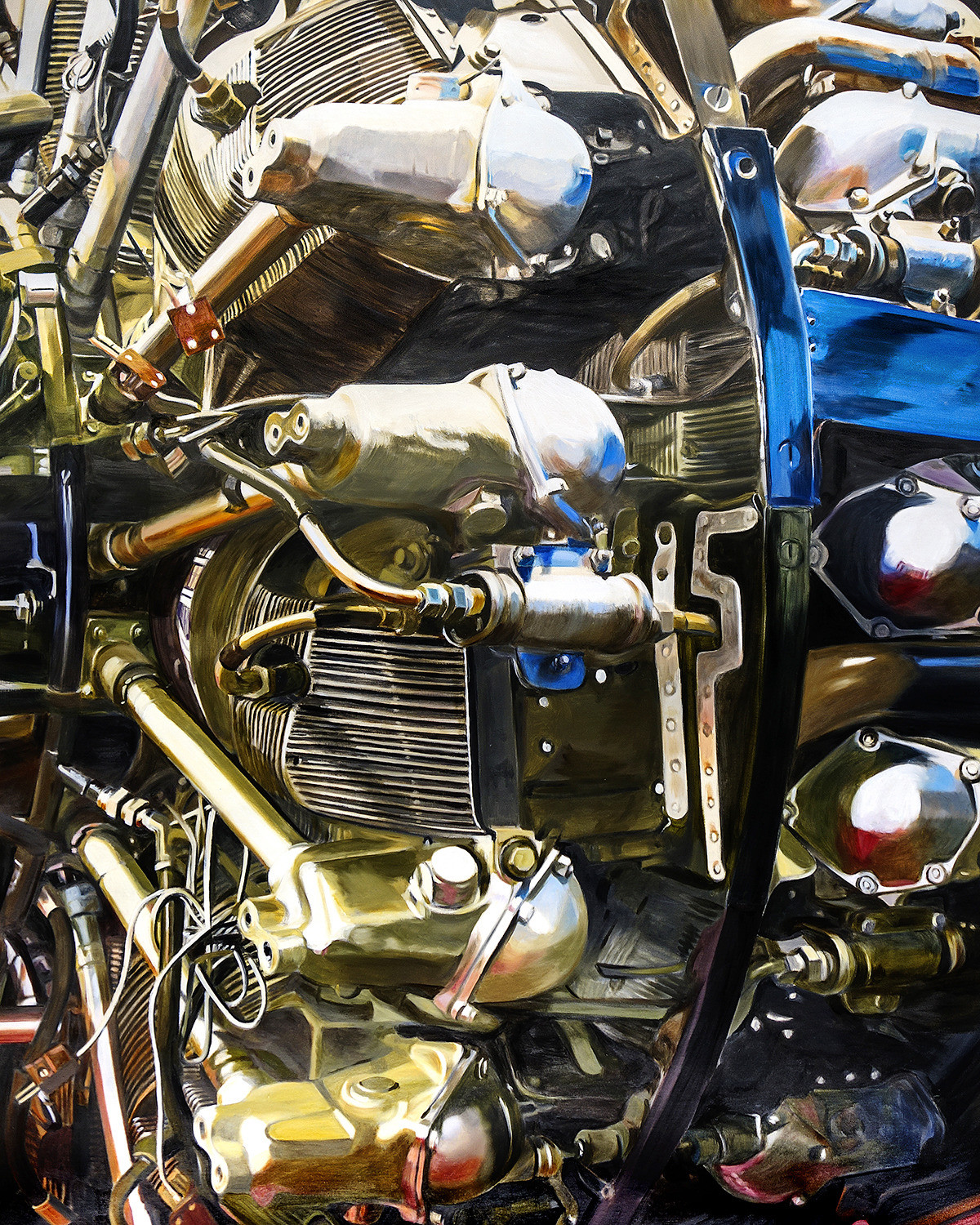
Whirlwind (2018), oil on linen, 59 x 47 inch

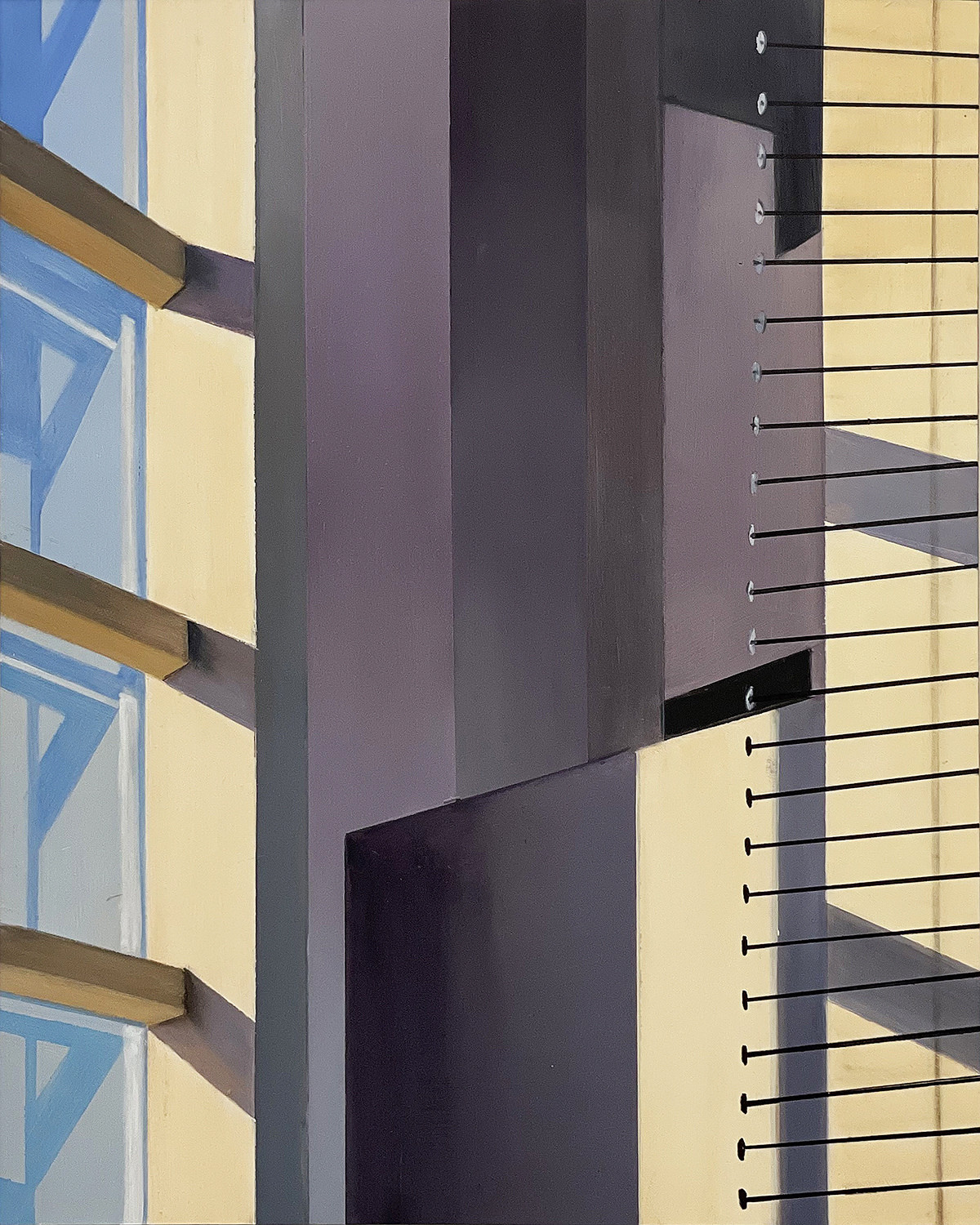
Windows, Shadows, and a Mobile (2021), oil on panel, 20 x 16 inch

ROCKET (2015), Oil on Linen, 104 x 74 inch

== Books ==
- Ten Marketing Secrets for Building a Sexier Brand

- Briefs for Building Better Brands: Tips, Parables and Insights for Market Leaders

== Exhibitions ==
=== At Museums ===
- 2018 - Daytona Museum of Arts and Sciences, Daytona Beach, FL
- 2018 - Dane G. Hansen Museum, Logan, KS
- 2019 - Saginaw Art Museum - Saginaw, MI
- 2022 - Deusenberg Automobile Museum - Auburn, IN
- 2022 - The Museum of the Rockies, Bozeman, MT
- 2023 - Arnot Art Museum, Elmira, NY
- 2024 - MEAM, European Museum of Modern Art, Barcelona, Spain
- 2025 - Las Cruces Museum of Art, Las Cruces, NM

=== Solo shows ===
- 2010 Events in NJ, Montclair, NJ
- 2012 at the Sussex County Community College Art Gallery
- 2013 at The Galleries at Hillside Square, Montclair, NJ
- 2018 at Art in the Atrium, Morristown, NJ
- 2018 at the County College of Morris, NJ
- 2022 32nd Annual Jersey City Art & Studio Tour
- 2025 Fine Arts Gallery at St. Peter’s University

== Critique ==
- 2023 - Hajra Salinas - ..an astute knack for discerning the abstract concepts embedded within everyday urban..
- 2023 - Lorena Kloosterboer - eye-catching compositions that vary from striking panoramas to intriguing close-ups
- 2025 - Angela Li - a career that continually challenges boundaries and embraces evolution
