= Industrial style =

Aesthetic trend in interior design of the 21st century

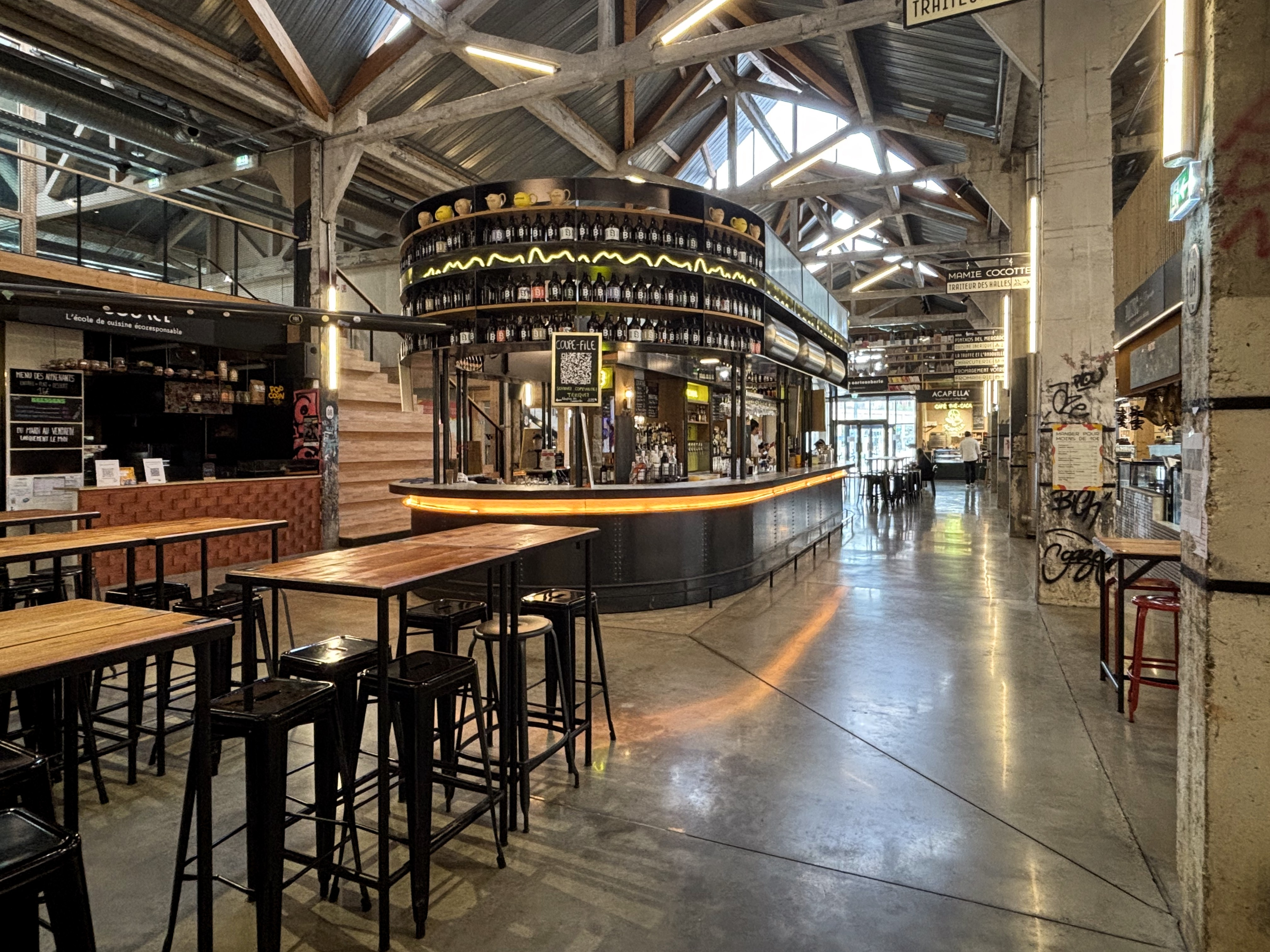
A food court in Toulouse

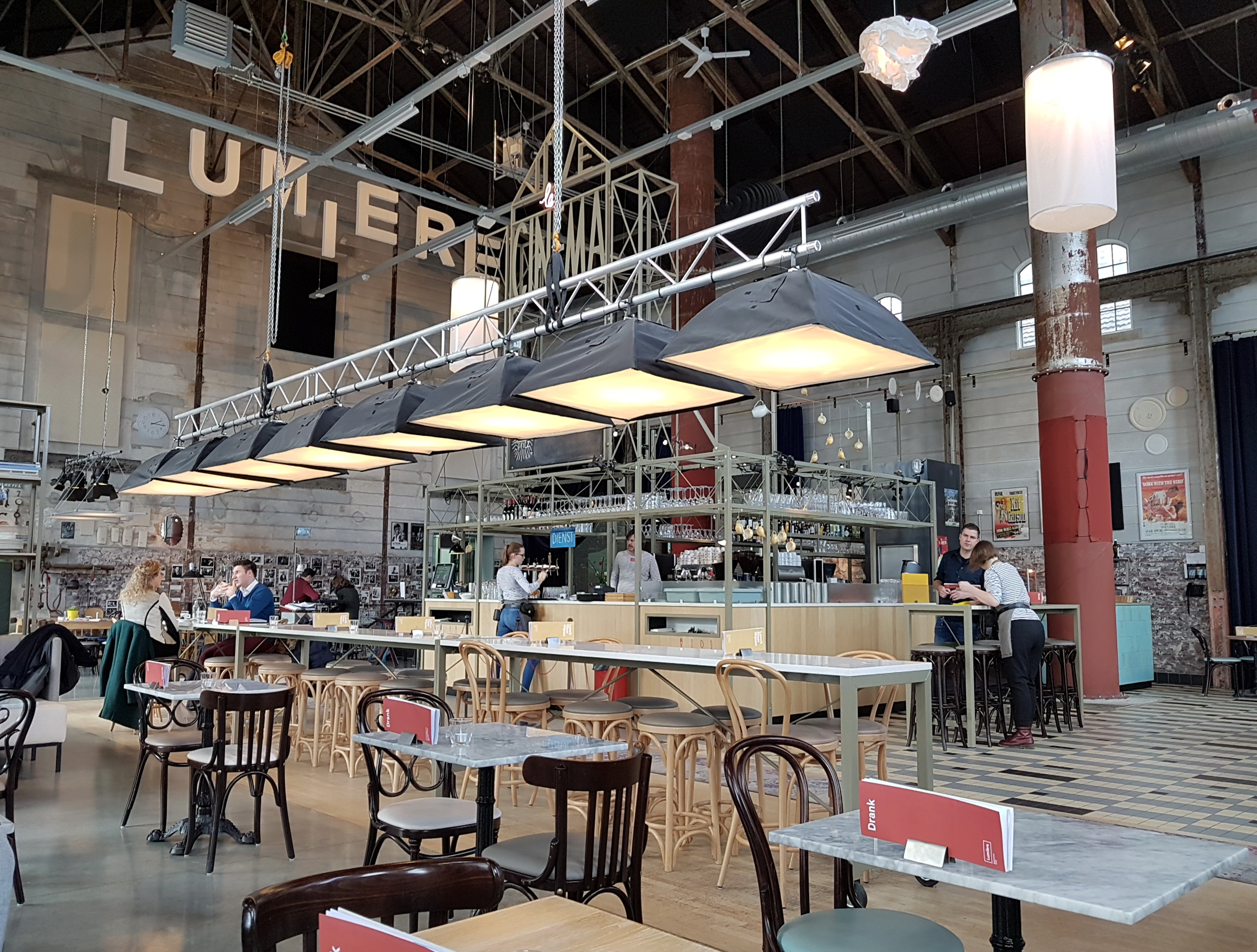
Lumière Cinema in Maastricht

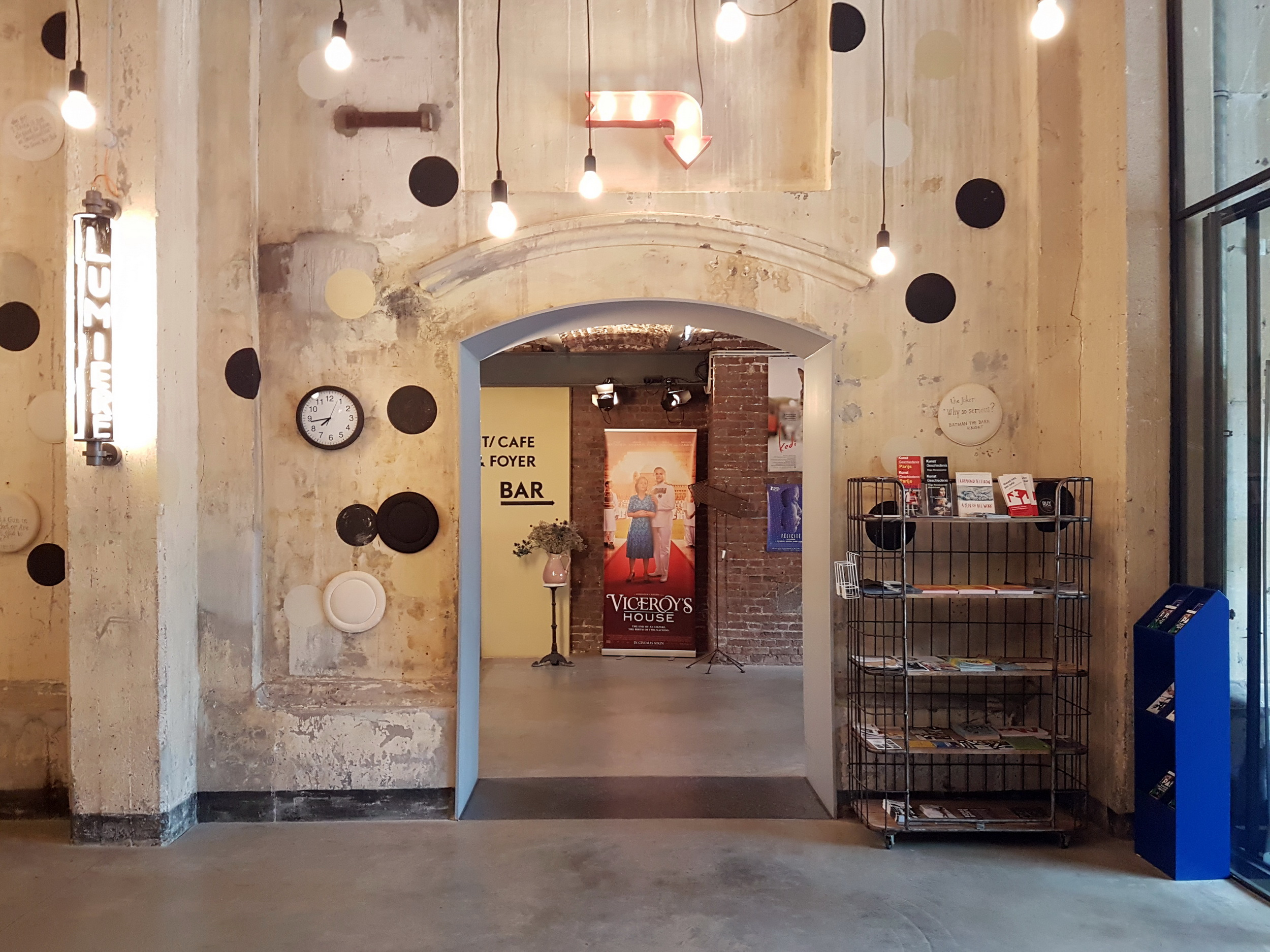
Lumière Cinema in Maastricht

Industrial style or industrial chic refers to an aesthetic trend in interior design that takes cues from old factories and industrial spaces that in recent years have been converted to lofts and other living spaces. Since its outset as an aesthetic style in the 1920s, Industrialism as a style has grown wider to include industrial features in several art disciplines, including architecture, visual arts, and even cinema.

== History ==
Emerging as an outcome of the industrial revolution and legitimized by the Exposition Internationale des Arts Décoratifs et Industriels Modernes, industrial style became a trend in the second half of the 20th century. The style was also termed Art Deco in the 1960s, echoing the name of the Parisian event. This aesthetic has gained acceptance since then, remaining popular beyond the 2010s.

== Interiors ==
Components of industrial style include weathered wood, building systems, exposed brick, industrial lighting fixtures, and concrete. Industrial style can also be seen in the use of unexpected materials used in building. Shipping containers are now being used in architecture for homes and commercial spaces. The industrial style of design is most commonly found in urban areas, including cities and lofts. These are prime locations because they provide almost a blank space for homeowners to get started with a fresh canvas. Such locations also contain some of the key elements used to achieve this style of design including exposed bricks, and pipes, concrete flooring, and large open windows. These elements help give the space a “warehouse” feel, which is the ultimate goal of this style of design. This style incorporates raw materials to give the space an unfinished look.

To achieve an industrial feel, a natural color palette is most commonly used. A mix of grays, neutrals, and rustic colors can be seen in these spaces. These simple colors allow for the use of furniture and other accessories to help liven up the room. Also, having the walls a neutral color allows for open areas like lofts to feel bigger and more connected while giving furniture the opportunity to help create a natural flow of the room.

Large sectionals are a staple item in any industrial-style room. This is because of their ability to help close off larger spaces and help divide up the living areas. This is important because spaces like lofts tend to be very open. In order to create the illusion of multiple rooms, a sectional can help block the flow and define a separate living area.

As far as lighting goes, floor lamps are trending. Any light fixture with metal finishes fits right into this style. Large open windows also help bring natural light into the space, which can be very beneficial for smaller spaces. Overhead light fixtures can also give the area an industrial ambiance, especially in the kitchen.

To tie into the industrial theme, many homeowners resort to a kitchen island. These islands tend to be made of reclaimed wood or other earthy materials. A kitchen island can also contribute to separating a big room and providing a defined kitchen area. They can be paired with barstools that are made of wood or contain metal finishes. Open-faced shelving and storage are big hits when it comes to an industrial kitchen. Free-standing metal racks can also provide extra storage and can be beneficial in smaller rooms. If they have wheels, they can multitask. For example, low shelving on wheels can serve as a computer desk one day; the next day it can stand-in as a bar cart. Exposed overhead beams, brick and concrete are notable accents to the kitchen, along with darker cabinets and shelving. Lighter colored floors or polished concrete are ways to incorporate this style into any kitchen. To modernize this rather rustic look, decorative tiles look great in the kitchen. Tile as a backsplash can help create a modern twist and help liven up the space.

== Architecture ==
Having originated from the adaptive reuse of old, primarily industrial buildings, industrial style has played an important role in urban regeneration in many cities, serving to revitalize decaying neighborhoods, promoting investment, and avoiding unnecessary urban expansion. The city of London is a particularly conspicuous example of the latter phenomenon.

== Industrialist art ==
=== Painting ===
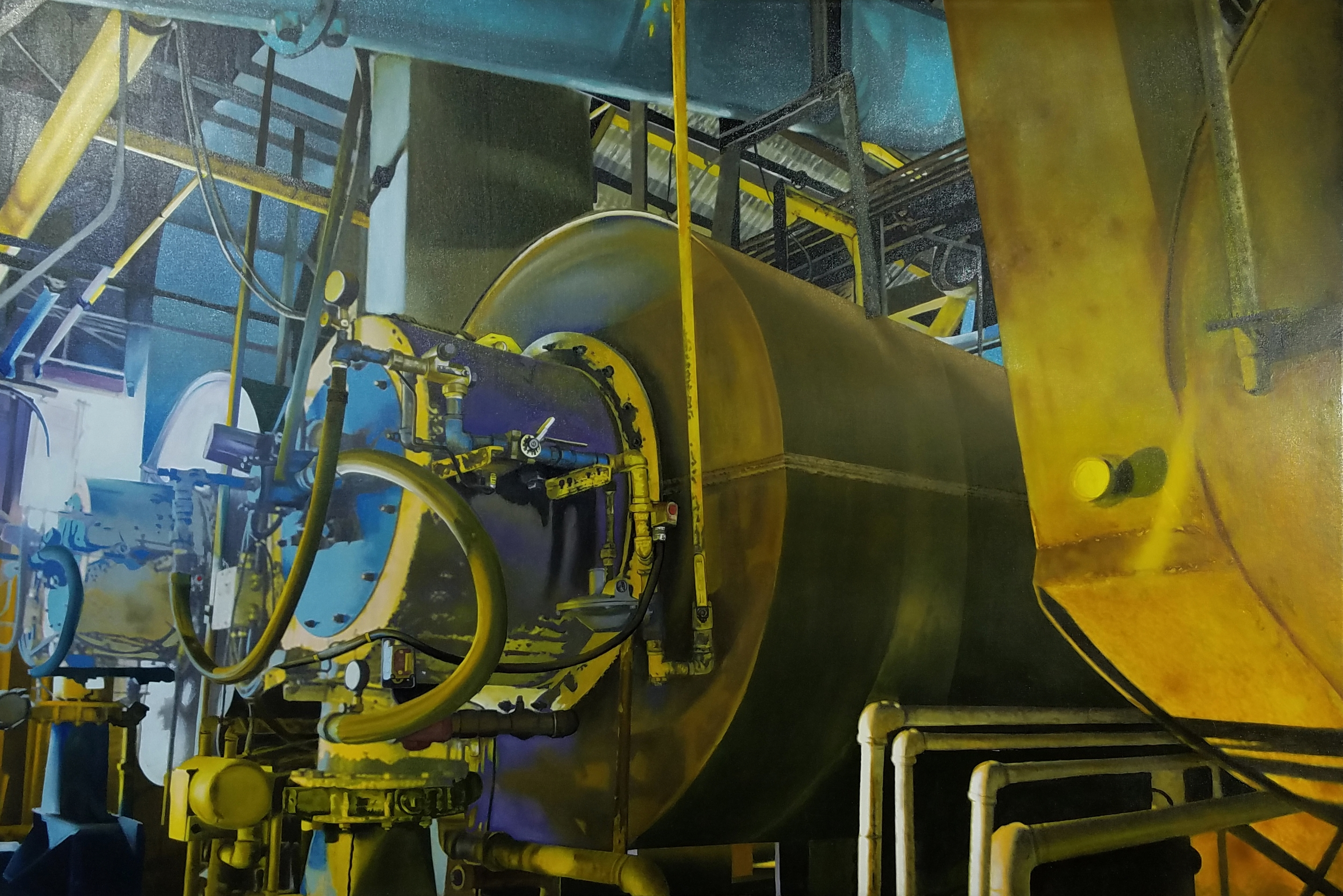
Pressure #1, Oil on canvas by Jan A. Nelson

Often merged with Precisionism, industrial style painting is found in modern artists including Charles DeMuth, Robert Delaunay, Charles Sheeler, Jan Nelson, Don Eddy, Allan Gorman, Roland Kulla, Jeffrey Milstein, Andrew More, and Chris Klein

=== Sculpture ===
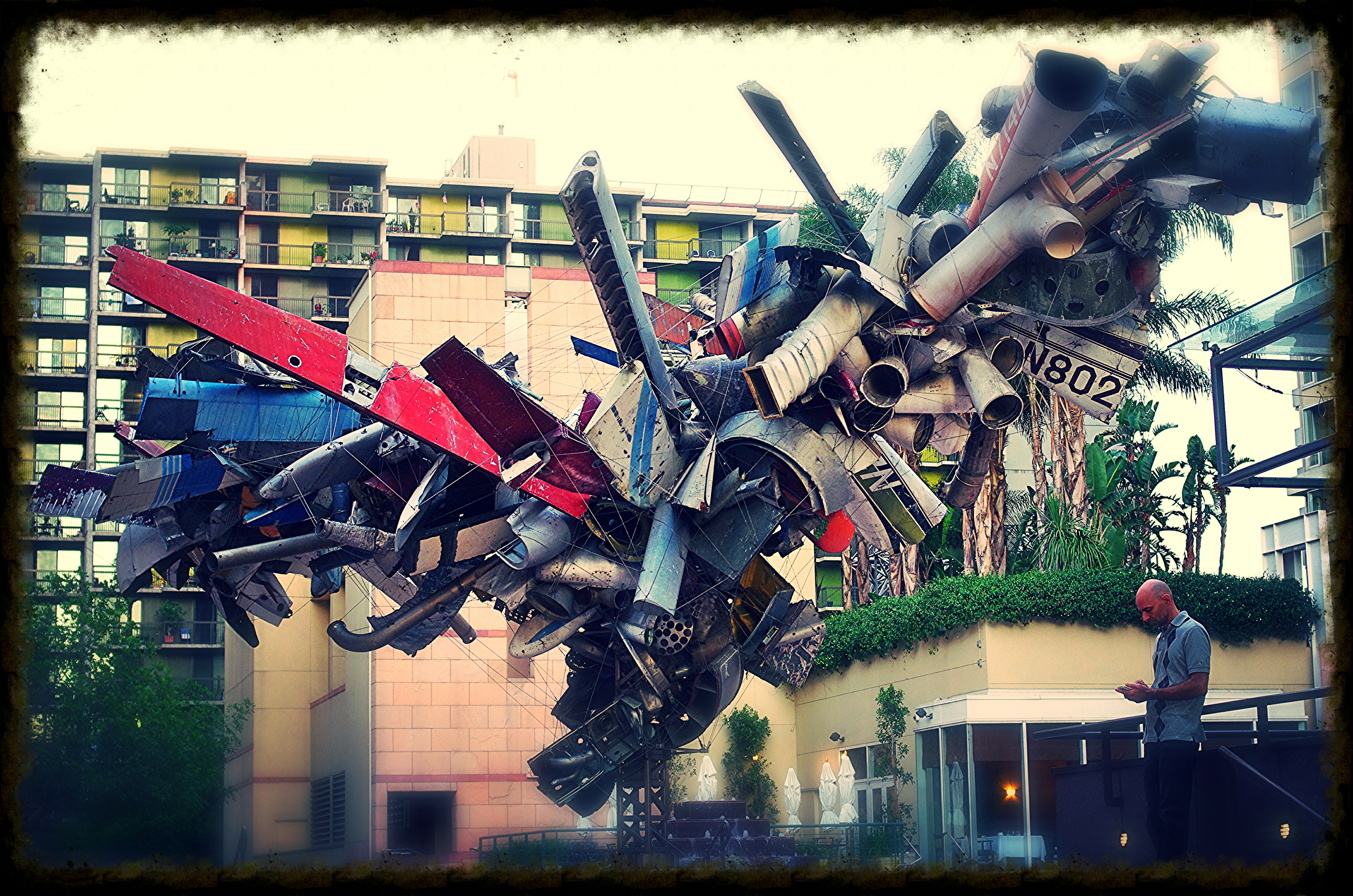
Sculpture by Nancy Rubins

Sculptors cultivating an industrial style include Kurt Schwitters, Man Ray, Mario Merz, Sarah Lucas, Arnaldo Morales, Nancy Rubins, Nataliya Zuban, and Nahum Tevet.

=== Other media ===
Industrial style art may also be found in photography and graphic design, among others.

== See also ==
- High-tech architecture
- Revivalism (architecture)
- Rustic modern
- Shabby chic
