= Simpson Memorial United Methodist Church (Charleston, West Virginia) =

Historic church in West Virginia, United States

- Simpson Memorial Methodist Episcopal Church
- U.S. National Register of Historic Places
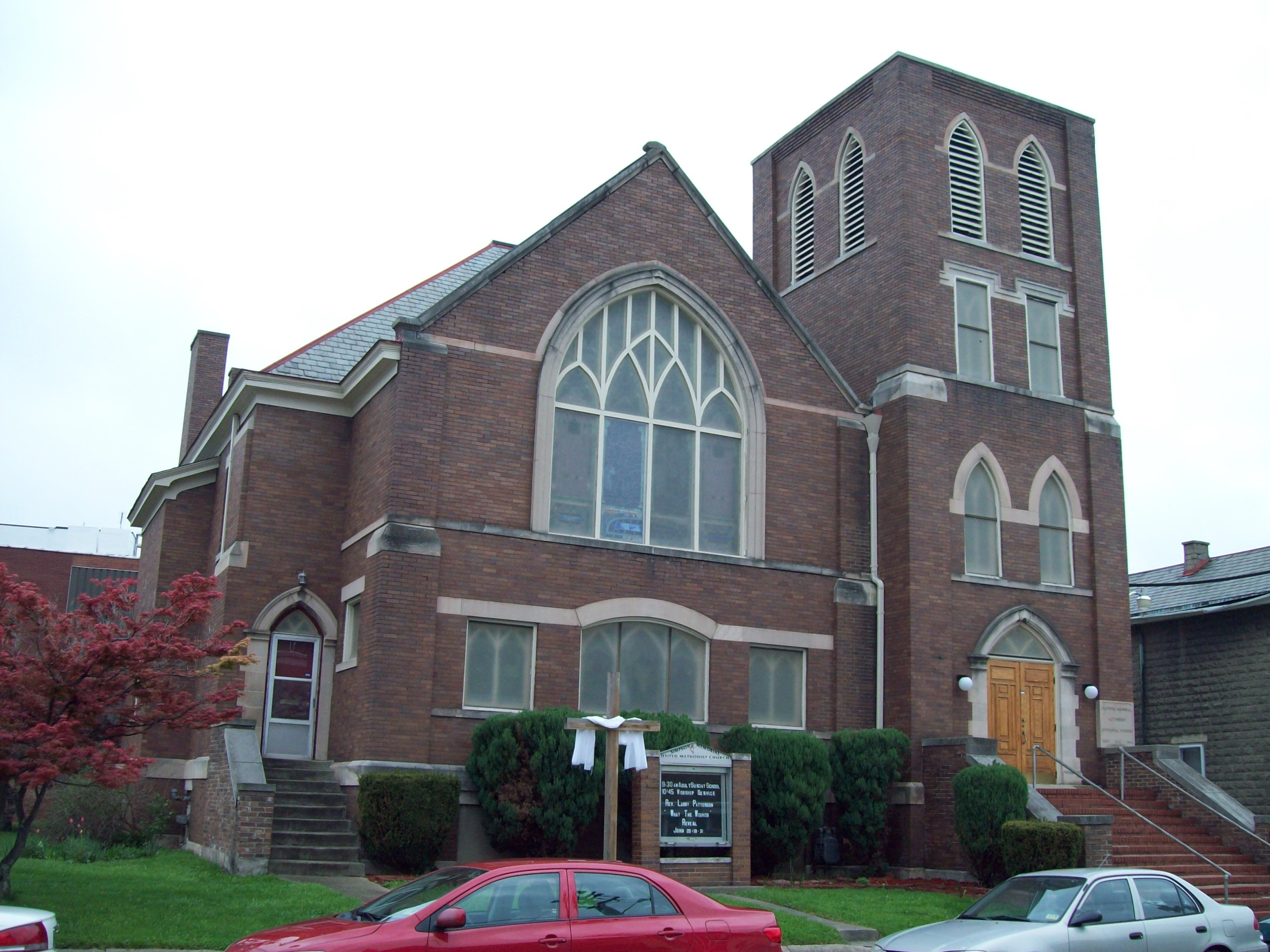
- Simpson Memorial United Methodist Church, April 2009

- Location within West Virginia Location within the United States
- Location: 607 Shrewsbury St., Charleston, West Virginia
- Coordinates: 38°21′6″N 81°37′44″W
- Built: 1914
- Architect: David Dick; Conker Brothers
- Architectural style: Late Gothic Revival
- NRHP reference No.: 91001011
- Added to NRHP: August 05, 1991

Simpson Memorial United Methodist Church, historically known as the Simpson Memorial Methodist Episcopal Church, is a historic Methodist Episcopal Church, now United Methodist, located at Charleston, West Virginia. It was constructed in 1914 and is a nearly square building on a high foundation. It features a high pitched hipped roof with platform and four story square bell tower. It is of late Gothic Revival styling with features common to many American Protestant churches of the early 20th century.

It was listed on the National Register of Historic Places in 1991.
