= Jersey Park Farm =

Historic house in Indiana, United States

- U.S. National Register of Historic Places
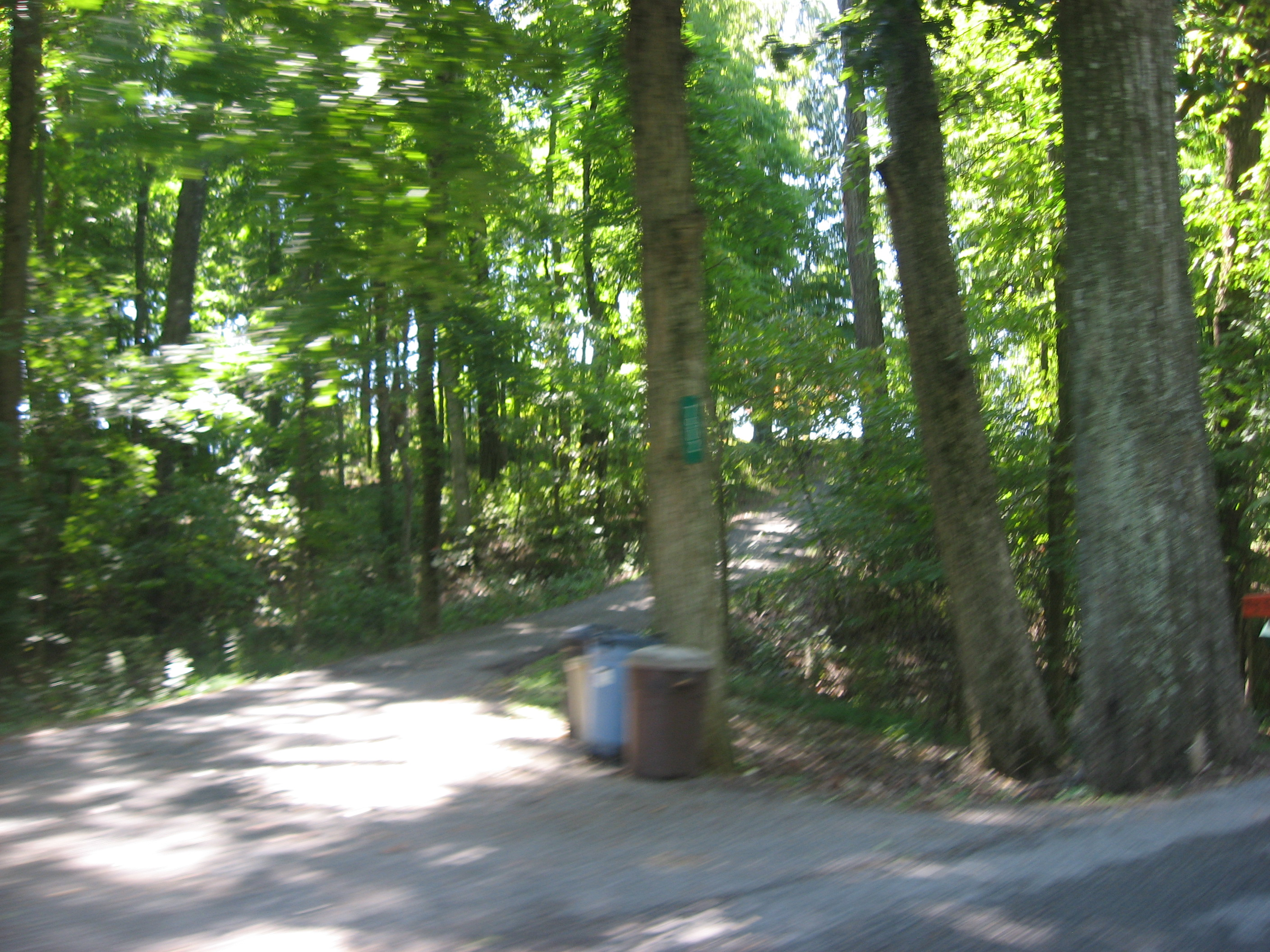
- Jersey Park Farm driveway, September 2012

- Location within Indiana Location within the United States
- Location: Off Cunningham Sarles and Borden Rds., northwest of Galena, Greenville Township, Floyd County, Indiana
- Coordinates: 38°22′39″N 85°57′39″W
- Area: 4 acres (1.6 ha)
- Built: 1875
- Built by: Coffman, John Spear
- Architectural style: Federal
- NRHP reference No.: 84001027
- Added to NRHP: March 1, 1984

Jersey Park Farm is a historic home and farm located in Greenville Township, Floyd County, Indiana. The farmhouse was built about 1875, and consists of a two-story, Federal style rectangular section with a two-story round section and one-story round section. It is built over a spring and features a wraparound porch. Also on the property are a contributing barn and icehouse.

It was listed on the National Register of Historic Places in 1984.
