= Saint Joseph, Indiana =

Saint Joseph, Indiana may refer to:

- Saint Joseph, Floyd County, Indiana, unincorporated town in United States
- Saint Joseph, Vanderburgh County, Indiana, unincorporated community in United States
- St. Joseph County, Indiana, county in United States
