= Floyd Central High School (Indiana) =

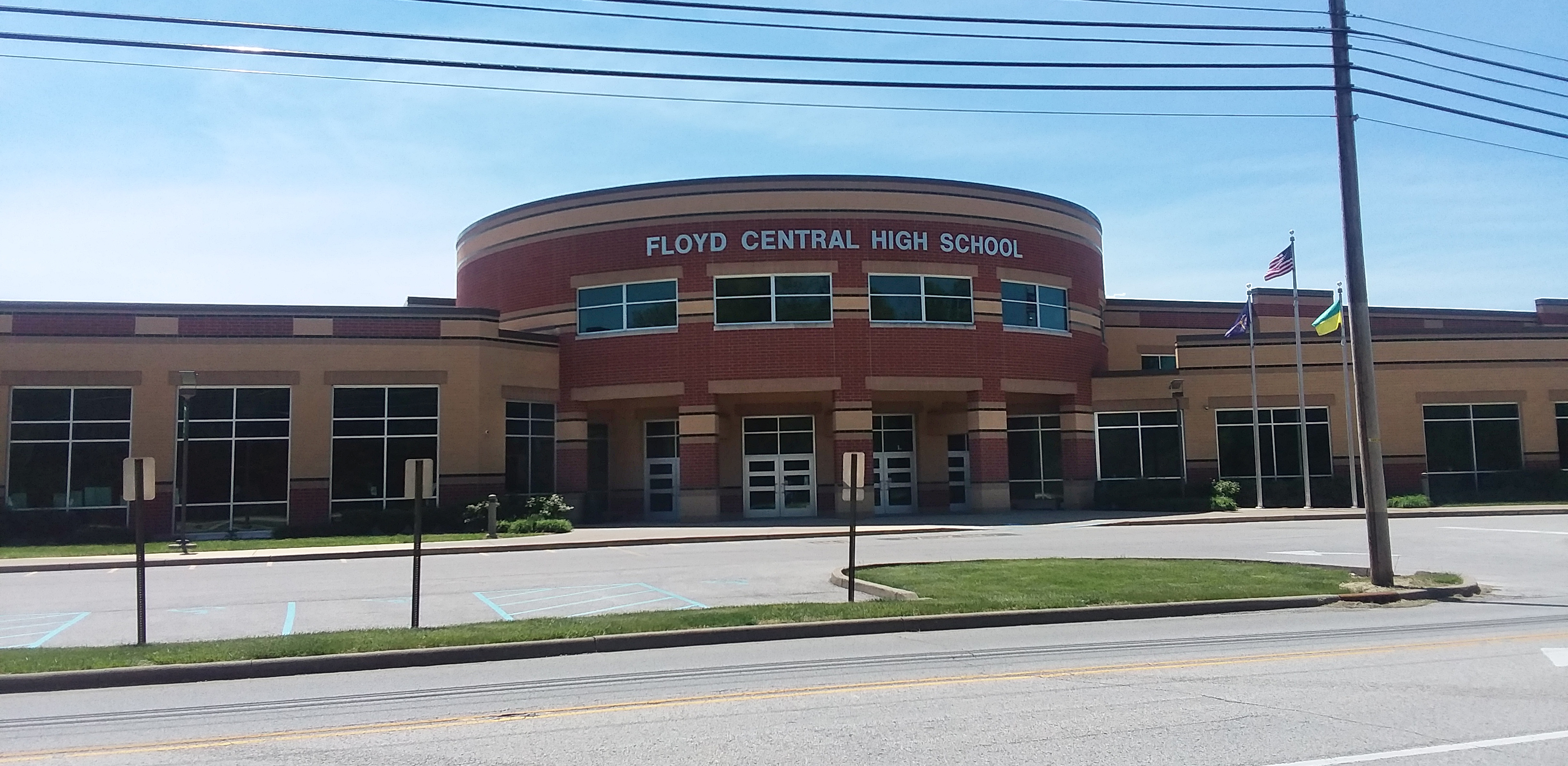

Location
- 6575 Old Vincennes Road; Floyds Knobs, Floyd County, Indiana 47119; United States; 38.332837°N 85.93116°W

Information
- Type: Public high school
- Mottoes: Fostering Excellence for a Lifetime; Ensuring high levels of student learning by empowering minds, building character, and inspiring growth
- Established: 1967; 59 years ago
- School district: New Albany-Floyd County Consolidated Schools
- Principal: Scott Hatton
- Teaching staff: 84.90 (FTE)
- Grades: 9-12
- Enrollment: 1,823 (2023-2024)
- Student to teacher ratio: 21.47
- Colors: Green and gold
- Athletics: Soccer, golf, tennis, cross country, track and field, American football, basketball, baseball, wrestling, volleyball, swimming, diving, cheerleading, eSports club, marching band, dance team
- Team name: Highlanders
- Rival: New Albany High School
- Newspaper: The Bagpiper
- Website: Homepage

Floyd Central High School is a public high school in the New Albany-Floyd County Consolidated School Corporation located in Floyds Knobs, an unincorporated area in Floyd County, Indiana, USA.

In addition to Floyds Knobs, the school serves Galena, Georgetown and Greenville.

== History ==
The school was built in 1967 and has had many expansions since then, including an auditorium. The school was called Floyd Central Junior-Senior High School until the opening of Highland Hills Middle School in 2003.

=== Beginning ===
Floyd Central was once considered to be a rural farming community school, but as it has developed, potential inhabitants now have a variety of housing options, such as horse farms, subdivisions or small towns. One of two high schools in the county, Floyd Central is a member of the New Albany-Floyd County Consolidated School Corporation, which enrolls around 11,000 students. New Albany is the other high school. The school mascot is a Scottish soldier called the Highlander, and the school's colors are green, gold and white.

=== Construction ===
The school board and Glen Barkes, the superintendent, started making plans for Floyd Central Junior/Senior High School in the early 1960s. The three main factors that led to the decision to construct a new high school were an expanded high school curriculum, lower transportation expenses, and an expanding school corporation. Schools in Floyd County were beginning to become overcrowded as a result of population growth. Around 9,800 pupils were anticipated to enroll on the first day of classes in New Albany Floyd County Schools in 1961, an increase of 200 students over the previous year. As Interstate Highway 64 was being built through the county, it was anticipated that this boom would continue.

Georgetown High School, the county's secondary high school at the time, had few resources to give its students. With the revised proposal, Georgetown may become an elementary school and a new high school might be built to meet the needs of the expanding student body. The school board's budget was about $2,250,000 when it initially started drafting a plan. The 50 acres (20 ha) site's construction began in 1965. Floyd Central has undergone extensive changes since the initial building of the school, in 1970, 1984, 2004 and 2010.

== Facilities ==
A planetarium, computer laboratories, a media center, a radio/TV studio, two gymnasia, an auditorium, an ROTC building, a small theater and a restaurant with outdoor seating are all included in the 8 acres (3.2 ha) that make up the building. The campus's total site area is 97.25 acres (39.36 ha) including the Les Wright Athletic Complex, which also houses the Ron Weigleb Football Stadium, two soccer fields, two softball courts, two baseball diamonds, practice fields and concession areas.

== Athletics ==
The girls' cross country team is the most decorated, with four state titles from 1989 to 1992. The boys' cross country team won the state championship in 1991. Boys' golf won state titles in 2005-06 and 2006–07. Boys' basketball has made two appearances in the state finals, in 1971 with the "Superhicks" and in 1989 with the Indiana Mr. Basketball and Trester Award Winner Pat Graham. Another notable achievement in the athletic program is the 38 consecutive sectional title wins in the tennis program.

The Floyd Central Dazzlers won two national championship titles one in Pom and one in Hip-hop in 2023. In May 2023, the Dazzlers had won 30 national titles.

The Floyd Central Cheerleaders won a State Title in 2020.

The Floyd Central boys wrestling team won the 2024 IWCA team state title.

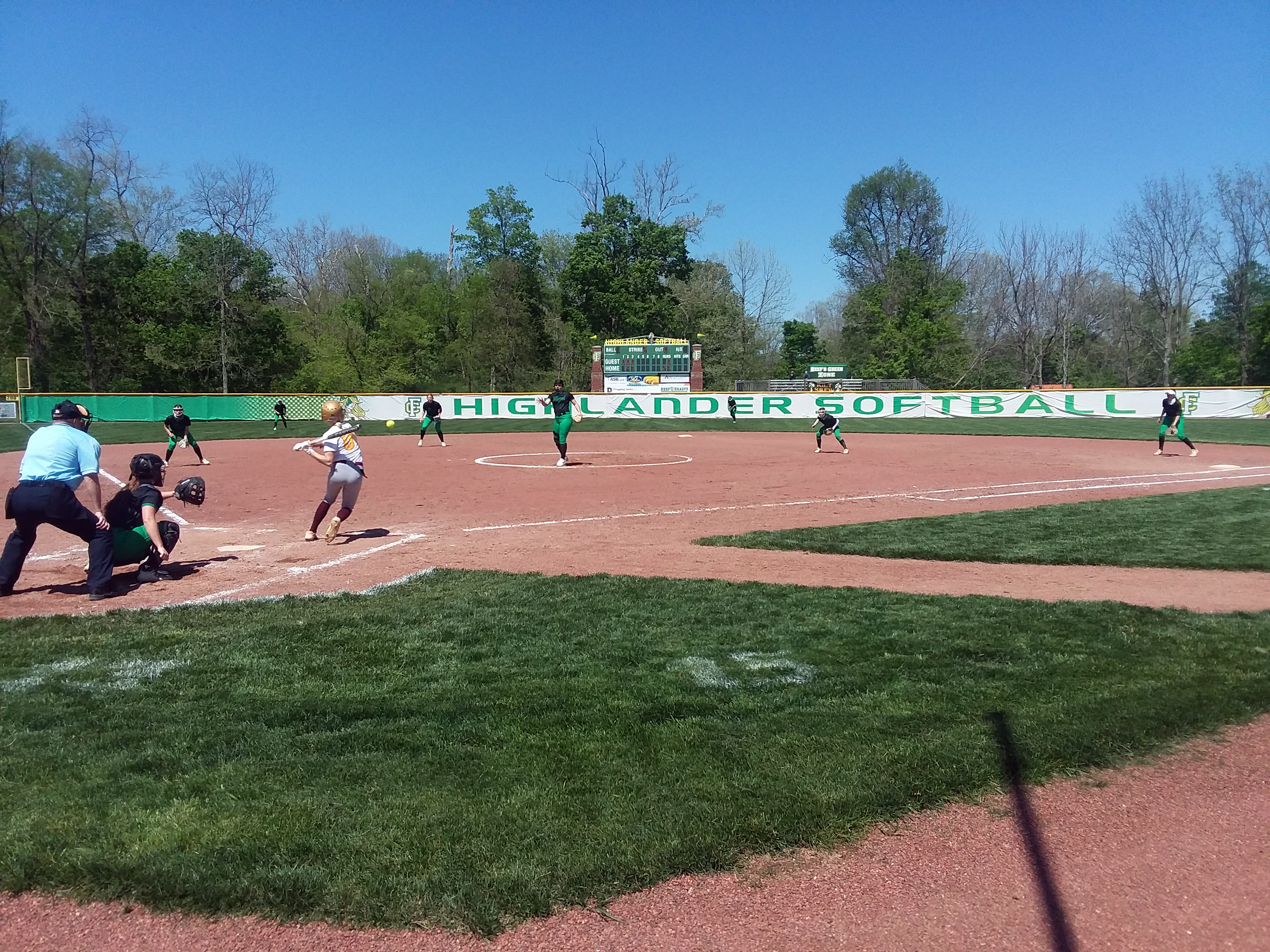
A softball game at Floyd Central

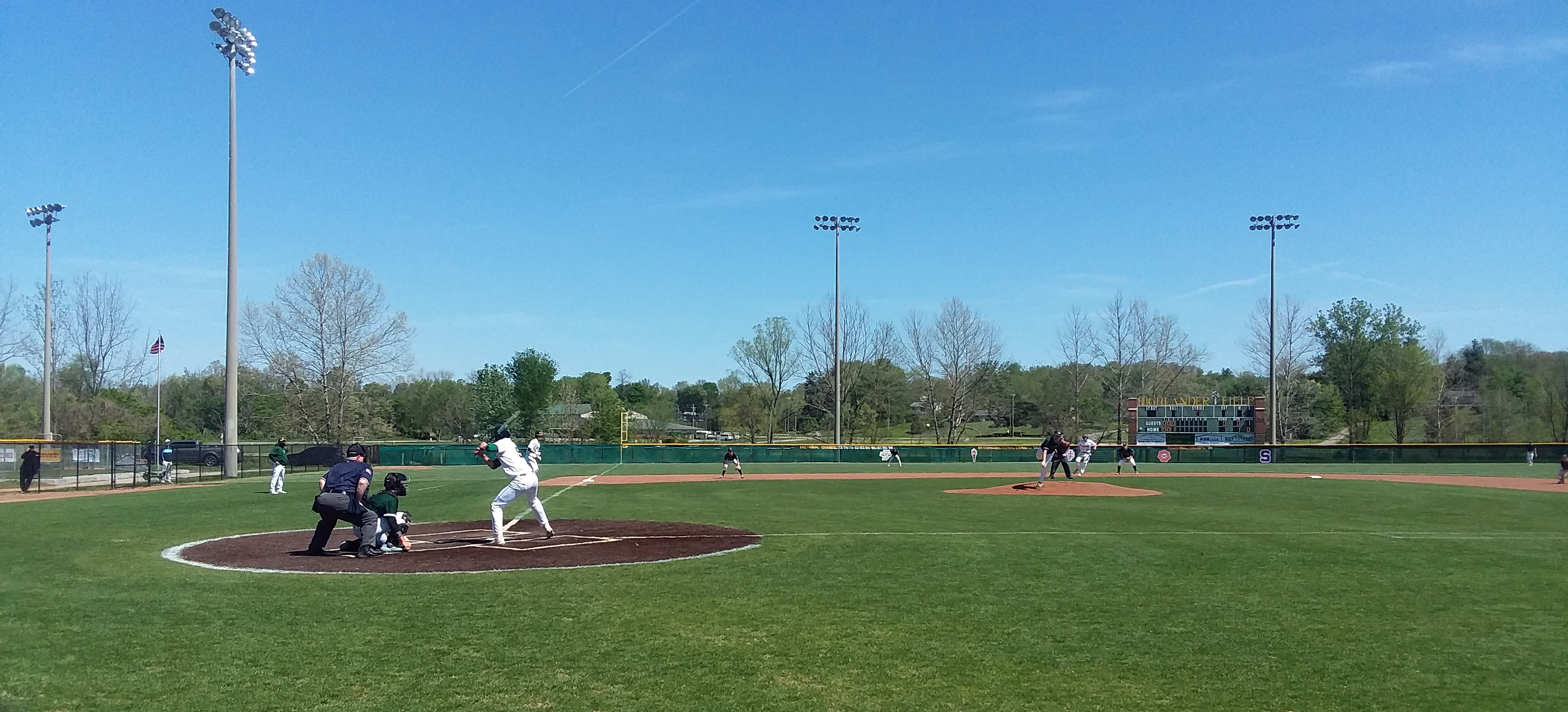
A baseball game at Floyd Central

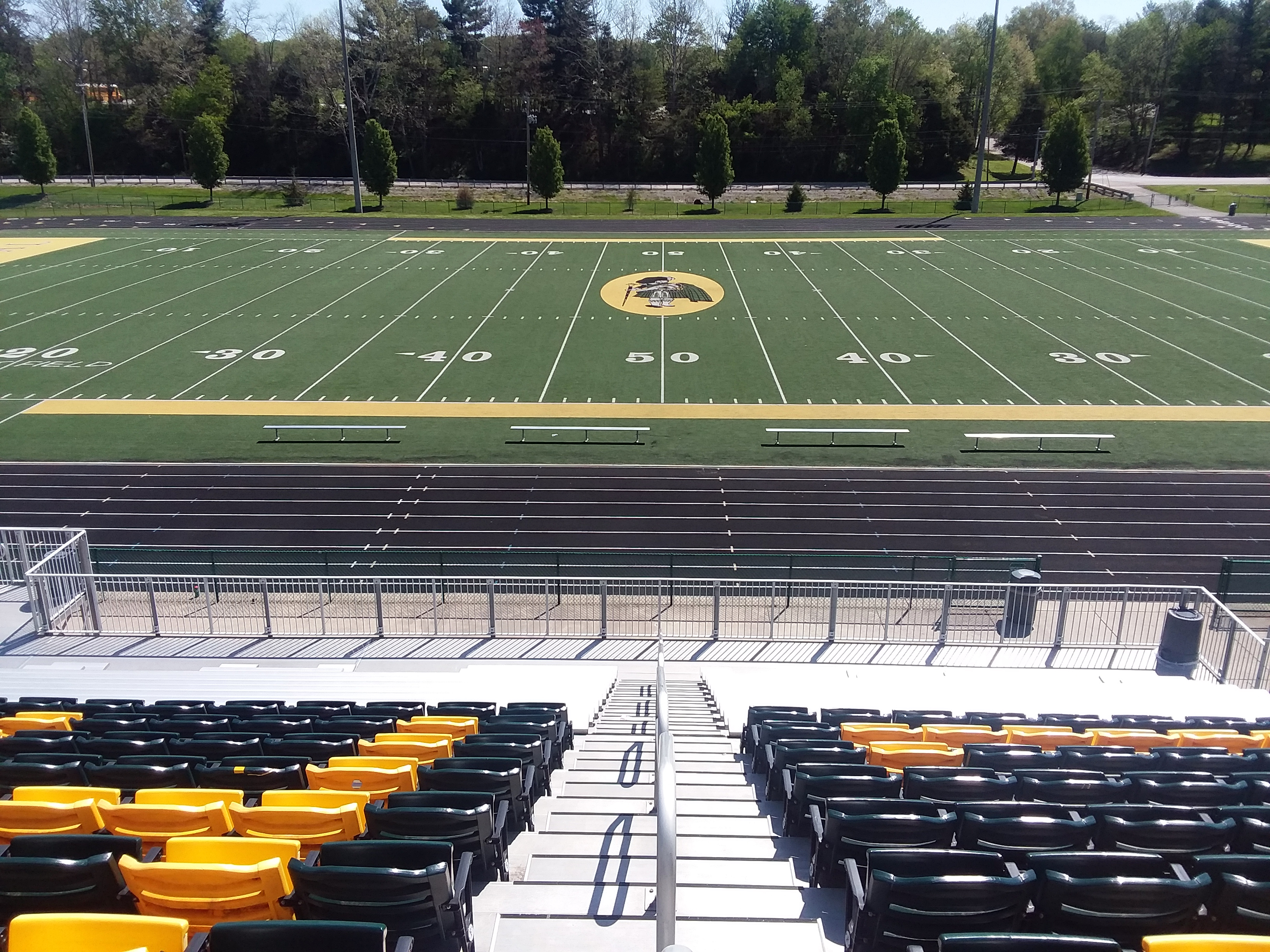
American football and track stadium at Floyd Central

== Performing arts ==
Floyd Central Theater was recognized in 2007 by the Educational Theater Association as one of the top five theater programs in the US. It has also received four invitations to represent Indiana at The International Fringe Festival in Edinburgh, Scotland. In the 2017–2018 school year, the theatre program was asked by The Walt Disney Company to produce a demo version of the hit Broadway musical Newsies to see how it could make the Broadway play work for a high school production.

The Acappella Choir won the ISSMA State Championship in 2015, and has been a state finalist almost every year in recent decades.

The orchestra won the 1995, 2017 and 2023 ISSMA State Championships and has qualified for the ISSMA state finals 32 years in a row.

In addition to marching and symphonic band, Floyd Central has a volunteer pep band to play at basketball games, a jazz ensemble and strong winter percussion/winter guard programs. The music department as a whole has been nationally recognized twice as a Grammy School, being designated as a Grammy Signature Gold Award School in 1998-1999 and as a Grammy Signature School in 2002. The school also operates WNAS-TV and WNAS-FM, in co-operation with New Albany High School. In August 2023, orchestra teacher Doug Elmore was named the winner of a $10,000 Barry Manilow Music Project contest. Half of the award will go to buying musical instruments for the school's program.

== See also ==
- List of high schools in Indiana
- New Albany-Floyd County Schools
- FCHS 2021-22 Planner and Handbook
