= Carr Township, Indiana =

Carr Township is the name of two townships in the U.S. state of Indiana:

- Carr Township, Clark County, Indiana
- Carr Township, Jackson County, Indiana
