= Hamburg, Clark County, Indiana =

Unincorporated community in Indiana, United States

Hamburg
- Unincorporated community
- Clark County's location in Indiana

- Location in Clark County
- Coordinates: 38°23′00″N 85°46′03″W
- Country: United States
- State: Indiana
- County: Clark
- Township: Silver Creek
- Elevation: 492 ft (150 m)
- ZIP code: 47172
- FIPS code: 18-30546
- GNIS feature ID: 435630

Hamburg is an unincorporated community in Silver Creek Township, Clark County, Indiana. Parts of Hamburg are within the municipal boundaries of Clarksville and Sellersburg.

== History ==
Hamburg was laid out in 1837. It was named after Hamburg, in Germany. Hamburg contained a post office from the 1830s until the 1850s.

== Demographics ==
The United States Census Bureau delineated Hamburg as a census designated place in the 2022 American Community Survey.
