= Navilleton, Indiana =

- Unincorporated community
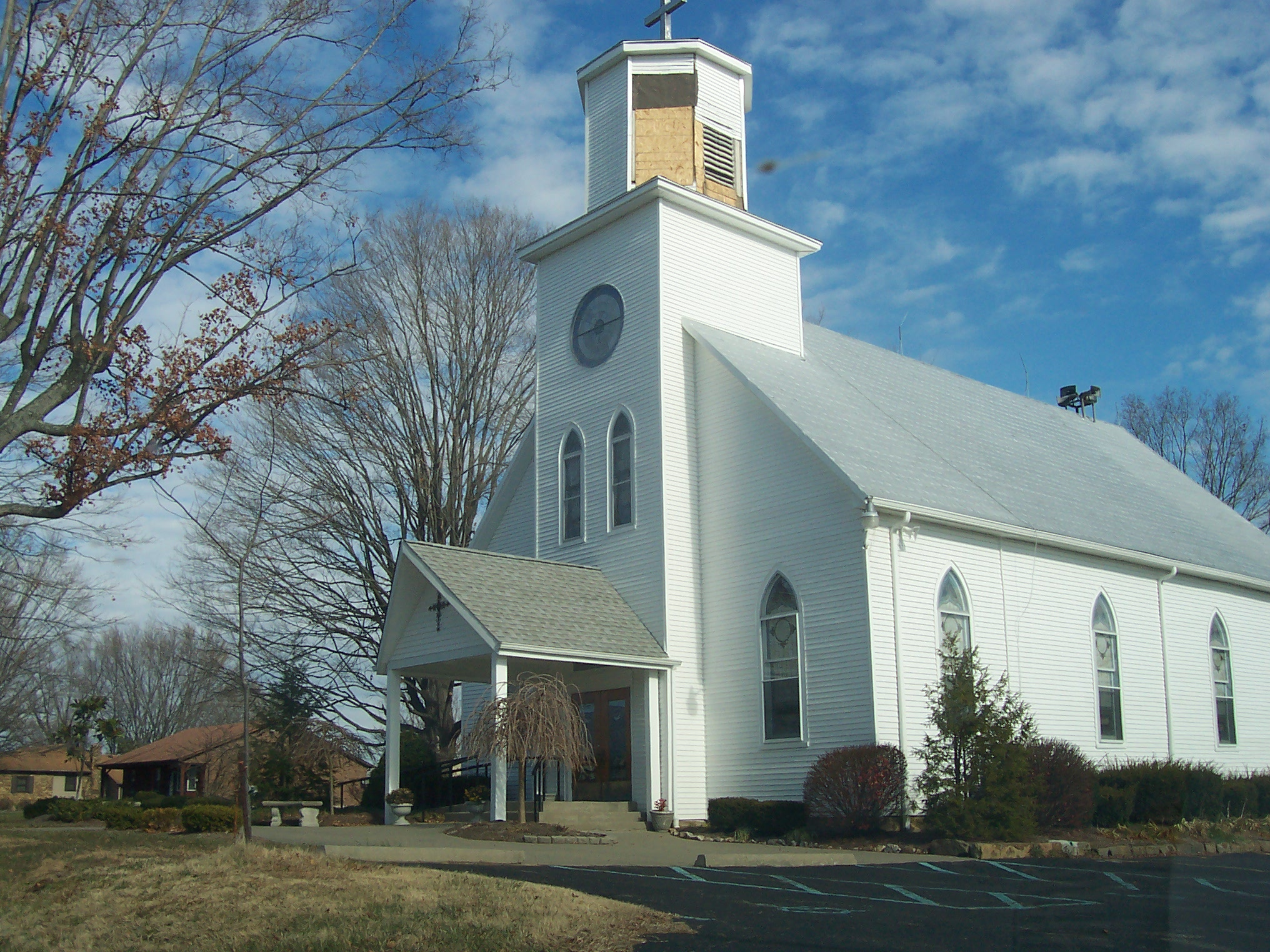
- St. Mary's Catholic Church

- Location within Indiana Location within the United States
- Coordinates: 38°22′54″N 85°56′19″W
- Country: United States
- State: Indiana
- County: Floyd
- Township: Greenville
- Elevation: 820 ft (250 m)
- ZIP code: 47119
- FIPS code: 18-52092
- GNIS feature ID: 439953

Navilleton is an unincorporated community in Greenville Township, Floyd County, Indiana.

== History ==
The first settlement at Navilleton was made in 1844 by a colony of German Catholics, among them Michael Naville, for whom the town was named.

A post office opened in Navilleton in 1894, and remained in operation until it was discontinued in 1902.
