= Greenville Township, Floyd County, Indiana =

Greenville Township
- Township
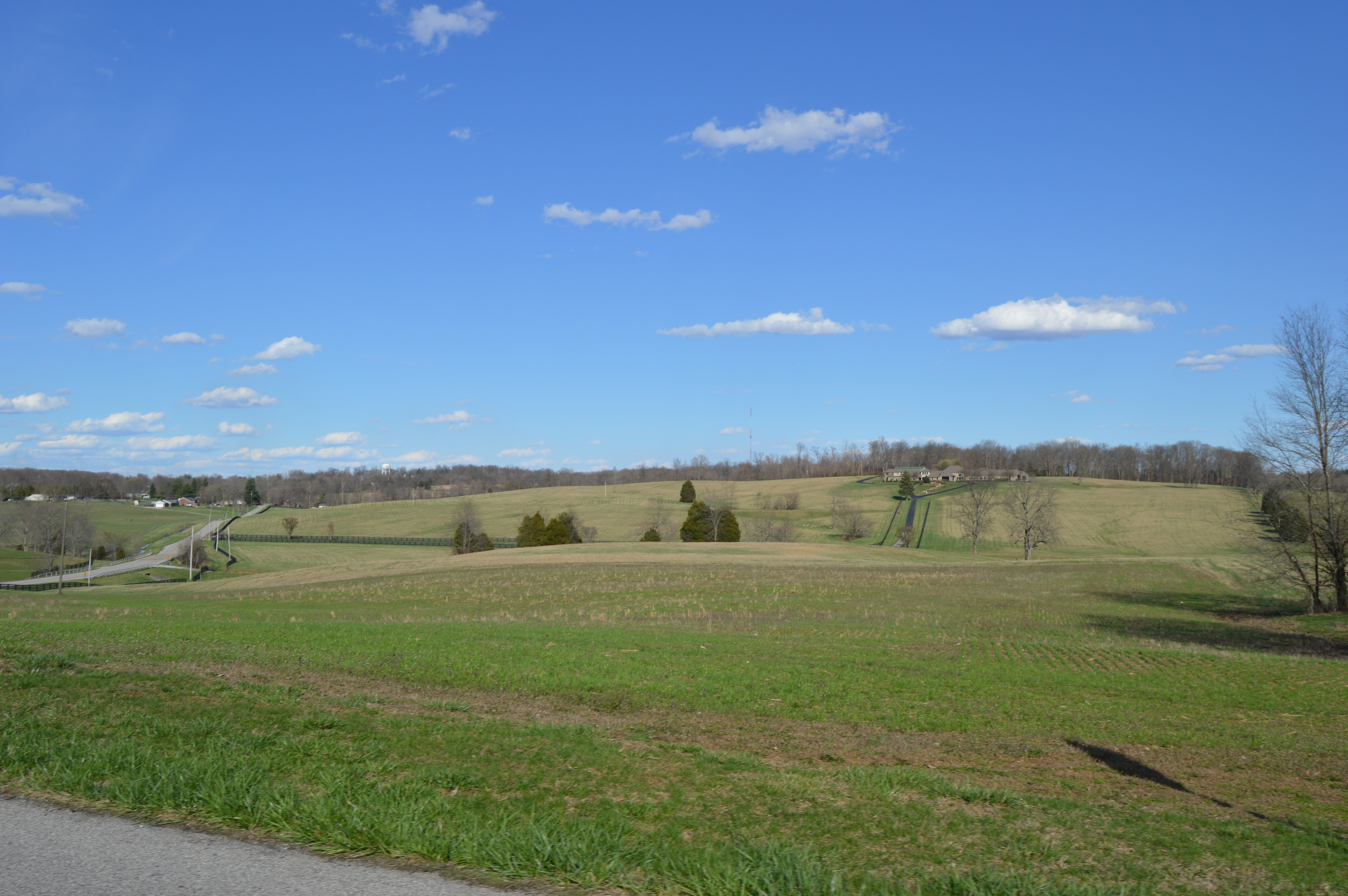
- Fields south of Greenville

- Location of Greenville Township in Floyd County
- Coordinates: 38°22′07″N 85°58′43″W
- Country: United States
- State: Indiana
- County: Floyd

Government
  - Type: Indiana township

Area
  - Total: 33.5 sq mi (87 km^{2})
  - Land: 33.39 sq mi (86.5 km^{2})
  - Water: 0.11 sq mi (0.28 km^{2})
- Elevation: 820 ft (250 m)

Population (2020)
  - Total: 7,590
  - Density: 202/sq mi (78/km^{2})
- FIPS code: 18-29862
- GNIS feature ID: 453355

Greenville Township is one of five townships in Floyd County, Indiana. As of the 2010 census, its population was 6,746 and it contained 2,532 housing units.

== History ==
The Jersey Park Farm was listed on the National Register of Historic Places in 1984.

== Geography ==
According to the 2010 census, the township has a total area of 33.5 square miles (87 km^{2}), of which 33.39 square miles (86.5 km^{2}) (or 99.67%) is land and 0.11 square miles (0.28 km^{2}) (or 0.33%) is water.

=== Cities and towns ===
- Galena
- Greenville

=== Unincorporated towns ===
- Navilleton

=== Adjacent townships ===
- Wood Township, Clark County (northeast)
- Lafayette Township (east)
- Georgetown Township (southeast)
- Jackson Township, Harrison County (southwest)
- Morgan Township, Harrison County (west)
- Jackson Township, Washington County (northwest)

=== Major highways ===
- U.S. Route 150
- Indiana State Road 335

=== Cemeteries ===
The township contains three cemeteries: Buttontown (in an 1876 obituary, it was called Kepley Schoolhouse Cemetery), Greenlawn and Mount Eden.
