= Starlight, Indiana =

Unincorporated community in Indiana, United States

Starlight
- Unincorporated community
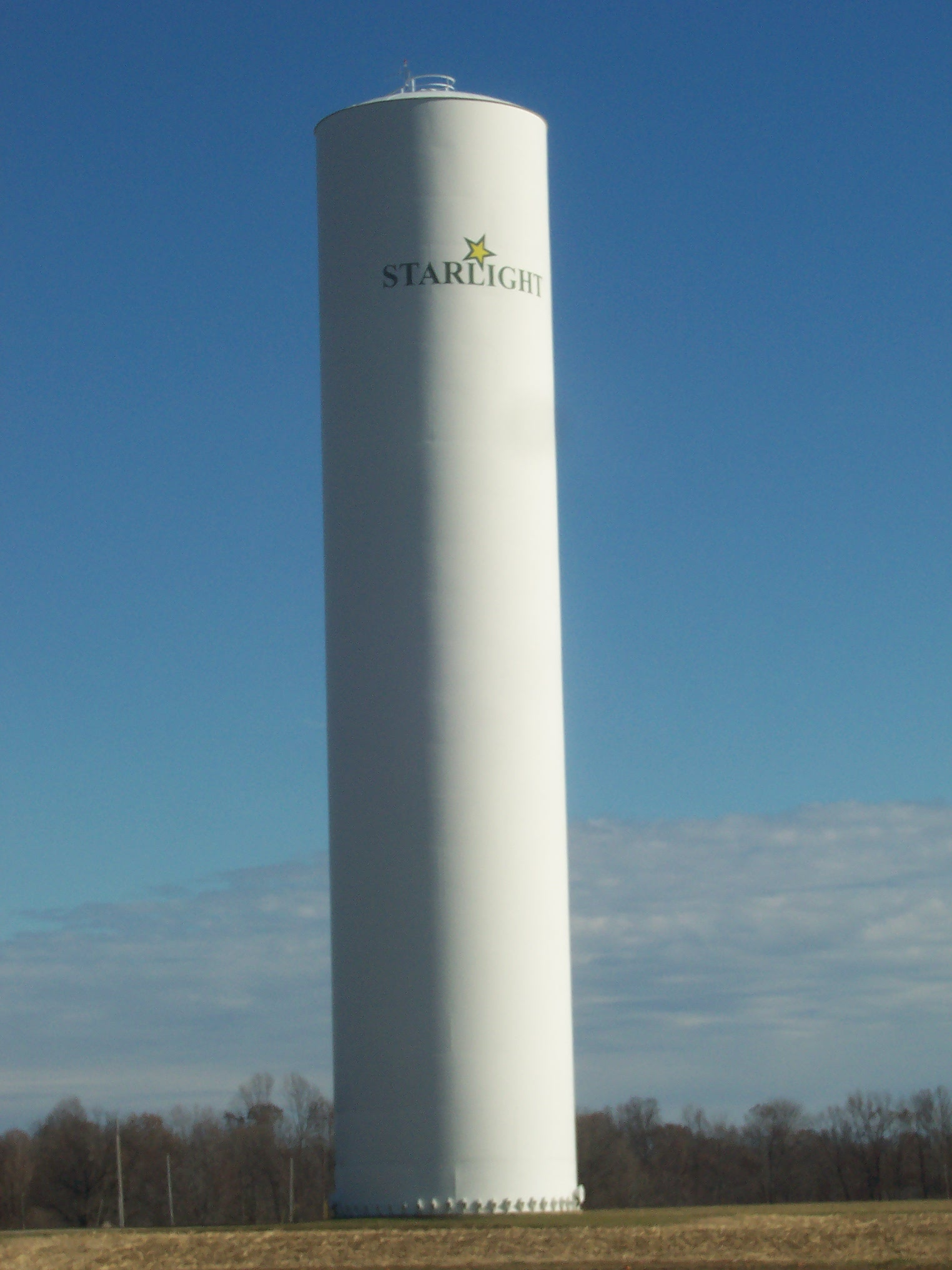
- Starlight water tower

- Clark County's location in Indiana

- Location in Clark County
- Coordinates: 38°24′54″N 85°53′33″W
- Country: United States
- State: Indiana
- County: Clark
- Township: Wood
- Elevation: 935 ft (285 m)
- ZIP code: 47106
- GNIS feature ID: 444077

Starlight is an unincorporated community in Wood Township, Clark County, Indiana, United States. Addresses in Starlight are listed as part of nearby Borden.

== History ==
A post office was established at Starlight in 1892, and remained in operation until it was discontinued in 1902. According to tradition, Starlight was named when a new light fixture in the local store shined like a bright star.

== Attractions ==
Starlight is best known for two large farms which are open to the public year-round as tourist attractions. The two farms — Huber's Orchard & Winery and Joe Huber Family Farm & Restaurant — have expanded over the years from simple "you-pick" operations to full-fledged attractions, with restaurants, petting zoos, winery and live entertainment. The farms offer visitors a chance to experience "a day in the country." The two farms are separate business however the owners are distantly related.

Starlight hosts a popular annual Starlight Strawberry Festival, held on Memorial Day weekend and sponsored by the local Roman Catholic parish.

== See also ==
- List of attractions and events in the Louisville metropolitan area
