= Silver Creek Township, Clark County, Indiana =

Silver Creek Township
- Township
- Location of Silver Creek Township in Clark County
- Coordinates: 38°23′40″N 85°45′42″W
- Country: United States
- State: Indiana
- County: Clark

Government
  - Type: Indiana township

Area
  - Total: 16.98 sq mi (44.0 km^{2})
  - Land: 16.72 sq mi (43.3 km^{2})
  - Water: 0.27 sq mi (0.70 km^{2})
- Elevation: 472 ft (144 m)

Population (2020)
  - Total: 13,804
  - Density: 709.3/sq mi (273.9/km^{2})
- FIPS code: 18-69696
- GNIS feature ID: 453848

Silver Creek Township is one of twelve townships in Clark County, Indiana. As of the 2010 census, its population was 11,858 and it contained 4,858 housing units.

== History ==
Silver Creek Township was established in or before 1815, but when exactly is uncertain because records have been lost. The township takes its name from Silver Creek, the largest stream in Clark County.

== Geography ==
According to the 2010 census, the township has a total area of 16.98 square miles (44.0 km^{2}), of which 16.72 square miles (43.3 km^{2}) (or 98.47%) is land and 0.27 square miles (0.70 km^{2}) (or 1.59%) is water.

=== Cities and towns ===
- Clarksville (north quarter)
- Sellersburg

=== Unincorporated towns ===
- Hamburg
- Speed

=== Adjacent townships ===
- Union Township (north)
- Charlestown Township (northeast)
- Utica Township (east)
- Jeffersonville Township (south)
- New Albany Township, Floyd County (southwest)
- Carr Township (northwest)

=== Major highways ===
- Interstate 65
- U.S. Route 31
- State Road 60
- State Road 311
- State Road 403

=== Cemeteries ===
The township contains several cemeteries: Bottorff/Couch, Cremer/Kramer, Cunningham, Hendricks (a.k.a. Sarles Cemetery and Hell's Half Acre), Hopewell Baptist Church, Jenkins, Lehmanowsky, Phelps, Poindexter, Plum Run, Sellersburg, Smith Cemetery, St. Joseph Catholic Church, Francis Wells Family (a.k.a. Francis Wells), Whalen

== See also ==
- Silver Creek High School, located in the township
