= List of public art in Floyd County, Indiana =

This is a list of public art in Floyd County, Indiana.

This list applies only to works of public art accessible in an outdoor public space. For example, this does not include artwork visible inside a museum.

Most of the works mentioned are sculptures. When this is not the case (e.g., sound installation,) it is stated next to the title.

== Mount St. Francis ==
| Title | Artist | Year | Location/GPS Coordinates | Material | Dimensions | Owner | Image |
|---|---|---|---|---|---|---|---|
| St. Francis With Deer | Unknown | ca. 1961 | Mount Saint Francis Center for Spirituality | Marble | Sculpture: approx. 4 ft. 10 in. x 2 ft. 5 in. x 1 ft. 9 1/2 in. | Province of Our Lady of Consolation | |

== New Albany ==
| Title | Artist | Year | Location/GPS Coordinates | Material | Dimensions | Owner | Image |
|---|---|---|---|---|---|---|---|
| The Annunciation | Unknown | | St. Mary's Church 38°17′19.68″N 85°48′58.52″W | Marble | 2 figures. Gabriel: approx. 7 x 3 x 3 ft.; Mary: approx. 4 1/2 x 2 1/2 x 3 ft.; Base: approx. H. 6 ft. x Diam. 7 ft. (over 3,000 lbs.) | St. Mary's Catholic Church | |
| Companion | Unknown | 1978 | Kraft Graceland Memorial Park | Bronze | Sculpture: approx. 75 x 27 x 17 in. | Kraft Graceland Memorial Park | |
| Crucifixion | Daprato Statuary Company | | Catholic Cemetery of New Albany | Metal | Sculpture: approx. 13 ft. x 81 in. x 30 in. | St. Mary's Catholic Church | |
| Guardian Angel | Unknown | | St. Mary's School 38°17′21.25″N 85°48′58.11″W | Metal | Approx. 5 x 4 x 2 1/2 ft. | St. Mary's School | |
| Mary | Unknown | | St. Mary's Catholic Church 38°17′19.71″N 85°48′59.01″W | Metal | Approx. 5 ft. x 1 ft. 8 in. x 1 ft. | St. Mary's Catholic Church | |
| The Search | Barney Bright | 1984 | New Albany-Floyd County Public Library 38°17′6.79″N 85°49′33.96″W | Bronze | Sculpture: approx. 9 x 14 x 6 ft. | New Albany-Floyd County Public Library | |
| Volunteer Firemen's Monument | Charles Edwards | 1902 | Fairview Cemetery | Pewter | Sculpture: approx. 6 x 2 x 2 ft. | City of New Albany | |
| West Entrance Figures | Unknown | | Carnegie Center for Art & History 38°17′12.07″N 85°49′18.63″W | Limestone | 2 sculptures. West entrance sculpture: approx. 7 ft. x 10 ft. x 20 in.; South entrance sculpture: approx. 4 1/2 ft. x 12 ft. x 16 in. | Carnegie Center for Art & History | |
