= Speed, Indiana =

Unincorporated community in Indiana, United States

Speed
- Unincorporated community
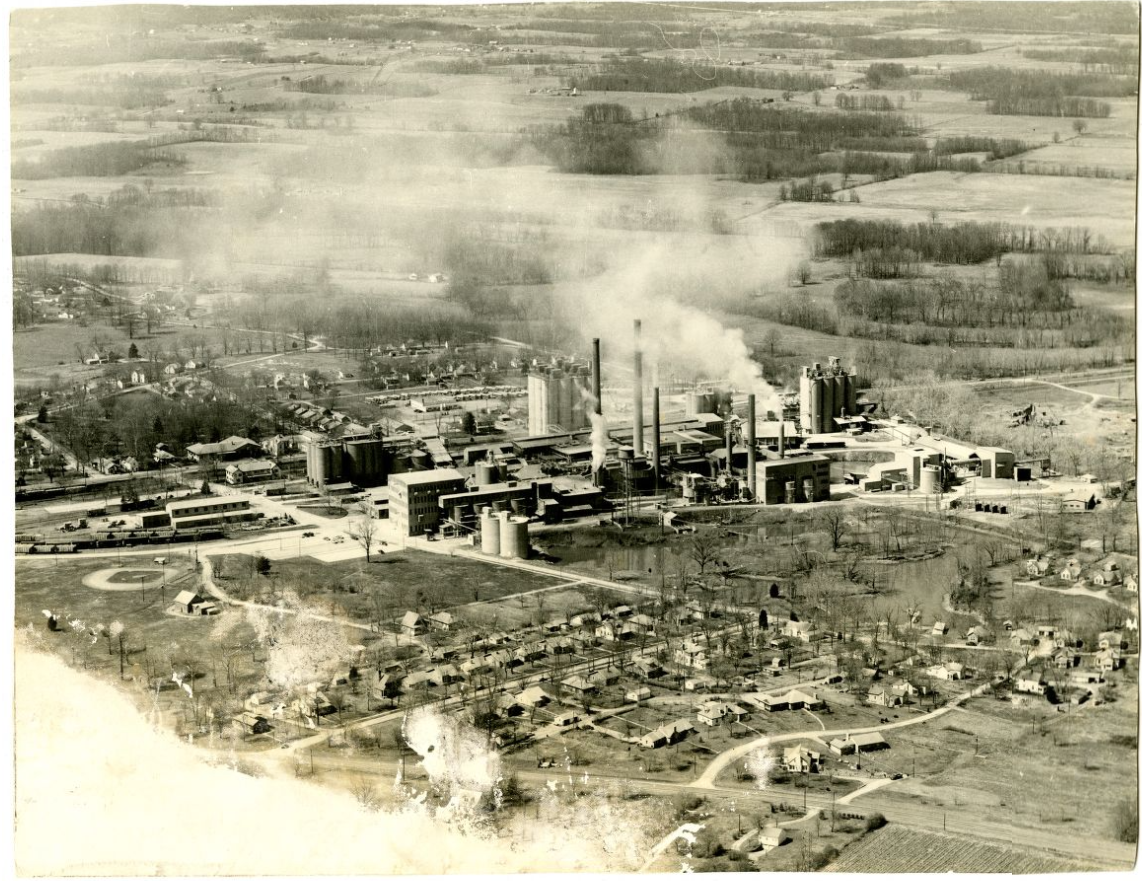
- An aerial view of Speed, Indiana, around 1950.

- Clark County's location in Indiana

- Location in Clark County
- Coordinates: 38°24′44″N 85°45′09″W
- Country: United States
- State: Indiana
- County: Clark
- Township: Silver Creek
- Elevation: 476 ft (145 m)
- Time zone: Eastern Standard Time
- ZIP code: 47172
- Area code: 812
- FIPS code: 18-71810
- GNIS feature ID: 443928

Speed is an unincorporated community in Silver Creek Township, Clark County, Indiana, United States. It used to be known as Fredricksburg.

== History ==
A post office was established at Speed in 1922, and remained in operation until it was discontinued in 1963. The area was previously known as Petersburg– but was renamed to Speed, after the businessman James B. Speed who chose the location for a cement mill. Speed was established as a company run town. The company ran the general store, hotel, post office and owned many of the homes around the mill, which were built to house the cement plant employees. Speed was an example of the concept of Welfare Capitalism, in which a company would provide housing and numerous other accommodations such as clubs for its workers to ensure a low turnover rate. The Community House was built in 1919, with a gymnasium added in 1925. The building was used by the Speed and Sellersburg community for meetings, parties, movies, library, school, well baby clinic, dances and much more. By 1963, the Community House was no longer being used during the summer months because of the many changes in the needs of the community. In July 1966, Louisville Cement Company decided to permanently close the building as a community house and renovate the space into a restaurant and store. Around October 1966, Joseph and Lavina Sexton opened the Speed Restaurant in the main part of the building. It included a dining room, private party rooms and a snack bar. Also at this time, Glenn Johnson leased the gymnasium and moved the Speed Store into it. He had been running the old grocery store in a building which was located next to the Community House since 1951. The old Speed Store building was torn down around 1967. A parking lot occupies the space where the Community House, Speed Store, Smitty's Inn, and several homes used to be. The hotel was also torn down, though the space is now a grass lot. One of the steam engines, No. 11, used by Speed's cement mill is now in preservation at the Kentucky Railway Museum, still wearing the same livery it left the works with.
