= Saint Joseph, Floyd County, Indiana =

Saint Joseph, Indiana
- Unincorporated community
- Location within Indiana Location within the United States
- Coordinates: 38°24′00″N 85°48′30″W
- Country: United States
- State: Indiana
- County: Floyd
- Township: New Albany
- Elevation: 561 ft (171 m)
- ZIP code: 47172
- FIPS code: 18-66935
- GNIS feature ID: 442619

Saint Joseph is an unincorporated community in New Albany Township, Floyd County, Indiana.

== History ==
Saint Joseph was founded in the 1840s by a colony of German Catholics.
