= Ostis Otto Moore =

American judge

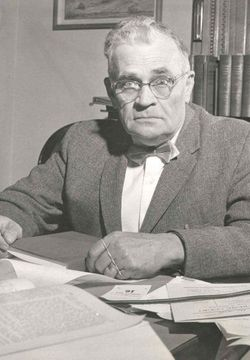

Colorado Supreme Court
- In office 1949–1969

Personal details
- Born: Ostis Otto Moore; May 14, 1896 Floyds Knobs, Indiana, U.S.
- Died: December 10, 1990 (aged 94) Denver, Colorado, United States
- Education: University of Denver

Ostis Otto Moore (May 14, 1896 – December 10, 1990) was an American lawyer, author and political figure who served as a judge and chief justice of the Colorado Supreme Court from 1948 until his retirement in 1969. After retiring from the courts, Moore served as the Assistant District Attorney in the Denver District Attorney's Office under Dale Tooley.

== Early life and education ==
Ostis Otto "Otto" Moore, named for his father's best friends Otto and Ostis, was born on May 14, 1896, near Floyds Knobs, Indiana in a farmhouse. His parents were David Burke Moore and Charlotte Scott, who developed tuberculosis when Moore was about five years of age. Hoping to improve her health, the family moved to Denver, Colorado, in 1901. They lived in a tent in northwest Denver during the first summer. Charlotte Scott Moore died in 1906. Moore's brother and sister were sent to Indiana to live with relatives for one year. They returned to Denver in 1907 and David Moore remarried the following year to the best friend of his mother. Moore left home and supported himself with three paper routes.

Moore graduated from South High School, and in 1916 was accepted on a football scholarship to the University of Denver. He was the president of his freshman and sophomore classes and was a member of the Sigma Alpha Epsilon fraternity. He served the military during World War I and returned after the war to the University of Denver, where he received his law degree in 1923. He received an honorary doctorate from the University of Denver in 1969.

== Military ==
After unsuccessfully being able to enlist into the Army Flying Service or the Marine due to a football injury, Moore was drafted into the US Army during World War I and spent 27 months in France.

== Career ==
=== Early career ===
In 1924, Moore joined the Denver District Attorney's office, and was charged with prosecuting bootleggers. Moore also investigated and had many incidents with the Ku Klux Klan (KKK), which had a strong hold on politics in Denver in the 1920s and 1930s. (In 1962, he was interviewed by James Harlan Davis about the KKK. He shared his reminiscences about his experiences during the height of the Ku Klux Klan influence in Colorado.)

In 1927, around the time of the Great Depression, he left the district attorney's office and started his own law practice, often accepting produce and other goods as payment. In an effort to help senior citizens, he formed the National Annuity League and published a weekly paper for the elderly called the Bulletin Free Press. He worked with the United States House Committee on Ways and Means in Washington, D.C., on constructing legislation, which later became the Social Security Act. He also traveled the state and gave speeches and lobbied for support for the act. In 1936, his Colorado constitutional amendment was passed. In 1947, Moore wrote a book entitled Mile High Harbor about the movement to provide income for seniors.

In 1939, Moore returned to the Denver District Attorney's office. After being defeated in the election for Denver District Attorney in 1940, he returned to private practice. The William Eugene Wymer case was one of several of his murder defenses that received national publicity.

=== Colorado Supreme Court ===
Moore was elected to the Colorado Supreme Court in 1948. He served from 1949 until 1968 on the bench. During his twenty years with the Court, Moore was involved in more than 5,000 decisions and wrote 1,038 opinions. He said of his time as a justice, "I particularly remember my dissents. I really relished them; they had more conviction. I may be wrong, but I'm never in doubt." He served three terms as Chief Justice (1957, 1967 and 1968). In 1969, Moore retired from the Colorado Supreme Court. During his service, he wrote the majority opinion in 1968 that set a still-standing precedent that it is unconstitutional to require a defendant to prove insanity. He stated that it was the prosecution's burden to prove guilt or sanity: "It cannot be done … for the very simple reason that in this state our concept of due process of law prohibits it."

=== Later years ===
In 1970, Moore was asked to write and update the Colorado Criminal Code. In 1971, Moore helped with the creation of the Sam Cary Bar Association, a group for African-American Lawyers.

He served as an assistant Denver District Attorney from 1973 to 1983 at the request of the elected Denver District Attorney Dale Tooley. When Tooley resigned to run for Denver mayor in 1983, Moore continued in the office under Norman Early. Moore worked for two more years, and then retired at the age of 89 in May 1985.

== Personal life ==
Shortly before he was drafted into the Army, Moore met Ruth Dye of Julesburg, Colorado, they corresponded while he was overseas and they were married in 1919. Moore and wife had one child together, Loahna Moore Chandler, who was born in 1926.

Moore was a member of Veterans of Foreign Wars, Freemasons, Phi Delta Phi, and Sigma Alpha Epsilon. He served two terms as president of the University of Denver Alumni Association. He was active in many civic and fraternal organizations. He was an honorary 33 degree Scottish Rite Mason and a member of the El Jebel Shriners in Denver.

Moore's wife, Ruth, died in 1986. Moore died of natural causes on December 10, 1990. He is buried at Fairmount Cemetery in Denver.
