= Lafayette Township, Floyd County, Indiana =

Lafayette Township
- Township
- Nickname: Floyds Knobs
- Location of Lafayette Township in Floyd County
- Coordinates: 38°21′37″N 85°52′54″W
- Country: United States
- State: Indiana
- County: Floyd

Government
  - Type: Indiana township

Area
  - Total: 26.23 sq mi (67.9 km^{2})
  - Land: 26.06 sq mi (67.5 km^{2})
  - Water: 0.16 sq mi (0.41 km^{2})
- Elevation: 925 ft (282 m)

Population (2020)
  - Total: 8,199
  - Density: 285.8/sq mi (110.3/km^{2})
- Postal code: 47119
- Area code: 812
- FIPS code: 18-40734
- GNIS feature ID: 453531

Lafayette Township is one of five townships in Floyd County, Indiana. As of the 2010 census, its population was 7,449 and it contained 2,856 housing units, although it remains one of the two townships in the county without an incorporated community, along with Franklin Township.

== Geography ==
According to the 2010 census, the township has a total area of 26.23 square miles (67.9 km^{2}), of which 26.06 square miles (67.5 km^{2}) (or 99.35%) is land and 0.16 square miles (0.41 km^{2}) (or 0.61%) is water. State Senate District 46, US Congress District 9, State Representative District 72, Indiana Department of Homeland Security District 9.

=== Unincorporated communities ===
- Floyds Knobs

=== Adjacent townships ===
- Carr Township, Clark County (northeast)
- New Albany Township (southeast)
- Georgetown Township (southwest)
- Greenville Township (west)
- Wood Township, Clark County (northwest)

=== Major highways ===
- Interstate 64
- U.S. Route 150
