= New Albany Township, Floyd County, Indiana =

New Albany Township
- Township
- Location of New Albany Township in Floyd County
- Coordinates: 38°18′45″N 85°49′56″W
- Country: United States
- State: Indiana
- County: Floyd

Government
  - Type: Indiana township

Area
  - Total: 38.95 sq mi (100.9 km^{2})
  - Land: 38.46 sq mi (99.6 km^{2})
  - Water: 0.49 sq mi (1.3 km^{2})
- Elevation: 453 ft (138 m)

Population (2020)
  - Total: 52,005
  - Density: 1,280.7/sq mi (494.5/km^{2})
- FIPS code: 18-52344
- GNIS feature ID: 453660

New Albany Township is one of five townships in Floyd County, Indiana. As of the 2010 census, its population was 49,252 and it contained 22,226 housing units.

== Geography ==
According to the 2010 census, the township has a total area of 38.95 square miles (100.9 km^{2}), of which 38.46 square miles (99.6 km^{2}) (or 98.74%) is land and 0.49 square miles (1.3 km^{2}) (or 1.26%) is water. Bills Lakes is in this township.

=== Cities and towns ===
- New Albany

=== Unincorporated towns ===
- Blackiston Mill
- Capperas Banks (extinct)
- Graysville
- Saint Joseph
- Silver Hills

(This list is based on USGS data and may include former settlements.)

=== Adjacent townships ===
- Carr Township, Clark County (north)
- Silver Creek Township, Clark County (northeast)
- Jeffersonville Township, Clark County (east)
- Franklin Township (southwest)
- Georgetown Township (west)
- Lafayette Township (northwest)

=== Major highways ===
- Interstate 64
- Interstate 265
- U.S. Route 460
- Indiana State Road 62
- Indiana State Road 111
- Indiana State Road 311

=== Cemeteries ===
The township contains six cemeteries: Fairview, Graceland, Holy Trinity, New Albany National, Saint Marys and West Haven.
