= WNAS =

High school radio station in New Albany/Floyd County, Indiana

- New Albany, Indiana; United States
- Broadcast area: Louisville, Kentucky
- Frequency: 88.1 FM

Programming
- Format: High School

Ownership
- Owner: New Albany/Floyd County Consolidated Schools

History
- First air date: May 28, 1949
- Call sign meaning: New Albany High School

Technical information
- Licensing authority: FCC
- Facility ID: 48372
- Class: A
- ERP: 2,850 watts
- HAAT: 1 meter (3.28 ft)
- Transmitter coordinates: 38°17′56″N 85°48′45″W

Links
- Public license information: Public file; LMS
- Website: wnas.org

WNAS (88.1 FM) is the student-run high school radio station of New Albany High School and Floyd Central High School in southern Indiana, (along with WNAS-TV). The station's call letters, WNAS, reflect the ownership by the New Albany Floyd County School Corporation. The first FM student-run high school radio station to be licensed by the Federal Communications Commission (FCC), WNAS has been broadcasting live since May 28, 1949.

== History ==
WNAS (88.1 FM) has been broadcasting live since the spring of 1949, when its first broadcast was of the New Albany High School commencement ceremony. It was the first FM student-run high school radio station to be licensed by the Federal Communications Commission (FCC). WNAS is the student-run high school radio station of New Albany High School and Floyd Central High School in southern Indiana. The station's call letters reflect the ownership by the New Albany Floyd County School Corporation. In 1980, the corporation also began broadcasting WNAS-TV.

=== Management ===
Assistant Principal Marvin Oakes guided WNAS through its formative years. Robert Willman, an English teacher, assumed the management role in 1954. Jerry Weaver served as the general manager from 1960 to 1969, followed later by Lee Kelly who held this post from 1973 to 2013. Jason Flener, former assistant principal for NAHS, and a former WNAS student staff member, replaced Kelly beginning in the 2013–14 school year. From the beginning of the 2017–18 school year to the 2023–24 school year, Brian Sullivan was the general manager. From the beginning of the 2024 school year to the end of the 2025–26 school year, Madeline Fisher was the general manager. Nathan Samsel currently resides as general manager, beginning in the 2026–27 school year. The past three general managers of WNAS at New Albany High School were all alumni, as well as Mr. Samsel. For a brief period of time, former North Oldham program director Joe Biega headed the Floyd Central program, but left after 1 year in the program serving from 2023 to 2024. Floyd Central's program is currently headed by Tim Dench, who was the former program director, but left temporarily to join 98.5 WHJI at Jeffersonville High School. He returned to Floyd Central in 2024.

=== Studio ===
Recently, Floyd Central completed entire renovations of its TV and radio studios. These studios are considered by many local TV and radio personalities to be better than their own. Sarah Jordan of 99.7 WDJX even told students at Floyd Central, "Become a part of the Radio/TV program because the stuff you all are using is a lot better than what I have."

== Programming ==
WNAS can be picked up throughout all of the Louisville metropolitan area and is known for its electric programming. The station broadcasts music 24 hours a day when it's not covering boys and girls basketball, football, baseball, and volleyball for both New Albany and Floyd Central. The station also provides streaming audio from its website and through their TuneIn feed.
