= Sellersburg, Indiana =

Town of Sellersburg
- Town
- Seal Logo
- Motto: "Proud of our past, in touch with the future"
- Location of Sellersburg in Clark County, Indiana.
- Coordinates: 38°23′13″N 85°45′27″W
- Country: United States
- State: Indiana
- County: Clark
- Townships: Silver Creek, Carr

Government
  - Type: Town Council
  - Councilmen: Mark Grube, Randall Mobley, Brad Amos, Terry Langford, Matthew Czarnecki
  - Town Manager: Charlie Smith

Area
  - Total: 7.47 sq mi (19.35 km^{2})
  - Land: 7.41 sq mi (19.20 km^{2})
  - Water: 0.062 sq mi (0.16 km^{2})
- Elevation: 515 ft (157 m)

Population (2020)
  - Total: 9,310
  - Density: 1,256.2/sq mi (485.01/km^{2})
- Time zone: UTC-5 (Eastern (EST))
  - Summer (DST): UTC-4 (EDT)
- ZIP code: 47172
- Area codes: 812 & 930
- FIPS code: 18-68670
- GNIS feature ID: 2396911
- Website: www.sellersburg.org

Sellersburg is a town located within Silver Creek and Carr Townships, Clark County, Indiana, United States. It had a population of 9,310 at the time of the 2020 census. Sellersburg is located along Interstate 65, about 15 minutes north of Louisville.

== History ==
Sellersburg takes its name from its founder, Moses Sellers, who laid out the town in 1846. Sellersburg was incorporated in 1890. The first post office at Sellersburg was established in 1854, at which time the name was spelled Sellersburgh.

Silver Creek High School's boys' basketball team won the 2019 and 2021 IHSAA 3-A state championships.

Silver Creek High School's Boys' Baseball team won the 2023 IHSAA 3-A state championship.

== Geography ==
According to the 2010 census, Sellersburg has a total area of 7.47 square miles (19.35 km^{2}), of which 7.41 square miles (19.19 km^{2}) (or 99.19%) is land and 0.06 square miles (0.16 km^{2}) (or 0.8%) is water.

== Demographics ==
Historical population
Census	Pop.	Note	%±
1880	169		—
1890	508		200.6%
1900	761		49.8%
1910	676		−11.2%
1920	915		35.4%
1930	1,050		14.8%
1940	1,121		6.8%
1950	1,664		48.4%
1960	2,679		61.0%
1970	3,177		18.6%
1980	3,211		1.1%
1990	5,745		78.9%
2000	6,071		5.7%
2010	6,128		0.9%
2020	9,310		51.9%
U.S. Decennial Census

=== 2020 census ===
As of the 2020 census, Sellersburg had a population of 9,310. The median age was 38.5 years. 25.2% of residents were under the age of 18 and 16.1% of residents were 65 years of age or older. For every 100 females there were 95.2 males, and for every 100 females age 18 and over there were 92.4 males age 18 and over.

96.2% of residents lived in urban areas, while 3.8% lived in rural areas.

There were 3,530 households in Sellersburg, of which 35.2% had children under the age of 18 living in them. Of all households, 52.3% were married-couple households, 15.8% were households with a male householder and no spouse or partner present, and 23.9% were households with a female householder and no spouse or partner present. About 23.1% of all households were made up of individuals and 9.9% had someone living alone who was 65 years of age or older.

There were 3,716 housing units, of which 5.0% were vacant. The homeowner vacancy rate was 1.6% and the rental vacancy rate was 6.0%.

Racial composition as of the 2020 census
Race	Number	Percent
White	8,040	86.4%
Black or African American	156	1.7%
American Indian and Alaska Native	57	0.6%
Asian	98	1.1%
Native Hawaiian and Other Pacific Islander	3	0.0%
Some other race	381	4.1%
Two or more races	575	6.2%
Hispanic or Latino (of any race)	661	7.1%

=== 2010 census ===
As of the census of 2010, there were 6,128 people, 2,443 households, and 1,697 families living in the town. The population density was 1,555.3 inhabitants per square mile (600.5/km^{2}). There were 2,595 housing units at an average density of 658.6 per square mile (254.3/km^{2}). The racial makeup of the town was 94.2% White, 0.8% African American, 0.3% Native American, 0.3% Asian, 2.9% from other races, and 1.6% from two or more races. Hispanic or Latino of any race were 5.5% of the population.

There were 2,443 households, of which 33.7% had children under the age of 18 living with them, 50.6% were married couples living together, 13.2% had a female householder with no husband present, 5.6% had a male householder with no wife present, and 30.5% were non-families. 26.2% of all households were made up of individuals, and 10.4% had someone living alone who was 65 years of age or older. The average household size was 2.48 and the average family size was 2.96.

The median age in the town was 38 years. 24.6% of residents were under the age of 18; 8.3% were between the ages of 18 and 24; 26.1% were from 25 to 44; 26.4% were from 45 to 64; and 14.7% were 65 years of age or older. The gender makeup of the town was 48.6% male and 51.4% female.

=== 2000 census ===
As of the census of 2000, there were 6,072 people, 2,407 households, and 1,757 families living in the town. The population density was 1,515.8 inhabitants per square mile (585.3/km^{2}). There were 2,535 housing units at an average density of 632.9 per square mile (244.4/km^{2}). The racial makeup of the town was 98.48% White, 1.04% Hispanic or Latino of any race, 0.28% Native American, 0.25% African American, 0.16% Asian, 0.02% Pacific Islander, 0.28% from other races, and 0.53% from two or more races.

There were 2,407 households, out of which 33.0% had children under the age of 18 living with them, 57.0% were married couples living together, 11.8% had a female householder with no husband present, and 27.0% were non-families. 23.3% of all households were made up of individuals, and 7.2% had someone living alone who was 65 years of age or older. The average household size was 2.50 and the average family size was 2.92.

In the town, the population was spread out, with 24.5% under the age of 18, 8.4% from 18 to 24, 30.8% from 25 to 44, 23.4% from 45 to 64, and 12.8% who were 65 years of age or older. The median age was 37 years. For every 100 females, there were 92.6 males. For every 100 females age 18 and over, there were 89.3 males.

The median income for a household in the town was $39,832, and the median income for a family was $46,512. Males had a median income of $30,977 versus $21,974 for females. The per capita income for the town was $18,648. About 4.1% of families and 5.3% of the population were below the poverty line, including 8.2% of those under age 18 and 2.6% of those age 65 or over.

== Education ==
Silver Creek School Corporation operates a primary, elementary, middle, and high school in Sellersburg.

Silver Creek School Corporation was created after the West Clark Community Schools board voted unanimously to permit the divorce of Silver Creek schools from the district on November 9, 2017.

Sellersburg has a public library, a branch of the Charlestown-Clark County Public Library. A campus of Ivy Tech Community College is also located in Sellersburg.

== Politics ==
In December 2021, local residents of Sellersburg formed a grassroots political movement called "Keep Sellersburg Small" in response to rapid growth, commercialization, and development of multi-family housing in the area. Many residents have complained about excessive traffic due to these issues and have called on the Town Council of Sellersburg to limit the growth.

== Infrastructure ==
=== Transportation ===
In the early 1980s the Clark Regional Airport was constructed, a regional airport supporting small and mid-size aircraft.

== Notable people ==
- Will Kimmel - NASCAR and ARCA driver
- Trey Kaufman-Renn - Purdue Boilermakers Basketball Player
