= Wood Township, Clark County, Indiana =

Wood Township
- Township
- Location of Wood Township in Clark County
- Coordinates: 38°27′25″N 85°55′45″W
- Country: United States
- State: Indiana
- County: Clark

Government
  - Type: Indiana township

Area
  - Total: 38.97 sq mi (100.9 km^{2})
  - Land: 38.83 sq mi (100.6 km^{2})
  - Water: 0.13 sq mi (0.34 km^{2})
- Elevation: 545 ft (166 m)

Population (2020)
  - Total: 2,766
  - Density: 70.7/sq mi (27.3/km^{2})
- FIPS code: 18-85166
- GNIS feature ID: 454063

Wood Township is one of twelve townships in Clark County, Indiana. As of the 2010 census, its population was 2,747 and it contained 1,148 housing units.

== History ==
Wood Township was named for George Wood, a pioneer settler.

== Geography ==
According to the 2010 census, the township has a total area of 38.97 square miles (100.9 km^{2}), of which 38.83 square miles (100.6 km^{2}) (or 99.64%) is land and 0.13 square miles (0.34 km^{2}) (or 0.33%) is water. It is 11 miles NW of Louisville, KY.

=== Cities and towns ===
- Borden

=== Unincorporated towns ===
- Chestnut Hill
- Pulltight
- Starlight

(This list is based on USGS data and may include former settlements.)

=== Adjacent townships ===
- Polk Township, Washington County (north)
- Monroe Township (northeast)
- Carr Township (east)
- Lafayette Township, Floyd County (southeast)
- Greenville Township, Floyd County (southwest)
- Jackson Township, Washington County (west)

=== Major highways ===
- Indiana State Road 60

=== Cemeteries ===
The township contains several cemeteries: African-American Cemetery near Daisy Hill Cemetery, Borden Town, Daisy Hill, Dow, Emmanuel, Fisher, Gibson, Goss, Goss II, Gruen, Hallett, Johnson, McKinley-Packwood, New Chapel, Newman/Fisher, Pleasant Ridge, Robertson, St. John the Baptist Catholic Church, Walnut Hill, Whitson, and Wood.
