= Carwood, Indiana =

Unincorporated community in Indiana, United States

Carwood
- Unincorporated community
- Clark County's location in Indiana

- Location in Clark County
- Coordinates: 38°26′54″N 85°51′50″W
- Country: United States
- State: Indiana
- County: Clark
- Township: Carr
- Elevation: 502 ft (153 m)
- ZIP code: 47106
- FIPS code: 18-10630
- GNIS feature ID: 432202

Carwood is an unincorporated community in Carr Township, Clark County, Indiana.

== History ==
It was previously known as Muddyfork or Muddy Fork after the stream that flows through the town. The post office was established as Muddy Fork in 1858. The post office was renamed Carwood in 1902, and it was discontinued in 1933. Carwood was likely named for John Carr, a pioneer settler.
