= Broom Hill, Indiana =

Unincorporated community in Indiana, United States

Broom Hill
- Unincorporated community
- Clark County's location in Indiana

- Location in Clark County
- Coordinates: 38°26′56″N 85°52′39″W
- Country: United States
- State: Indiana
- County: Clark
- Township: Carr
- Elevation: 512 ft (156 m)
- ZIP code: 47106
- FIPS code: 18-08272
- GNIS feature ID: 431589

Broom Hill is an unincorporated community in Carr Township, Clark County, Indiana.

== History ==
Broom Hill was founded in 1851 by Thomas Littell who started a business of manufacturing brooms. A post office was established at Broom Hill in 1855, and remained in operation until it was discontinued in 1857.
