= Galena, Indiana =

- Census-designated place
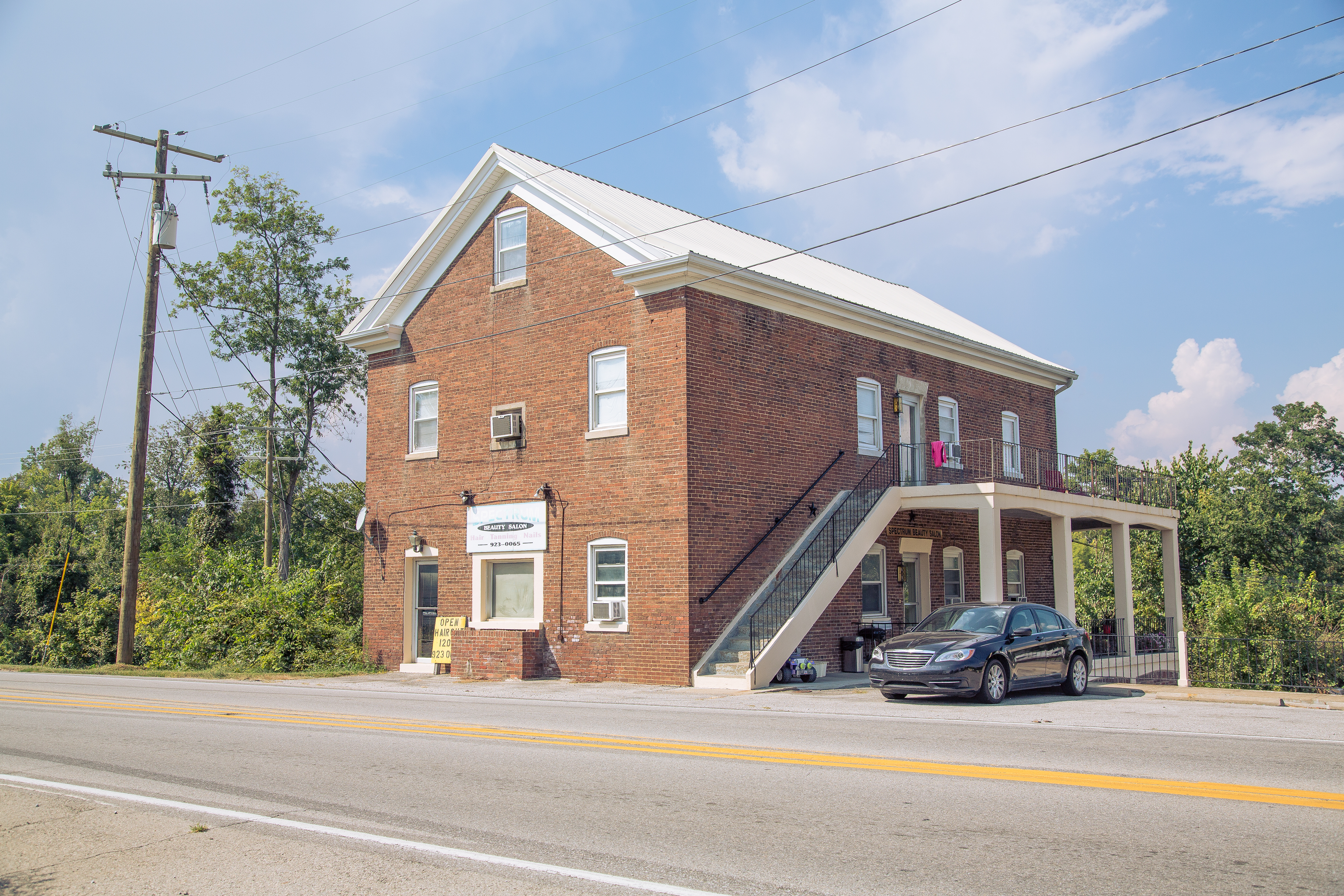

- Location of Galena in Floyd County, Indiana.
- Coordinates: 38°21′2″N 85°56′26″W
- Country: United States
- State: Indiana
- County: Floyd

Area
  - Total: 2.68 sq mi (6.94 km^{2})
  - Land: 2.67 sq mi (6.92 km^{2})
  - Water: 0.0077 sq mi (0.02 km^{2})
- Elevation: 814 ft (248 m)

Population (2020)
  - Total: 1,726
  - Density: 646.2/sq mi (249.49/km^{2})
- Time zone: UTC-5 (Eastern (EST))
  - Summer (DST): UTC-4 (EDT)
- ZIP code: 47119
- Area codes: 812 & 930
- FIPS code: 18-26206
- GNIS feature ID: 0434921

Galena is a census-designated place (CDP) in Floyd County, Indiana, United States. As of the 2020 census, Galena had a population of 1,726. The CDP includes the town of Galena as well as the nearby town of Floyds Knobs and their immediate surroundings.

== History ==
Galena was originally called Germantown, and under the latter name was platted in 1837. A post office was established as Galena in 1843, and remained in operation until it was discontinued in 1933.

== Geography ==
According to the United States Census Bureau, the CDP has a total area of 2.68 square miles (6.94 km^{2}), of which 2.67 square miles (6.92 km^{2}) is land and 0.01 square miles (0.03 km^{2}) is water.

== Demographics ==
Historical population
Census	Pop.	Note	%±
2020	1,726		—
U.S. Decennial Census

=== 2020 census ===
As of the 2020 census, Galena had a population of 1,726. The median age was 41.5 years. 25.1% of residents were under the age of 18 and 14.7% of residents were 65 years of age or older. For every 100 females there were 106.7 males, and for every 100 females age 18 and over there were 103.8 males age 18 and over.

0.0% of residents lived in urban areas, while 100.0% lived in rural areas.

There were 634 households in Galena, of which 28.4% had children under the age of 18 living in them. Of all households, 66.4% were married-couple households, 13.7% were households with a male householder and no spouse or partner present, and 15.1% were households with a female householder and no spouse or partner present. About 18.9% of all households were made up of individuals and 9.3% had someone living alone who was 65 years of age or older.

There were 660 housing units, of which 3.9% were vacant. The homeowner vacancy rate was 1.3% and the rental vacancy rate was 2.5%.

Racial composition as of the 2020 census
Race	Number	Percent
White	1,625	94.1%
Black or African American	11	0.6%
American Indian and Alaska Native	2	0.1%
Asian	19	1.1%
Native Hawaiian and Other Pacific Islander	0	0.0%
Some other race	11	0.6%
Two or more races	58	3.4%
Hispanic or Latino (of any race)	39	2.3%

=== 2010 census ===
As of the census of 2010, there were 1,818 people, 637 households, and 534 families residing in the CDP. The population density was 680.9 inhabitants per square mile (262.9/km^{2}). There were 659 housing units at an average density of 246.8 per square mile (95.3/km^{2}). The racial makeup of the CDP was 98.6% White, 0.2% Native American, 0.6% Asian, 0.1% from other races, and 0.6% from two or more races. Hispanic or Latino of any race were 0.7% of the population.

There were 637 households, of which 42.4% had children under the age of 18 living with them, 68.0% were married couples living together, 10.5% had a female householder with no husband present, 5.3% had a male householder with no wife present, and 16.2% were non-families. 12.9% of all households were made up of individuals, and 4.9% had someone living alone who was 65 years of age or older. The average household size was 2.85 and the average family size was 3.12.

The median age in the CDP was 38.2 years. 27% of residents were under the age of 18; 8.4% were between the ages of 18 and 24; 25.4% were from 25 to 44; 29.5% were from 45 to 64; and 9.8% were 65 years of age or older. The gender makeup of the CDP was 48.8% male and 51.2% female.

=== 2000 census ===
As of the census of 2000, there were 1,831 people, 622 households, and 539 families residing in the CDP. The population density was 691.2 inhabitants per square mile (266.9/km^{2}). There were 638 housing units at an average density of 240.8 per square mile (93.0/km^{2}). The racial makeup of the CDP was 97.87% White, 0.22% African American, 0.38% Native American, 0.66% Asian, 0.16% from other races, and 0.71% from two or more races. Hispanic or Latino of any race were 0.87% of the population.

There were 622 households, out of which 48.2% had children under the age of 18 living with them, 74.3% were married couples living together, 10.0% had a female householder with no husband present, and 13.3% were non-families. 10.9% of all households were made up of individuals, and 2.6% had someone living alone who was 65 years of age or older. The average household size was 2.94 and the average family size was 3.19.

In the CDP, the population was spread out, with 31.7% under the age of 18, 6.1% from 18 to 24, 34.7% from 25 to 44, 21.5% from 45 to 64, and 6.0% who were 65 years of age or older. The median age was 34 years. For every 100 females, there were 95.4 males. For every 100 females age 18 and over, there were 92.2 males.

The median income for a household in the CDP was $60,313, and the median income for a family was $67,569. Males had a median income of $47,455 versus $31,193 for females. The per capita income for the CDP was $23,824. About 3.3% of families and 2.9% of the population were below the poverty line, including 1.4% of those under age 18 and 4.1% of those age 65 or over.

== Education ==
Galena is within the New Albany-Floyd County Consolidated School Corporation.

The western half of Galena is in the attendance boundary of Greenville Elementary School, while the eastern half is assigned to Floyds Knobs Elementary School. All of Galena is within the attendance boundaries of Highland Hills Middle School, and Floyd Central High School.
