= New Albany-Floyd County Consolidated School Corporation =

School district in Indiana, United States

Coordinates: 38.3177°N 85.8216°W

The New Albany-Floyd County Consolidated School Corporation, doing business as New Albany Floyd County Schools (NAFCS), is a school district serving all of Floyd County, Indiana, part of the Louisville metropolitan area. The district headquarters are in New Albany.

== Schools ==
High schools:

- Floyd Central High School (Floyds Knobs, unincorporated area)
- New Albany High School (New Albany)

Middle schools:

- Hazelwood Middle School (New Albany)
- Highland Hills Middle School (unincorporated area, near Georgetown)
- Scribner Middle School (New Albany)

Elementary schools:

- Fairmont Elementary School (New Albany)
- Floyd Knobs Elementary School (Floyds Knobs)
- Georgetown Elementary School (Georgetown)
- Grant Line Elementary School (unincorporated area, near New Albany)
- Green Valley Elementary School (New Albany)
- Greenville Elementary School (Greenville)
- Mt. Tabor Elementary School (New Albany)
- S. Ellen Jones Elementary School (New Albany)
- Slate Run Elementary School (New Albany)

Pre-Kindergarten:

- Early Learning Center (New Albany)

Other schools:

- Prosser Career Center (New Albany)
- Virtual Academy (closed)

== Highland Hills Middle School dress code controversy ==
On August 28, 2019, Highland Hills Middle School's principal, Wendy Ivey, told a female student that the student was not allowed to wear a T-shirt with the text "Why be racist, sexist, homophobic, or transphobic when you can just be quiet?" Administrators called it disruptive. Dozens of students protested. The student went home with her parents rather than change or cover up the shirt.

== See also ==
- List of school districts in Indiana
- Floyd County, Indiana
