= Floyds Knobs, Indiana =

- Unincorporated community
- Location within Indiana Location within the United States
- Coordinates: 38°19′27″N 85°52′26″W
- Country: United States
- State: Indiana
- County: Floyd
- Township: Lafayette
- Elevation: 781 ft (238 m)

Population (2021)
  - Total: 11,412
- ZIP code: 47119
- Area codes: 812 & 930
- FIPS code: 18-23800
- GNIS feature ID: 434618

Floyds Knobs is a small unincorporated community in Lafayette Township, Floyd County, Indiana, United States. Historically a farming community on the outskirts of New Albany, it has since become a bedroom community for Louisville, Kentucky. It contains subdivisions, farms, small shopping centers, churches, a now-closed silver mine, and transmitters for many of the area's television and radio stations. It is also the location of Floyd Central High School, a Gold Star rated school by the Indiana Department of Education. Floyds Knobs has a population of about 11,412 to 12,439.

== History ==
The town was named after Colonel Davis Floyd. James Moore first built a gristmill in the town in 1815. The word "knobs" in the town's name comes from the local terrain. As one approaches Floyds Knobs from the southeast, the Knobstone Escarpment rises 400–850 feet above the Ohio River floodplain along the northwestern edge of New Albany, Indiana. The eroded hills along the edge of this plateau, called "knobs", run the gauntlet of the eastern edge of the Norman Upland geologic area of Indiana. Floyds Knobs is home to PGA golfer Fuzzy Zoeller, as well as Terraria developers Re-Logic.

Historically, the commercial center of the community was at the intersection of Scottsville Road and Paoli Pike, (Old U.S. Highway 150) along the primary route from New Albany to Paoli, Indiana. However, exit 119 on Interstate 64 (US 150) has substantial commercial and residential development west of the historic center.

== Geography ==
Floyds Knobs is located four miles northwest of the Ohio River and downtown New Albany. The geographical area rolls along its topography with a large bluff rising over 750 feet above the lower New Albany, Indiana. The historical Buffalo Trail rides along this bluff on what is now named Paoli Pike. Historically, buffalo used this trail to migrate through the area before later becoming extinct in the area. There are several routes up the bluff's face from New Albany to Floyds Knobs and Lafayette.

== Demographics ==
The United States Census Bureau first delineated Floyds Knobs as a census designated place in the 2022 American Community Survey.

== Education ==
New Albany-Floyd County Consolidated School Corporation serves the community. Residents are assigned to Floyds Knobs Elementary School, Highland Hills Middle School, and Floyd Central High School.

== Notable people ==
- Earl Balmer, racing driver
- Dusty Ray Bottoms, drag queen
- Bo Butner, drag racer
- Gerry Huth, professional football player
- Alli Linnehan, professional volleyball player
- Melinda Loveless, co-perpetrator of the murder of Shanda Sharer
- Zen Michalski, professional football player
- Ostis Otto Moore, lawyer and political figure
- Donna Schaibley, politician
- Fuzzy Zoeller, professional golfer
