= Floyd County, Indiana =

County in Indiana, United States

- County
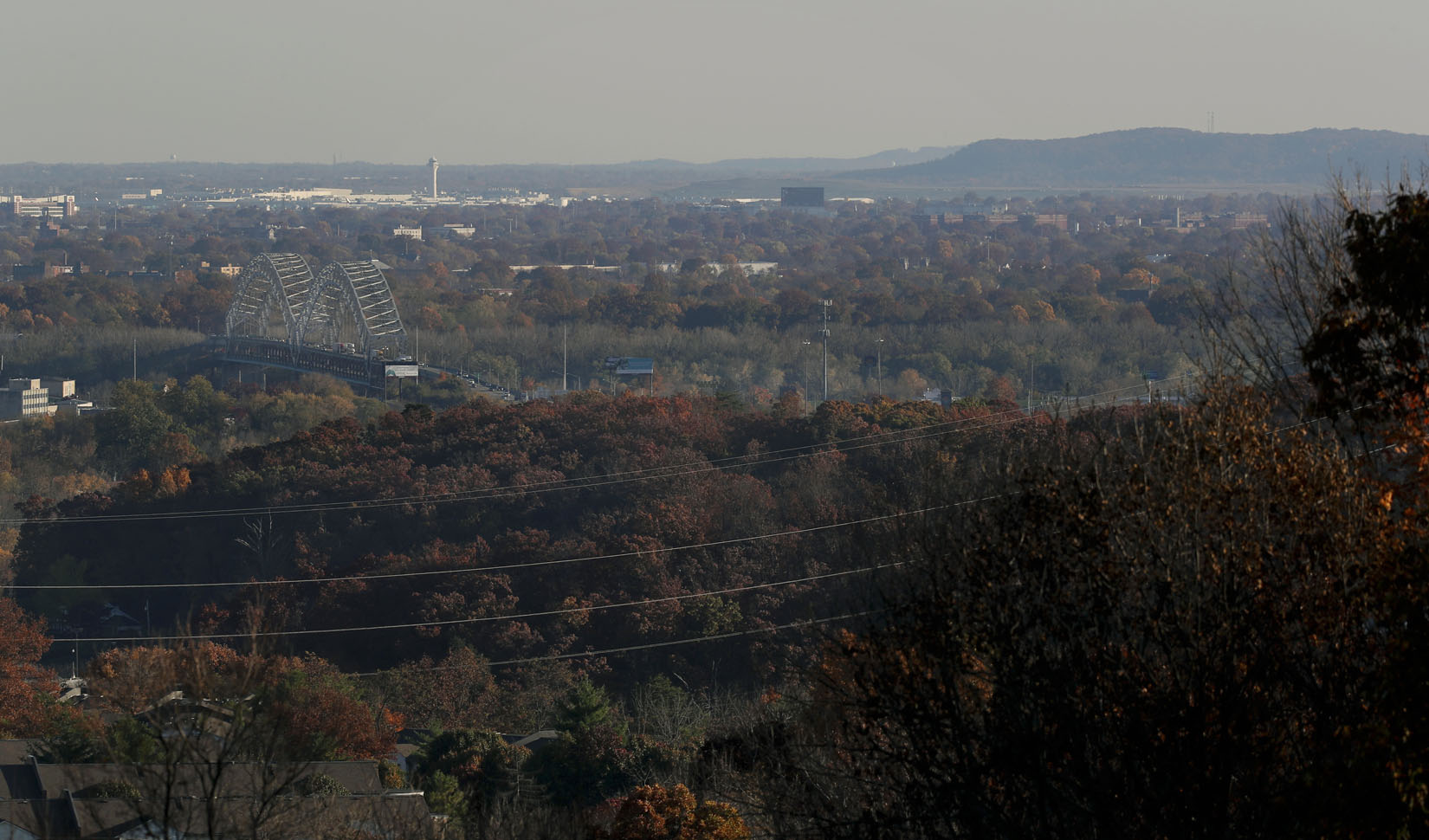
- Floyd County, Indiana

- Location within the U.S. state of Indiana
- Coordinates: 38°19′N 85°54′W
- Country: United States
- State: Indiana
- Founded: 1819
- Named for: John Floyd
- Seat: New Albany
- Largest city: New Albany

Area
  - Total: 148.96 sq mi (385.8 km^{2})
  - Land: 147.94 sq mi (383.2 km^{2})
  - Water: 1.02 sq mi (2.6 km^{2}) 0.68%

Population (2020)
  - Total: 80,484
  - Estimate (2025): 82,153 ▲
  - Density: 544.03/sq mi (210.05/km^{2})
- Time zone: UTC−5 (Eastern)
  - Summer (DST): UTC−4 (EDT)
- Congressional district: 9th
- Website: in.gov/counties/floyd
- Indiana county number 22; Second smallest county in Indiana by area

Floyd County is a county located in the U.S. state of Indiana. Its county seat is New Albany. The population of the county was 80,484 as of the 2020 United States census. Floyd County has the second-smallest land area in the entire state. It was formed in the year 1819 from neighboring Clark and Harrison counties. Floyd County is part of the Louisville/Jefferson County, KY–IN Metropolitan Statistical Area.

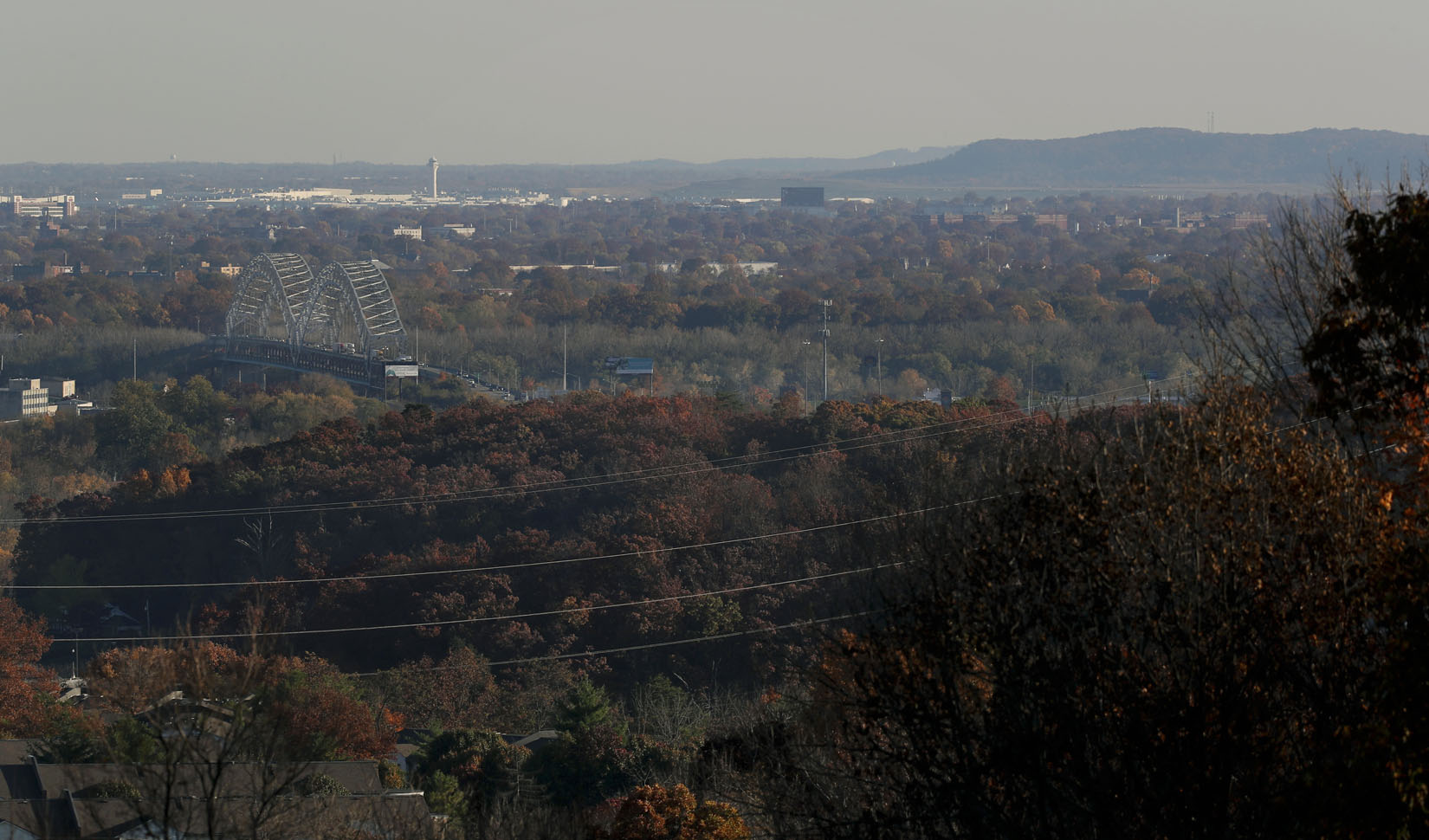
From Floyds Knobs, the view of the Sherman Minton Bridge that crosses the Ohio River and connecting Indiana and Kentucky and the Louisville International Airport in the distance.

== History ==
Floyd County, originally the Shawnee Indians hunting ground, was conquered for the United States by George Rogers Clark during the American Revolutionary War from the British. He was awarded large tracts of land in Indiana, including almost all of present-day Floyd County. Clark sold land to the settlers who began arriving as soon as peace returned.

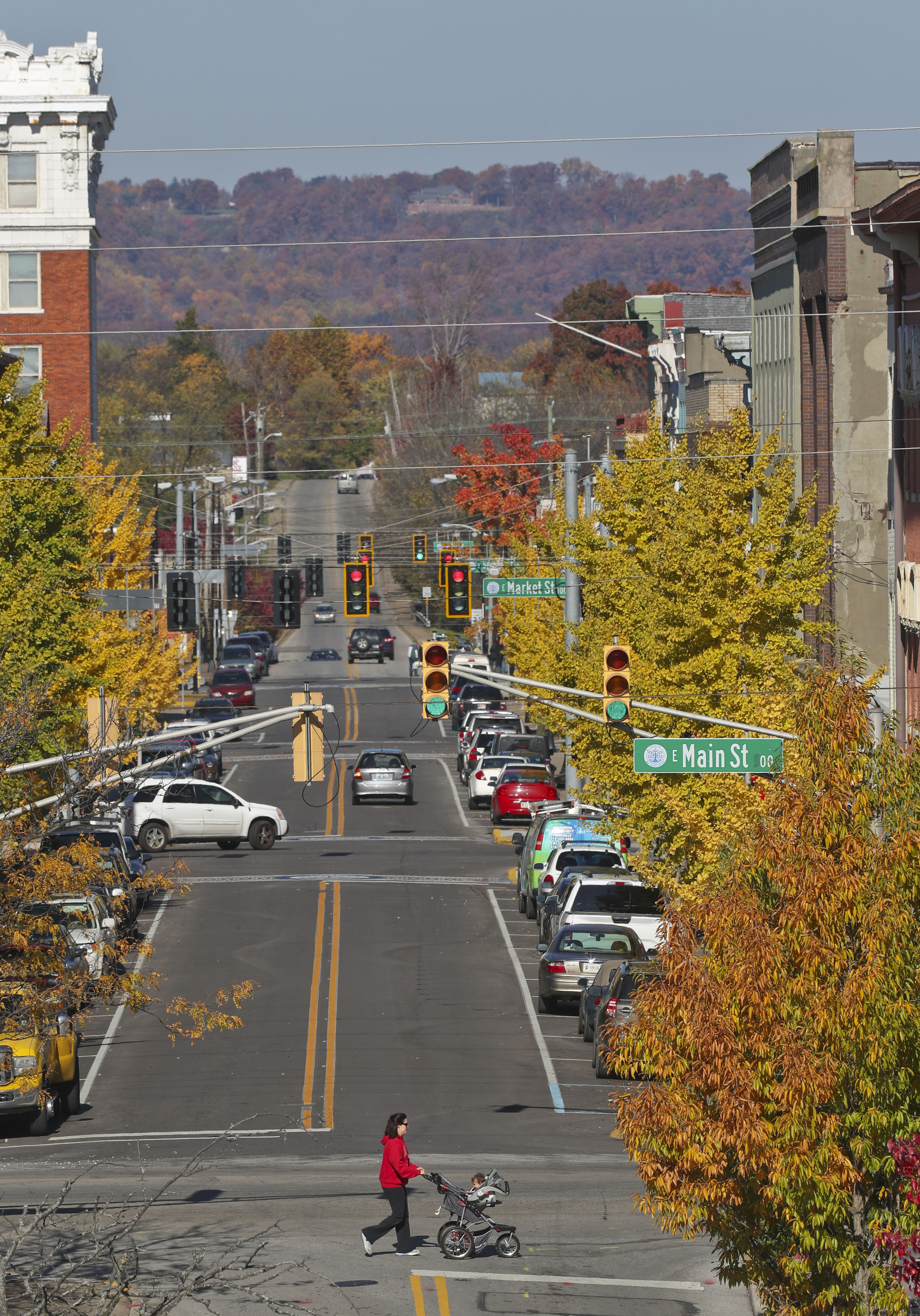
Pearl Street in downtown New Albany. The Knobs can be seen in the distance.

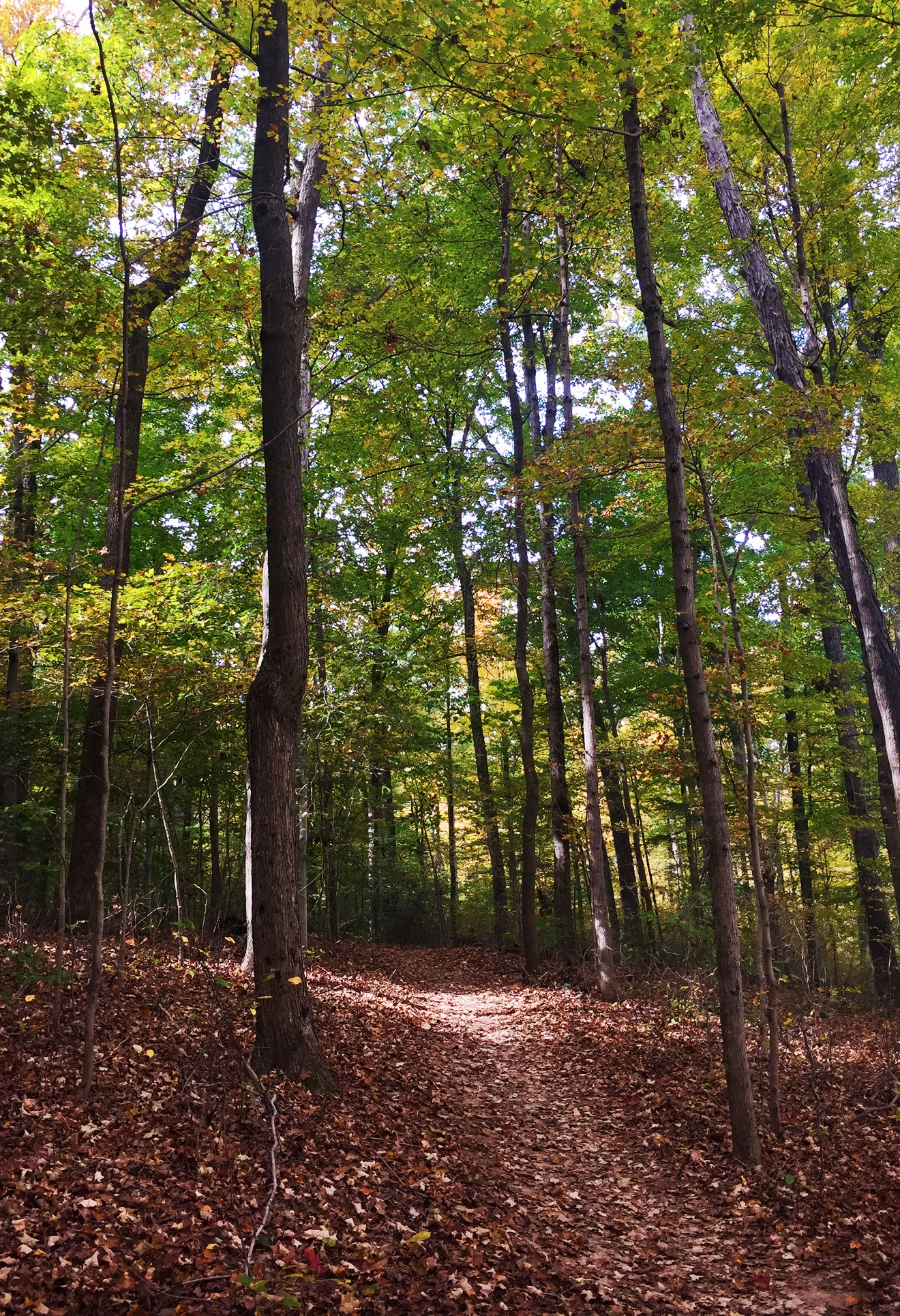
The woods of Mount Saint Francis in Floyds Knobs, Indiana.

In 1818, New Albany was large enough to become a county seat and form a new county. New Albany leaders sent Nathaniel Scribner and John K. Graham to the capital at Corydon to petition the General Assembly. Legislation was passed on January 2, 1819, by the General Assembly, and the county was established on February 1. The origin of the county's name is debated. According to the State Library, it was named for John Floyd, a leading Jefferson County, Kentucky pioneer and uncle of Davis Floyd. John Floyd was killed in 1783 when his party was attacked by Indians in Bullitt County, Kentucky. However, some maintain the county was actually named for Davis Floyd, who was convicted of aiding Aaron Burr in the treason of 1809. Davis Floyd had also been a leading local political figure and was the county's first circuit court judge.

In 1814, New Albany was platted and was established as the county seat on March 4, 1819. There was an attempt in 1823 to move the county seat, but the motion failed. New Albany would be the largest city in the state for much of the early 19th century, eventually being overtaken by Indianapolis during the Civil War.

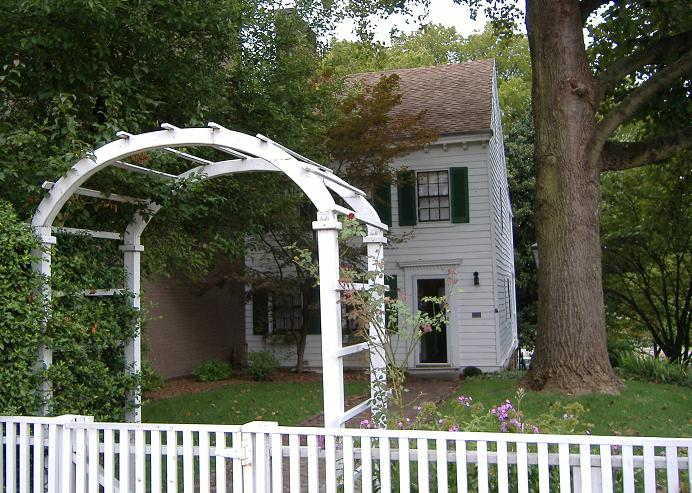
House of Nathaniel Scribner

Between 1800 and 1860, Floyd County experienced a huge boom in population (doubling many times over). A survey in the 1850s found that over half of Indiana's population that made more than $100,000 per year lived in Floyd County, establishing it as having the richest population in the state.

The Duncan Tunnel, the longest tunnel in Indiana, was built in Floyd County in 1881 between New Albany and Edwardsville. Because no route over the Floyds Knobs was suitable for a railroad line, civil engineers decided to tunnel through them. The project was originally started by the Air Line but was completed by Southern Railway. It took five years to bore at a cost of $1 million. The Tunnel is 4,311 feet (1,314 m) long.

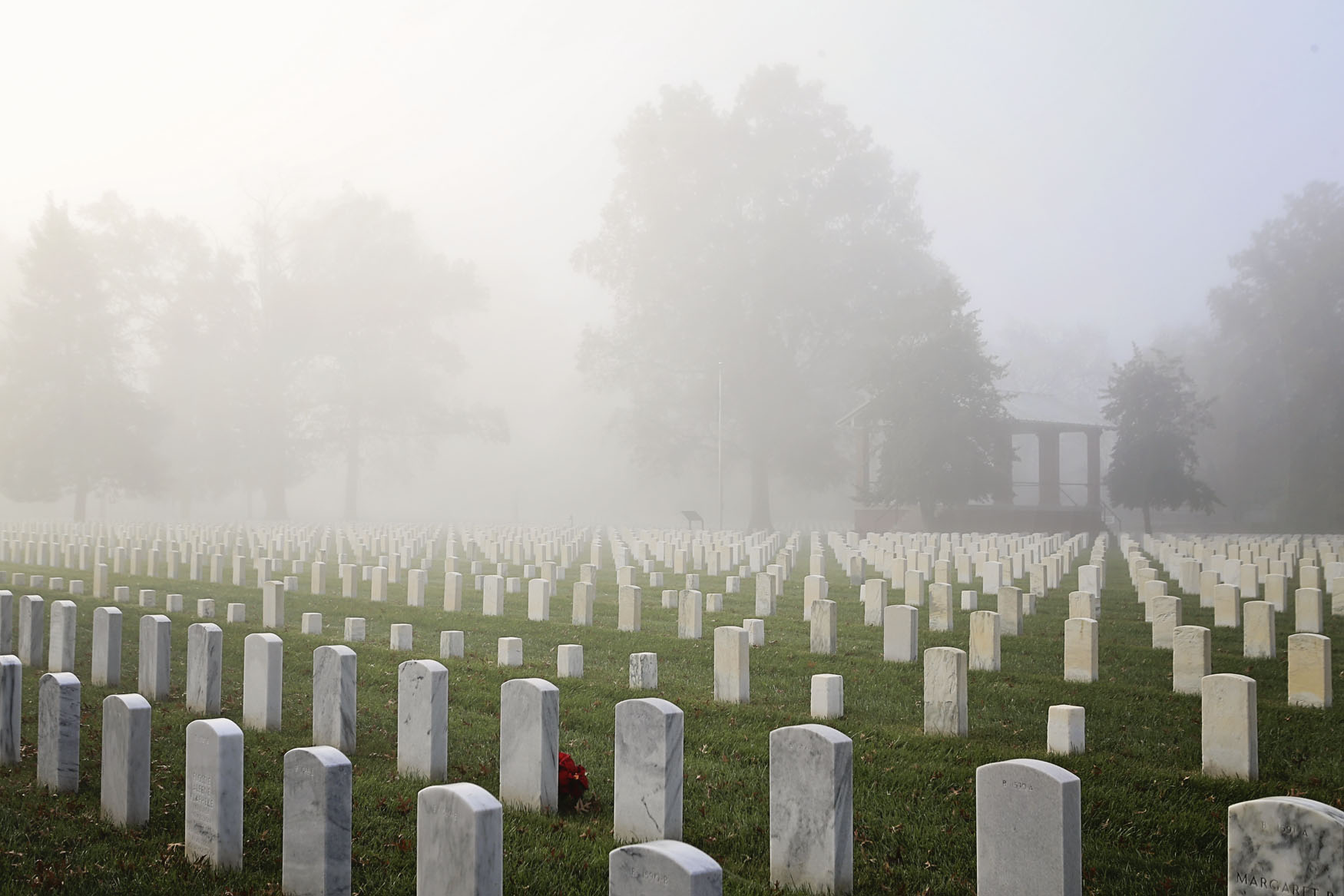
The New Albany National Cemetery was one of the original seven first established in 1862 by Congress. More than 5,000 are buried here, from the Civil War to the Vietnam War.

Floyd County, during the 19th century, attracted immigrants of Irish, German, French and African American origins. The French settlers located mostly in Floyds Knobs, Indiana. The Irish began arriving in 1817 and settled in large numbers between 1830 and 1850. German immigrants settled mostly in New Albany. By 1850, about one in six county residents had been born in other countries. Mount Saint Francis, a multi-purpose complex owned and administered by the Conventual Franciscan Friars of the Province of Our Lady of Consolation, is located in Floyds Knobs along Highway 150. The property includes 400 acres of woods and Mount Saint Francis Lake, both which are open to the public. Numerous hiking trails meander through the woods and fields containing native prairie grasses. No hunting is allowed on the property.

== Geography ==
According to the 2010 census, the county has a total area of 148.96 square miles (385.8 km^{2}), of which 147.94 square miles (383.2 km^{2}) (or 99.32%) is land and 1.02 square miles (2.6 km^{2}) (or 0.68%) is water. It is the second smallest county in area, behind only Ohio County, although significantly more populated.

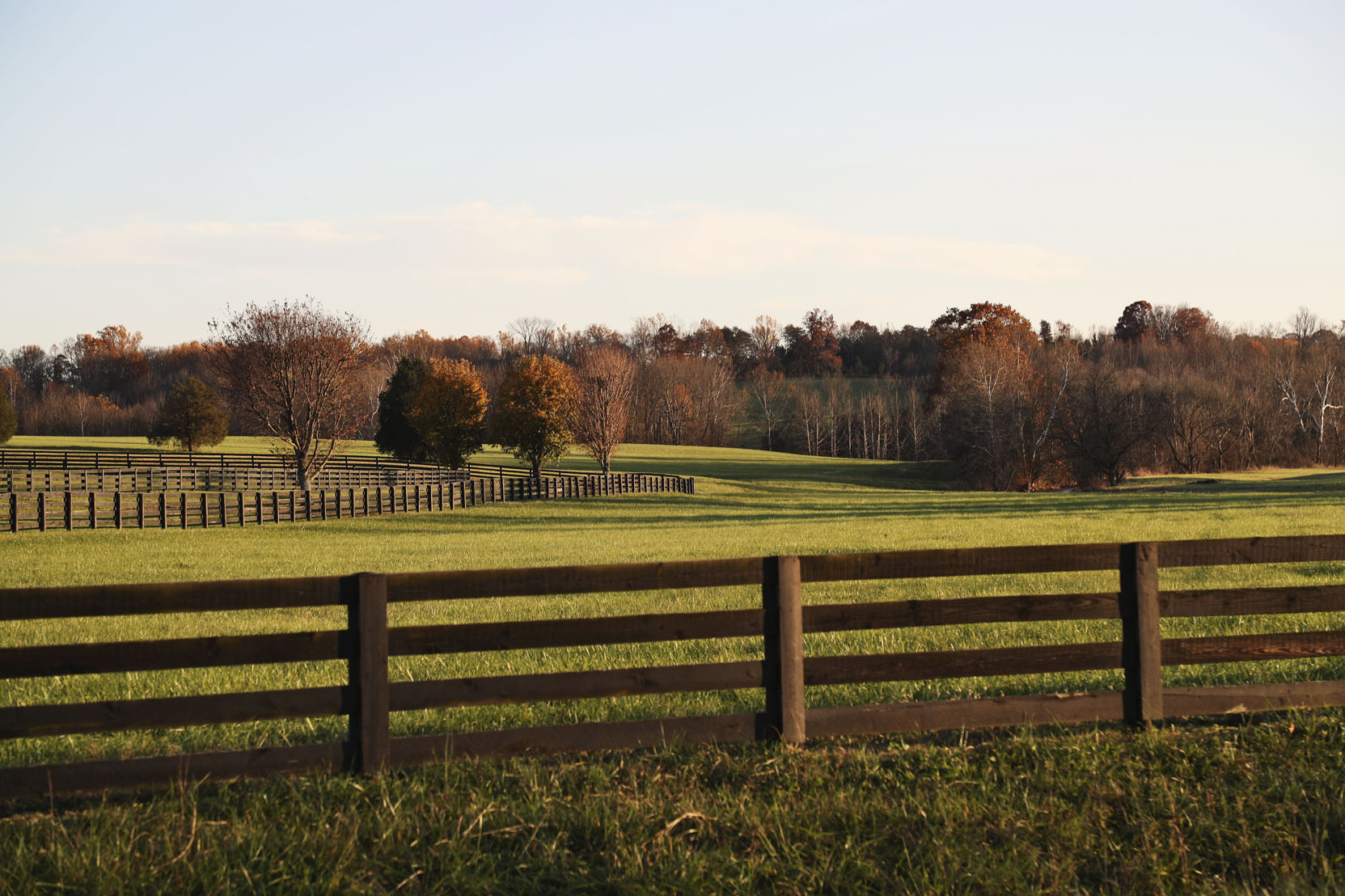
A pasture scene in Greenville, off Georgetown-Greenville Road.

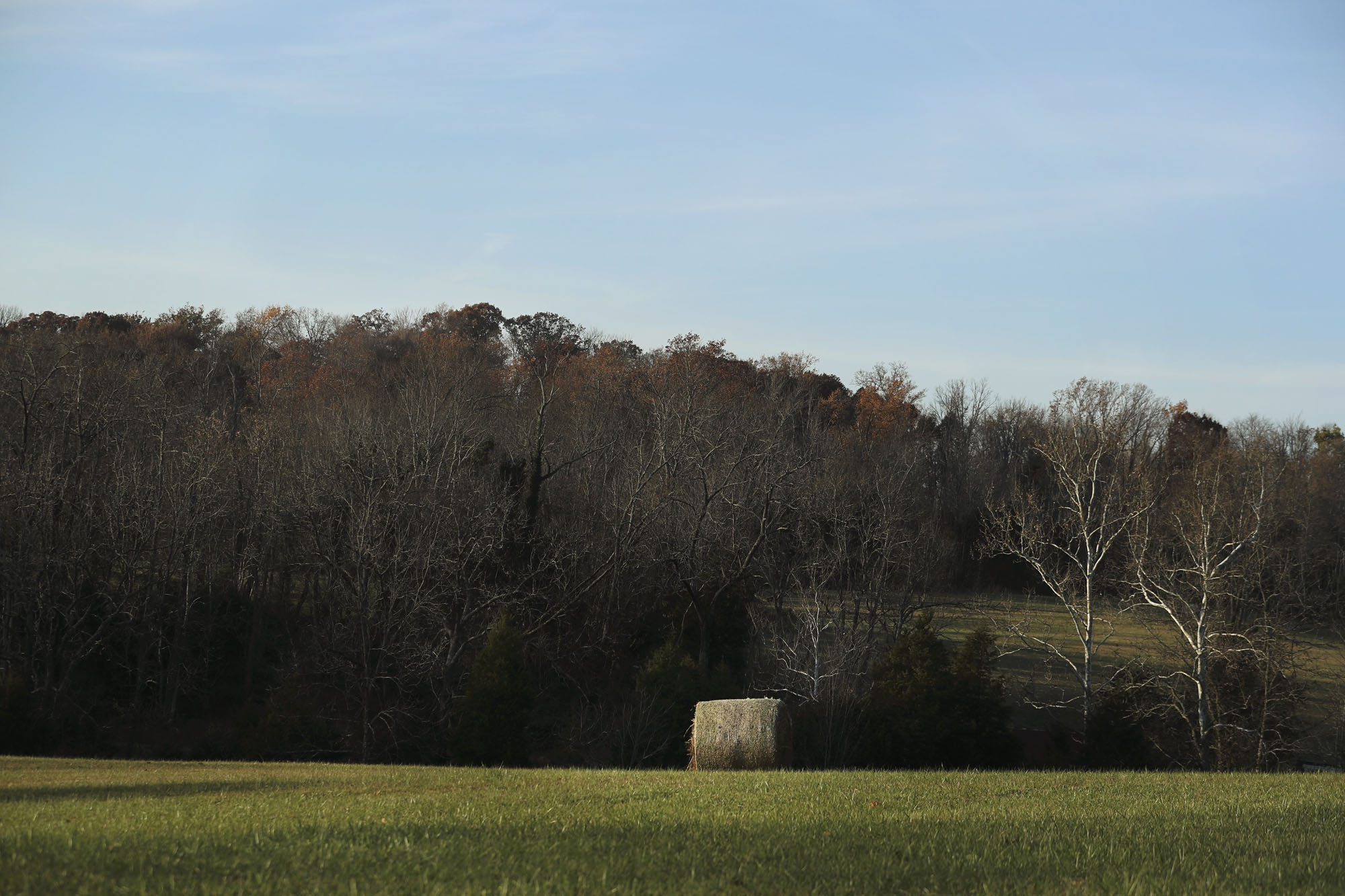
The rolling land of Georgetown features farmland, fields and woods that are dotted with homes and a few subdivisions.

=== City ===
- New Albany

=== Towns ===
- Georgetown
- Greenville

=== Census-designated place ===
- Galena

=== Townships ===
Floyd County is divided into five townships:

- Franklin
- Georgetown
- Greenville
- Lafayette
- New Albany

=== Geographical features ===
The Knobs Unit, which includes Floyd County, contains some of the hilliest country in Indiana. As a result, the area supports trees that prefer very dry sites and ridgetops, as well as those that prefer very wet sites, ravines, or “bottomland.” Tree types unique to the unit include blackjack oak and swamp tupelo. Part of the unit stands on sandstone bedrock; other areas developed over limestone. This difference accommodates a variety of trees and their associated flowering plants and shrubs. Trees found in Floyd County include the Sycamore, Flowering Dogwood, Virginia Pine, Easter Redcedar, American Beech, Sugar Maple, American Elm and Chestnut Oak. The lowest point in the county is the shore of the Ohio River near New Albany at an elevation of 380 ft (120 m).

=== Transit ===
- Transit Authority of River City

=== Major highways ===
- Interstate 64
- Interstate 265
- U.S. Route 150
- Indiana State Road 11
- Indiana State Road 62
- Indiana State Road 64
- Indiana State Road 111
- Indiana State Road 335

=== Adjacent counties ===
- Clark County (northeast)
- Jefferson County, Kentucky (south, across the Ohio River)
- Harrison County (west)
- Washington County (northwest)

== Climate and weather ==
New Albany, Indiana

Climate chart (precipitation, max. and min. temperature)
J	F	M	A	M	J	J	A	S	O	N	D
3.3 41 25	3.3 47 29	4.4 57 37	3.9 67 46	4.9 75 56	3.8 83 65	4.3 87 70	3.4 86 68	3.1 79 61	2.8 68 49	3.8 56 39	3.7 45 30
- █ Average max. and min. temperatures in °F
- █ Precipitation totals in inches
- Source: The Weather Channel
Metric conversion
J	F	M	A	M	J	J	A	S	O	N	D
83 5 −4	83 8 −2	112 14 3	99 19 8	124 24 13	96 28 18	109 31 21	87 30 20	77 26 16	71 20 9	97 13 4	94 7 −1
- █ Average max. and min. temperatures in °C
- █ Precipitation totals in mm

In recent years, average temperatures in New Albany have ranged from a low of 25 °F (−4 °C) in January to a high of 87 °F (31 °C) in July. The record low temperature was −22 °F (−30 °C), recorded in January 1994, and a record high was 107 °F (42 °C), recorded in July 1936. On July 4, 2012, the record for highest temperature in the county was almost broken; the temperature reached 106 °F (41 °C). Average monthly precipitation ranged from 2.79 inches (71 mm) in October of last year to 4.88 inches (124 mm) in May of last year.

== Government ==
The county government is a constitutional body, and is granted specific powers by the Constitution of Indiana and the Indiana Code.

County Council: The county council is the legislative branch of the county government and controls all the spending and revenue collection in the county. Floyd county is divided into 44 precincts which are organized into four districts, each district elects one representative to the council. Three other members are elected to the county at large. The council members serve four-year terms. They are responsible for setting salaries, the annual budget, and special spending. The council also has limited authority to impose local taxes, in the form of an income and property tax that is subject to state level approval, excise taxes, and service taxes.

Board of Commissioners: The executive body of the county is made of a board of commissioners. The commissioners are elected county-wide, in staggered terms, and each serves a four-year term. One of the commissioners, typically the most senior, serves as president. The commissioners are charged with executing the acts legislated by the council, collecting revenue, and managing the day-to-day functions of the county government.

Court: Floyd County's court system consists of a Circuit Court, three Superior Courts and a Magistrate Court.

County Officials: The county has several other elected offices, including sheriff, coroner, auditor, treasurer, recorder, surveyor, and circuit court clerk. Each of these elected officers serves a term of four years and oversees a different part of county government. Members elected to county government positions are required to declare party affiliations and to be residents of the county.

Floyd County has nine public parks within the county, the largest being the 104-acre Sam Peden Community Park in New Albany.

Floyd County is part of Indiana's 9th congressional district and is represented in Congress by Republican Erin Houchin It is also part of Indiana Senate district 46 and Indiana House of Representatives districts 70 and 72.

United States presidential election results for Floyd County, Indiana
Year	Republican		Democratic		Third party(ies)	
Year	No.	%	No.	%	No.	%
1888	2,947	42.88%	3,824	55.65%	101	1.47%
1892	2,958	40.27%	4,219	57.43%	169	2.30%
1896	3,874	51.74%	3,544	47.34%	69	0.92%
1900	3,597	48.22%	3,781	50.69%	81	1.09%
1904	3,666	49.10%	3,421	45.81%	380	5.09%
1908	3,431	43.85%	4,064	51.94%	330	4.22%
1912	669	9.65%	3,236	46.66%	3,031	43.70%
1916	3,200	43.99%	3,850	52.92%	225	3.09%
1920	7,669	49.65%	7,391	47.85%	387	2.51%
1924	6,733	46.50%	6,971	48.15%	775	5.35%
1928	10,471	58.49%	7,327	40.93%	104	0.58%
1932	7,333	40.40%	10,497	57.83%	323	1.78%
1936	6,976	38.50%	10,654	58.79%	491	2.71%
1940	8,056	42.53%	10,799	57.00%	89	0.47%
1944	8,410	44.10%	10,541	55.27%	120	0.63%
1948	8,367	43.76%	10,593	55.40%	161	0.84%
1952	11,608	51.79%	10,368	46.25%	439	1.96%
1956	10,410	55.18%	8,378	44.41%	77	0.41%
1960	11,629	48.38%	12,346	51.36%	62	0.26%
1964	7,834	33.14%	15,656	66.23%	148	0.63%
1968	9,714	40.99%	10,671	45.02%	3,316	13.99%
1972	13,198	58.31%	9,243	40.83%	195	0.86%
1976	11,259	46.42%	12,744	52.54%	252	1.04%
1980	12,456	48.91%	11,543	45.33%	1,468	5.76%
1984	15,466	58.85%	10,616	40.40%	197	0.75%
1988	14,291	56.28%	11,024	43.41%	78	0.31%
1992	11,932	40.24%	13,166	44.40%	4,553	15.36%
1996	12,473	42.90%	13,814	47.52%	2,785	9.58%
2000	16,486	54.90%	13,209	43.99%	335	1.12%
2004	19,877	58.65%	13,857	40.89%	156	0.46%
2008	19,957	54.43%	16,263	44.35%	447	1.22%
2012	19,878	56.17%	14,812	41.85%	702	1.98%
2016	21,432	56.64%	13,945	36.85%	2,465	6.51%
2020	23,400	55.85%	17,511	41.79%	988	2.36%
2024	23,408	56.84%	17,025	41.34%	748	1.82%

== Demographics ==
Historical population
Census	Pop.	Note	%±
1820	2,776		—
1830	6,361		129.1%
1840	9,454		48.6%
1850	14,875		57.3%
1860	20,183		35.7%
1870	23,300		15.4%
1880	24,590		5.5%
1890	29,458		19.8%
1900	30,118		2.2%
1910	30,293		0.6%
1920	30,661		1.2%
1930	34,655		13.0%
1940	35,061		1.2%
1950	43,955		25.4%
1960	51,397		16.9%
1970	55,622		8.2%
1980	61,169		10.0%
1990	64,404		5.3%
2000	70,823		10.0%
2010	74,578		5.3%
2020	80,484		7.9%
2025 (est.)	82,153	▲	2.1%
U.S. Decennial Census; 1790–1960 1900–1990; 1990–2000 2010 2020

=== Racial and ethnic composition ===
Floyd County, Indiana – Racial and ethnic composition Note: the US Census treats Hispanic/Latino as an ethnic category. This table excludes Latinos from the racial categories and assigns them to a separate category. Hispanics/Latinos may be of any race.
Race / Ethnicity (NH = Non-Hispanic)	Pop 1980	Pop 1990	Pop 2000	Pop 2010	Pop 2020	% 1980	% 1990	% 2000	% 2010	% 2020
White alone (NH)	58,452	61,217	65,652	66,505	67,970	95.56%	95.05%	92.70%	89.18%	84.45%
Black or African American alone (NH)	2,168	2,640	3,099	3,822	4,276	3.54%	4.10%	4.38%	5.12%	5.31%
Native American or Alaska Native alone (NH)	39	90	131	146	169	0.06%	0.14%	0.18%	0.20%	0.21%
Asian alone (NH)	109	172	324	694	973	0.18%	0.27%	0.46%	0.93%	1.21%
Native Hawaiian or Pacific Islander alone (NH)	x	x	22	16	21	x	x	0.03%	0.02%	0.03%
Other race alone (NH)	51	31	72	102	246	0.08%	0.05%	0.10%	0.14%	0.31%
Mixed race or Multiracial (NH)	x	x	751	1,321	3,747	x	x	1.06%	1.77%	4.66%
Hispanic or Latino (any race)	350	254	772	1,972	3,082	0.57%	0.39%	1.09%	2.64%	3.83%
Total	61,169	64,404	70,823	74,578	80,484	100.00%	100.00%	100.00%	100.00%	100.00%

=== 2020 census ===
As of the 2020 census, the county had a population of 80,484. The median age was 40.1 years. 22.5% of residents were under the age of 18 and 17.5% of residents were 65 years of age or older. For every 100 females there were 95.0 males, and for every 100 females age 18 and over there were 91.9 males age 18 and over.

The racial makeup of the county was 85.3% White, 5.4% Black or African American, 0.3% American Indian and Alaska Native, 1.2% Asian, <0.1% Native Hawaiian and Pacific Islander, 1.6% from some other race, and 6.1% from two or more races. Hispanic or Latino residents of any race comprised 3.8% of the population.

65.9% of residents lived in urban areas, while 34.1% lived in rural areas.

There were 32,204 households in the county, of which 30.4% had children under the age of 18 living in them. Of all households, 48.5% were married-couple households, 17.5% were households with a male householder and no spouse or partner present, and 26.8% were households with a female householder and no spouse or partner present. About 27.4% of all households were made up of individuals and 11.0% had someone living alone who was 65 years of age or older.

There were 34,344 housing units, of which 6.2% were vacant. Among occupied housing units, 71.5% were owner-occupied and 28.5% were renter-occupied. The homeowner vacancy rate was 1.2% and the rental vacancy rate was 6.4%.

=== 2010 census ===
As of the 2010 United States census, there were 74,578 people, 29,479 households, and 20,264 families residing in the county. The population density was 504.1 inhabitants per square mile (194.6/km^{2}). There were 31,968 housing units at an average density of 216.1 per square mile (83.4/km^{2}). The racial makeup of the county was 90.4% white, 5.2% black or African American, 0.9% Asian, 0.2% American Indian, 1.2% from other races, and 2.1% from two or more races. Those of Hispanic or Latino origin made up 2.6% of the population. In terms of ancestry, 29.4% were German, 15.0% were Irish, 11.0% were English, and 10.6% were American.

Of the 29,479 households, 33.5% had children under the age of 18 living with them, 50.4% were married couples living together, 13.6% had a female householder with no husband present, 31.3% were non-families, and 25.6% of all households were made up of individuals. The average household size was 2.48 and the average family size was 2.98. The median age was 39.1 years.

The median income for a household in the county was $47,697 and the median income for a family was $63,139. Males had a median income of $45,699 versus $33,749 for females. The per capita income for the county was $25,971. About 8.2% of families and 10.8% of the population were below the poverty line, including 16.6% of those under age 18 and 7.7% of those age 65 or over.

== Education ==
New Albany-Floyd County Consolidated School Corporation, doing business as New Albany Floyd County Schools (NAFCS), serves the county. New Albany High School was the first public high school in the state, opening its doors in 1853. The school system has two high schools, New Albany High School and Floyd Central High School, nine elementary schools and three middle schools. The district's enrollment totals approximately 12,000 students in pre-kindergarten through high school programs. The district employs more than 1,200 full-time personnel, which includes approximately 750 teachers, and 375 part-time personnel, according to the 2017 NAFCS website.

All Floyd County residents are eligible to obtain a library card at the New Albany-Floyd County Public Library in New Albany.

There is one university in Floyd County. The Indiana University Southeast campus is located on Grant Line Road in New Albany. The campus spreads over 180 acres (73 ha) just north of I-265 in Southern Indiana. Around 7,000 students attend the school, which is part of the Indiana University system.

== Gallery ==
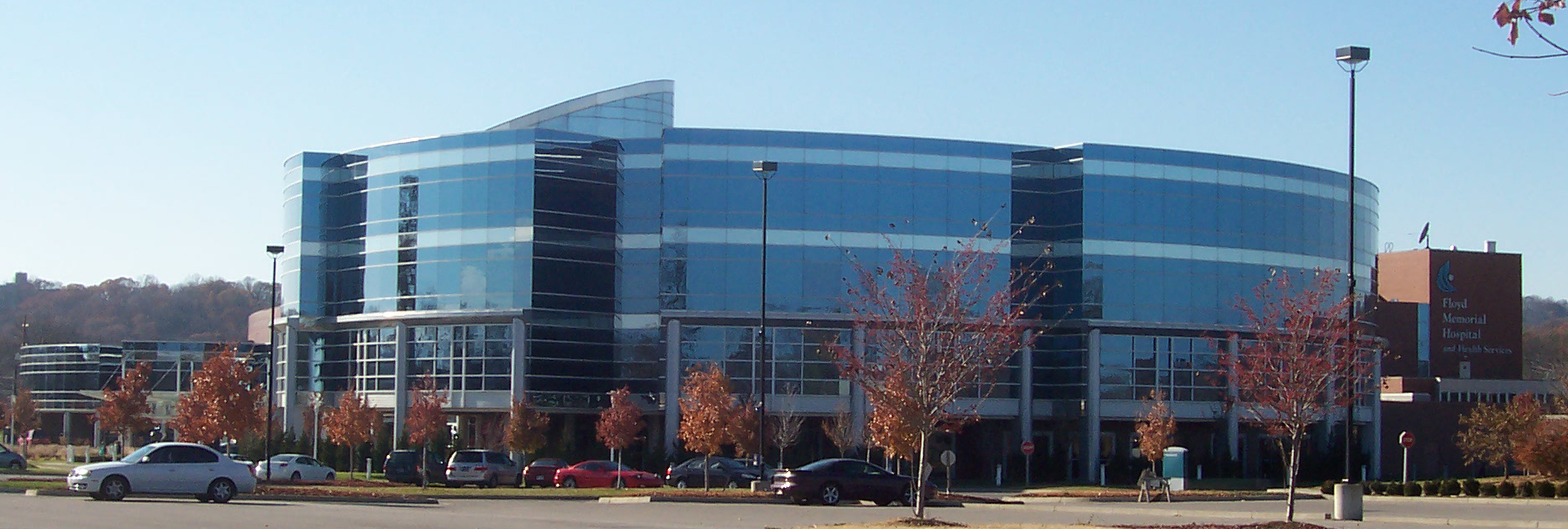
Baptist Floyd Health Hospital

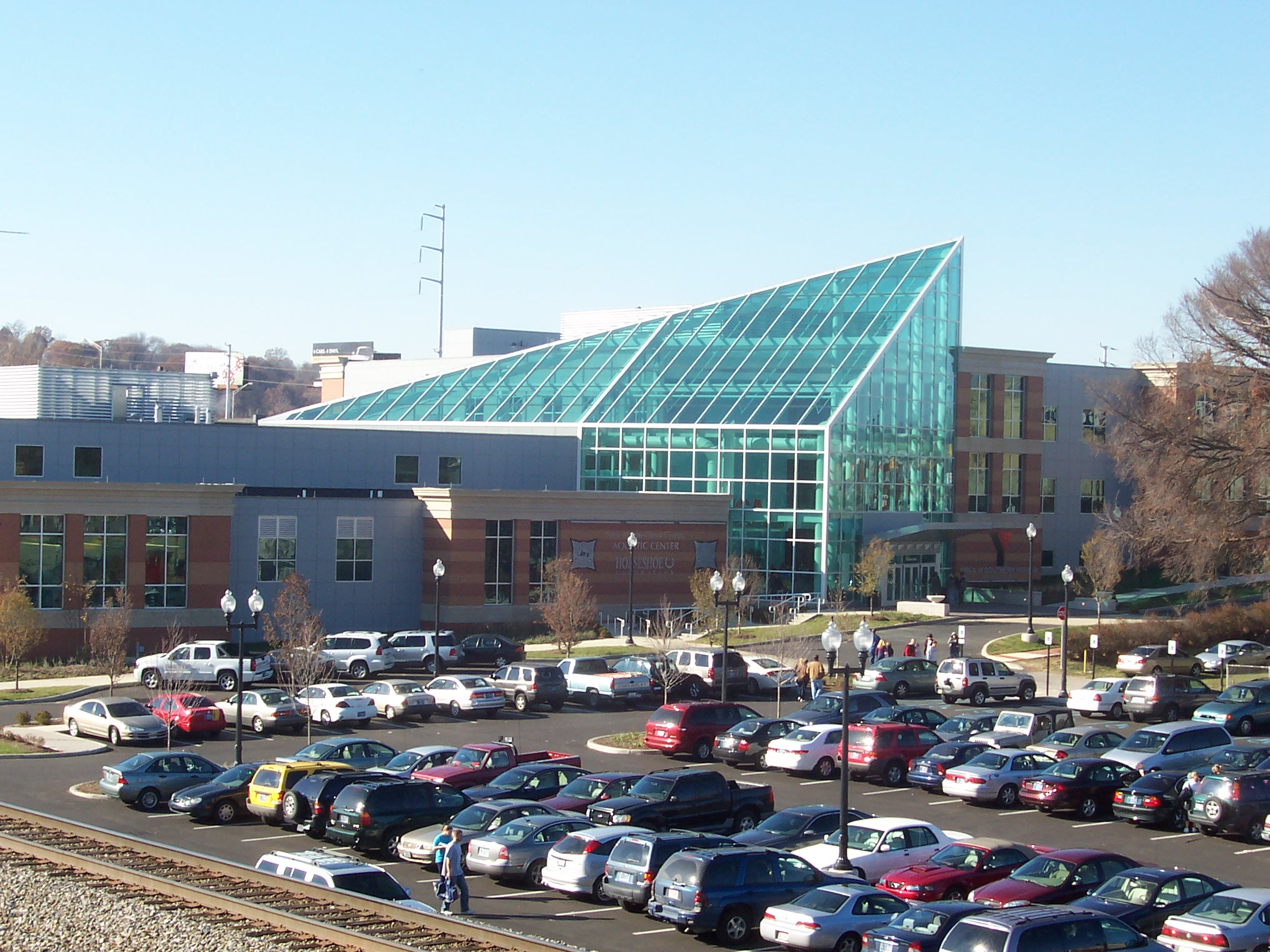
New Albany YMCA building

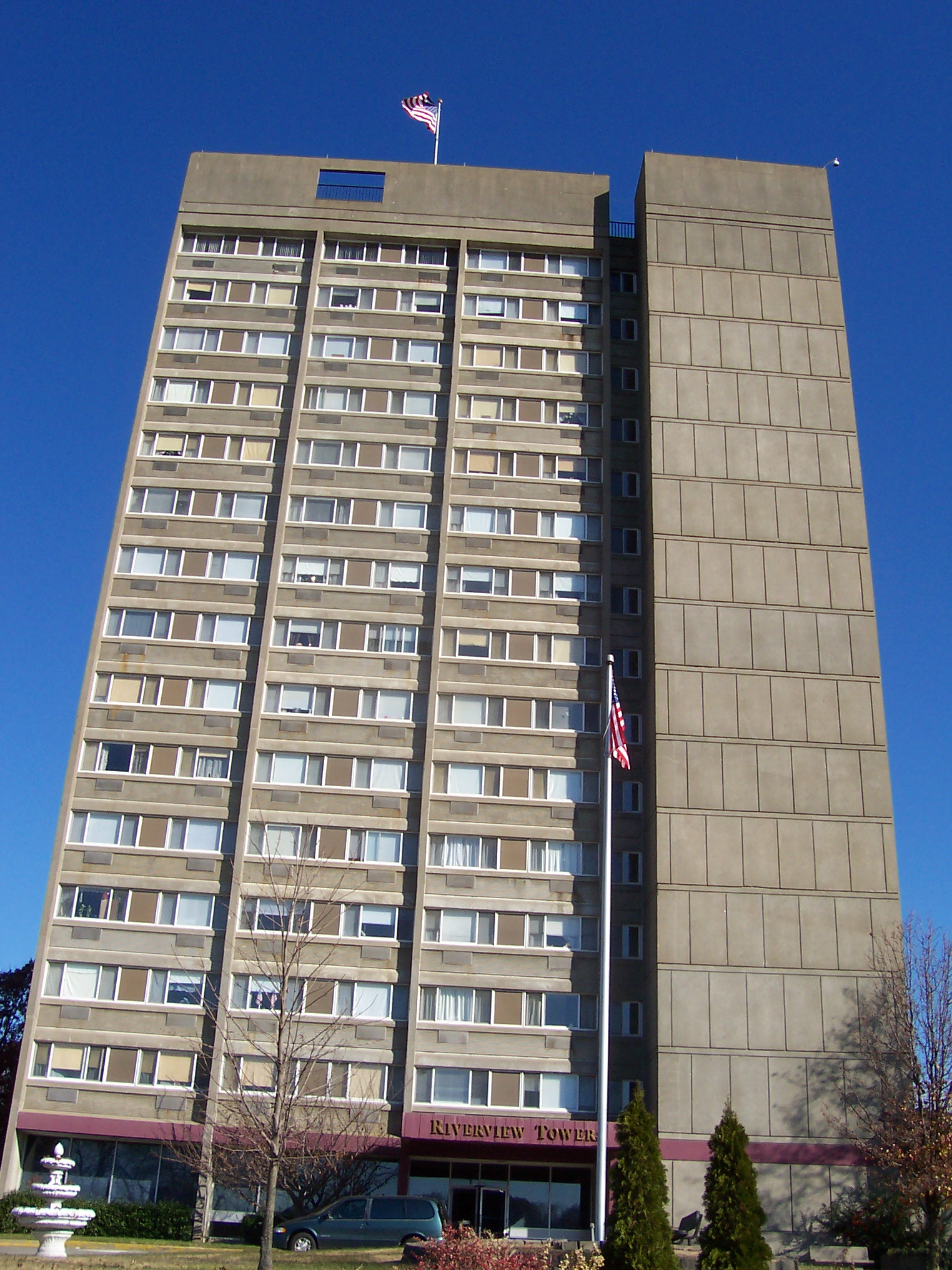
Riverview Towers, was the tallest building in the county before being torn down in 2022

== See also ==
- Indiana University Southeast
- List of public art in Floyd County, Indiana
- Louisville-Jefferson County, KY-IN Metropolitan Statistical Area
- Louisville/Jefferson County–Elizabethtown–Bardstown, KY-IN Combined Statistical Area
- National Register of Historic Places listings in Floyd County, Indiana
