= Carr Township, Clark County, Indiana =

Carr Township
- Township
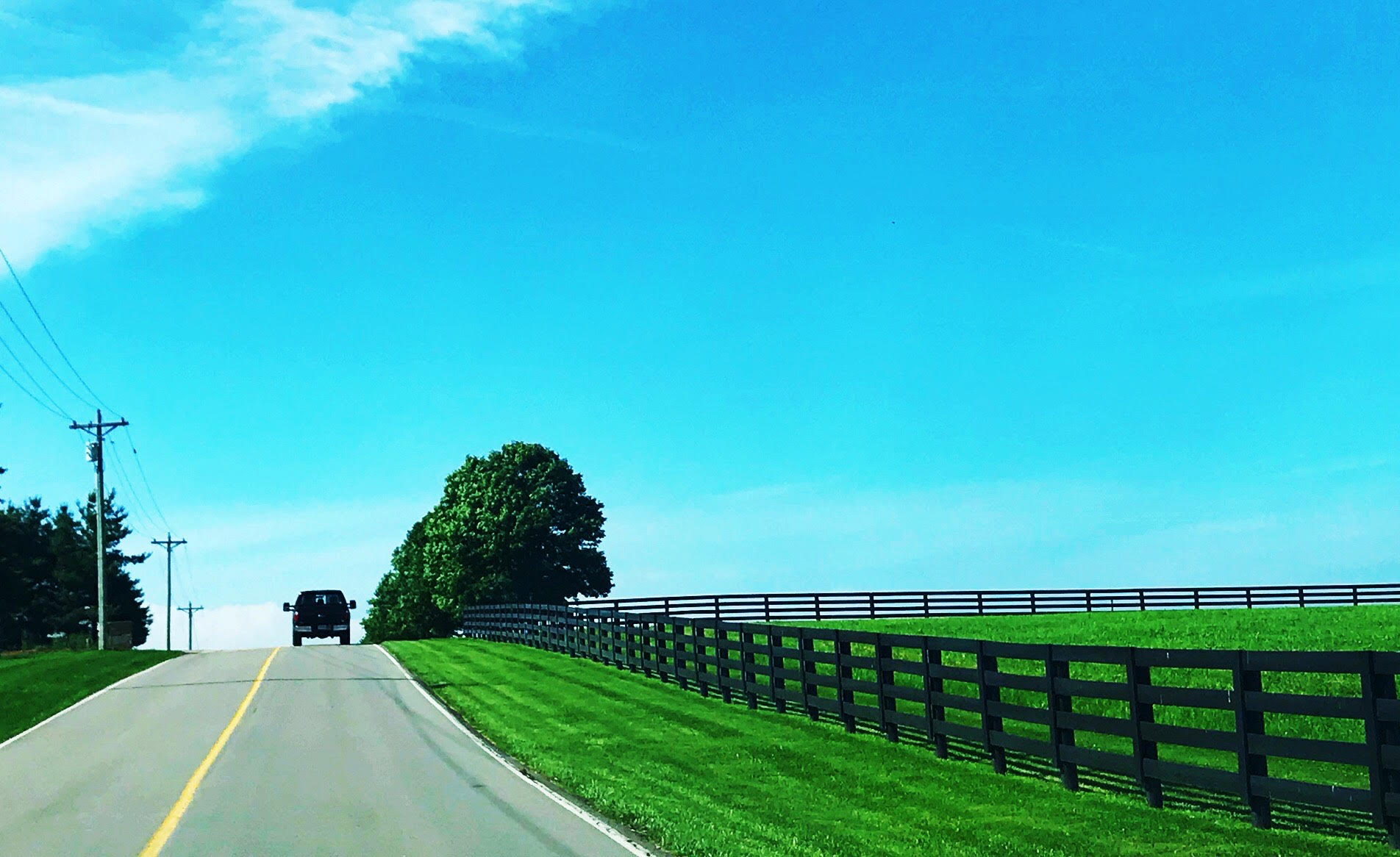
- Rural scene in Carr Township in August 2020

- Location of Carr Township in Clark County
- Coordinates: 38°26′46″N 85°50′11″W
- Country: United States
- State: Indiana
- County: Clark

Government
  - Type: Indiana township

Area
  - Total: 26.89 sq mi (69.6 km^{2})
  - Land: 26.36 sq mi (68.3 km^{2})
  - Water: 0.53 sq mi (1.4 km^{2})
- Elevation: 499 ft (152 m)

Population (2020)
  - Total: 4,830
  - Density: 179.6/sq mi (69.3/km^{2})
- FIPS code: 18-10432
- GNIS feature ID: 453158

Carr Township is one of twelve townships in Clark County, Indiana. As of the 2020 census, its population was 4,830 and it contained 1,794 housing units.

== History ==
Carr Township was organized in 1854. It was named for General John Carr, a pioneer settler.

== Geography ==
According to the 2020 census, the township has a total area of 26.89 square miles (69.6 km^{2}), of which 26.36 square miles (68.3 km^{2}) (or 98.03%) is land and 0.53 square miles (1.4 km^{2}) (or 1.97%) is water.

=== Unincorporated towns ===
- Bennettsville
- Broom Hill
- Carwood
- Wilson

=== Adjacent townships ===
- Monroe Township (northeast)
- Union Township (northeast)
- Silver Creek Township (southeast)
- New Albany Township, Floyd County (south)
- Lafayette Township, Floyd County (southwest)
- Wood Township (west)

=== Major highways ===
- Indiana State Road 60
- Indiana State Road 111

=== Cemeteries ===
The township contains Several cemeteries: Adkins, Allen (aka Jenkins), Hagest (aka Keibler and Hitch), Hickory Grove, Merrill-Ward, Miller, St. John the Baptist Catholic, Stone Grave at Deam Lake, and Wagner.
