= New Albany High School (Indiana) =

Public high school in New Albany, Indiana

Location
- 1020 Vincennes Street; New Albany, Indiana 47150; United States; 38°17′55.11″N 85°48′39.64″W

Information
- Type: Public
- Motto: Be Great
- Established: 1853; 173 years ago
- School district: New Albany-Floyd County Consolidated School Corporation
- Principal: Michelle Ginkins
- Teaching staff: 99.06 (on an FTE basis)
- Grades: 9–12
- Enrollment: 1,814 (2023–2024)
- Student to teacher ratio: 18.31
- Color
- Fight song: Carnival
- Athletics: Swimming, tennis, track, basketball, football, softball, baseball, cross country, soccer, golf, wrestling, dance team
- Athletics conference: Hoosier Hills Conference
- Team name: Bulldogs
- Website: nahs.nafcs.k12.in.us

New Albany High School is a public high school located in New Albany, Indiana, United States. Founded on October 3, 1853, as Scibner High School, it was renamed. New Albany High school is the oldest public high school in the state of Indiana. The school was closed from 1859 to 1864 to be made into a hospital for union soldiers during the American Civil War. The old Scribner High School became Scribner High School for Negroes after state law required schools for African Americans. After the local schools were integrated in the early 1950s it closed and was demolished in 1959.

The school was notable for the first FM high school radio station (88.1 MHz) to be licensed by the Federal Communications Commission (FCC), and has had its own Public-access television cable TV channel WNAS-TV since 1980. It is a part of the New Albany-Floyd County Consolidated School Corporation.

The school serves New Albany and surrounding unincorporated areas.

== History ==
Established as Scribner High School on October 3, 1853, after a motion was made on September 20, it was originally located on West Fourth and Spring Street. It was renamed to New Albany High School the same year under James Wood of Ayers University, who transferred the school to Josiah Bliss. One year after its opening, the school was temporarily closed on March 2, 1854, due to a ruling by the Indiana Supreme Court that its administration was allocating funds unlawfully. It was reopened until it was again closed in 1859, when the United States Army converted the school into a hospital for soldiers serving in the American Civil War.

Prior to the Conclusion of the American Civil War, Scribner High School reopened for academic usage; enrolling students in September 1864. In 1870, the high school established two separate high schools; with the original building being converted into an All Boys' High School, while a secondary building on Spring Street and Bank Street was designated as the Female High School. In 1880, the schools were consolidated; with all students beginning attendance solely at the former Female High School. In 1891 the first-ever school newspaper was started called the High School Herald.

In 1902, the site at Bank Street and Spring Street was torn down for the construction of the Carnegie Library Building. From 1902 to 1903, the High School temporarily held classes at the Frisbee House on East Sixth and Spring Street. It temporarily relocated once again at the end of academic sessions in 1903, where the school moved to the DePauw college building at East Main and Ninth Street. In 1905, relocation of the high school ceased with the completion of a new building on East Sixth and Spring Street.

In 1927, the current building located on Vincennes Street was constructed, after the land was bought by Anders Rasmussen for $10,000 and funds were secured from alumni and the city. Additions to the building in 1942 allowed for increased space for administrative usage; along with facilities to host the country's first high school radio program. Several additions continued, with a student theater being added in 1978, a new library, swimming pool and laboratories between the years of 1979 and 1982. In 1998, renovations began on the school, bringing additions such as its current athletic offices, clinic, bookstore, cafeteria, kitchen area, auditorium and auxiliary gym.

== Athletics ==
New Albany has won the following IHSAA state championships:

- Basketball
  - Boys – 1973, 2016
  - Girls – 1999
- Softball – 1987
- Tennis
  - Boys – 1967

== Media ==
WNAS, 88.1 FM, is a student-run non-commercial radio station.

== Notable alumni and faculty ==
=== Alumni ===
- James W. Dunbar – U.S. Representative
- Rob Conway – professional wrestler
- Josh Dallas – actor
- Joe Dean – college basketball player, university athletic director, sports broadcaster
- Billy Herman – Major League Baseball player
- Karen Kamensek – Grammy Award winning orchestral and opera conductor
- Romeo Langford – basketball player
- Alexis Lete – professional wrestler
- Max Macon – Major League Baseball player
- Sherman Minton – United States Senator and an associate Justice of the Supreme Court of the United States
- William Vaughn Moody – dramatist and poet
- Charles A. Prosser – educator and politician
- Josh Rogers – MLB pitcher
- Mike Sodrel – United States Representative
- Camille Wright – Olympic swimmer
- Fuzzy Zoeller – PGA golfer

=== Faculty ===
- Edwin Hubble – Astronomer, after whom the Hubble Space Telescope is named. He taught physics and Spanish and served as basketball coach at the school in the early 20th century

== See also ==
- List of high schools in Indiana
