= National Register of Historic Places listings in Floyd County, Indiana =

Location of Floyd County in Indiana

This is a list of the National Register of Historic Places listings in Floyd County, Indiana.

This is intended to be a complete list of the properties and districts on the National Register of Historic Places in Floyd County, Indiana, United States. Latitude and longitude coordinates are provided for many National Register properties and districts; these locations may be seen together in an online map.

There are 25 properties and districts listed on the National Register in the county. Another three properties were once listed but have been removed.

Properties and districts located in incorporated areas display the name of the municipality, while properties and districts in unincorporated areas display the name of their civil township. Properties and districts split between multiple jurisdictions display the names of all jurisdictions.

This National Park Service list is complete through NPS recent listings posted January 2, 2026.

== Current listings ==
	Name on the Register	Image	Date listed	Location	City or town	Description
1	Beard–Kerr Farm	Beard–Kerr Farm	December 19, 2012 (#12001057)	502 Georgetown-Lanesville Rd., southwest of Georgetown; 38°16′47″N 85°58′42″W	Georgetown Township	
2	Cedar Bough Place Historic District	Cedar Bough Place Historic District	March 19, 2008 (#08000188)	800 block of Cedar Bough Place; 38°17′39″N 85°48′51″W	New Albany	
3	Culbertson Mansion	Culbertson Mansion	June 28, 1974 (#74000019)	914 E. Main St. 38°17′11″N 85°48′46″W	New Albany	
4	DePauw Avenue Historic District	DePauw Avenue Historic District	March 19, 2008 (#08000189)	Roughly DePauw Ave. from Vincennes St. to Abersold Dr., the 1200 block of Beechwood Ave., and 1211 and 1214 Vance St. 38°18′06″N 85°48′39″W	New Albany	
5	Division Street School	Division Street School	July 15, 2002 (#02000193)	1803 Conservative St. 38°17′35″N 85°48′18″W	New Albany	
6	East Spring Street Historic District	East Spring Street Historic District	December 19, 2002 (#02001566)	Roughly bounded by E. 5th, E. Spring, E. 8th, and E. Market Sts.; also roughly bounded by alley north/northwest of Elm St., the west curb line of Vincennes St., alley south/southwest of Market St., and the east curb line of 5th St. 38°17′18″N 85°48′57″W	New Albany	Second set of addresses represent a boundary increase dated December 2, 2020.
7	Gabriel Farnsley House	Gabriel Farnsley House	September 23, 1982 (#82000037)	North of Bridgeport off State Road 111; 38°11′19″N 85°54′27″W	Franklin Township	
8	M. Fine and Sons Building	M. Fine and Sons Building	September 11, 2018 (#100002917)	1420 E. Main St. 38°17′18″N 85°48′29″W	New Albany	
9	Charles and Elletha Frederick House		August 24, 2022 (#100008053)	6954 US 150; 38°21′03″N 85°56′14″W	Floyds Knob vicinity	
10	Georgetown Historic District	Georgetown Historic District	January 9, 2013 (#12001148)	Roughly bounded by Georgetown-Greenville Rd., Canal Ln., Walnut St., and an unnamed alley 38°17′40″N 85°58′30″W	Georgetown	
11	Louis and Anna K. Kunz Hartman House		August 23, 2022 (#100008059)	911 State St. 38°17′32″N 85°49′39″W	New Albany	
12	Hedden's Grove Historic District	Hedden's Grove Historic District	December 27, 2010 (#10001076)	1600 blocks of Hedden Park and Hedden Court, and 2410-2418 Charlestown Rd. 38°18′32″N 85°48′24″W	New Albany	
13	Jersey Park Farm	Jersey Park Farm	March 1, 1984 (#84001027)	Off Cunningham Sarles and Borden Rds., northwest of Galena; 38°22′39″N 85°57′39″W	Greenville Township	
14	Mansion Row Historic District	Mansion Row Historic District	May 9, 1983 (#83000123)	Main St. between State and 15th Sts., and Market St. between 7th and 11th Sts. 38°17′12″N 85°48′48″W	New Albany	
15	New Albany Downtown Historic District	New Albany Downtown Historic District	September 3, 1999 (#99001074)	Roughly between W. 1st St. and E. 5th St., and W. Main St. to E. Spring St. 38°17′07″N 85°49′18″W	New Albany	
16	New Albany-Floyd County Public Library		August 23, 2022 (#100008054)	180 West Spring St. 38°17′06″N 85°49′33″W	New Albany	
17	New Albany National Cemetery	New Albany National Cemetery	June 25, 1999 (#99000735)	1943 Ekin Ave. 38°18′00″N 85°48′21″W	New Albany	
18	Northside Industrial Historic District		January 8, 2026 (#100012503)	Bounded by Culbertson Ave. on the north, Oak St. on the south, E. 4th Street on the east, and the west property line of 300 Culbertson Ave. on the west. 38°17′21″N 85°49′25″W	New Albany	
19	Old Pike Inn	Old Pike Inn	April 12, 2001 (#01000358)	941 State St. 38°17′35″N 85°49′43″W	New Albany	
20	Scribner House	Scribner House	November 9, 1977 (#77000015)	106 E. Main St. 38°17′00″N 85°49′21″W	New Albany	
21	Shelby Place Historic District	Shelby Place Historic District	March 19, 2008 (#08000190)	1500 and 1600 blocks of Shelby Place; 38°17′48″N 85°48′42″W	New Albany	
22	Simpson Memorial United Methodist Church	Simpson Memorial United Methodist Church	September 29, 2004 (#04001098)	9449 Harrison St. 38°22′23″N 85°59′29″W	Greenville	
23	U.S. Court House and Federal Office Building		March 22, 2021 (#100006338)	121 West Spring St. 38°17′07″N 85°49′29″W	New Albany	
24	Woodbine	Woodbine	September 8, 1994 (#94001107)	1800 Old Vincennes Rd. 38°17′35″N 85°51′09″W	New Albany	
25	William Young House	William Young House	December 27, 2010 (#10001075)	509 W. Market St. 38°16′55″N 85°49′46″W	New Albany	

== Former listings ==
	Name on the Register	Image	Date listed	Date removed	Location	City or town	Description
1	Yenowine-Nichols-Collins House	Yenowine-Nichols-Collins House	May 12, 1975 (#75000017)	March 6, 2008	5118 State Road 64	Georgetown	Burned down October 31, 2005
2	New Albany and Salem Railroad Station		January 12, 1984 (#84001031)	March 25, 1996	Pearl and Oak Sts. 38°17′18″N 85°49′26″W	New Albany	Demolished in December 1995.
3	Sweet Gum Stable		March 14, 1996 (#96000292)	December 15, 2011	627 W. Main St. 38°16′49″N 85°49′47″W	New Albany	Torn down May 22, 1999

== See also ==
- List of National Historic Landmarks in Indiana
- National Register of Historic Places listings in Indiana
- Listings in neighboring counties: Clark, Harrison, Jefferson (KY), Washington
- List of Indiana state historical markers in Floyd County
- List of attractions and events in the Louisville metropolitan area
