= List of Indiana state historical markers in Floyd County =

Location of Floyd County in Indiana

This is a list of the Indiana state historical markers in Floyd County.

This is intended to be a complete list of the official state historical markers placed in Floyd County, Indiana, United States by the Indiana Historical Bureau. The locations of the historical markers and their latitude and longitude coordinates are included below when available, along with their names, years of placement, and topics as recorded by the Historical Bureau. There are 23 historical markers located in Floyd County.

== Historical markers ==
Marker title	Image	Year placed	Location	Topics
Site of Camp Whitcomb		1966	Southeastern corner of the junction of Beharrell Avenue and E. Spring Street in New Albany; 38°17′57″N 85°47′40″W	Military
New Albany		1991	W. Spring Street at the southbound offramp from Interstate 64 in New Albany; 38°17′0″N 85°49′49″W	Historic District, Neighborhoods, and Towns, Early Settlement and Exploration
Michael C. Kerr Home		1992	1109 E. Main Street in New Albany; 38°17′14.4″N 85°48′41″W	Politics, Buildings and Architecture
New Albany		1992	Junction of E. Spring Street and Woodrow Avenue in New Albany; 38°17′55″N 85°47′44.7″W	Historic District, Neighborhoods, and Towns, Early Settlement and Exploration
Clark's Grant		1992	Indiana University Southeast, 4201 Grant Line Road/State Road 111, New Albany just north of Interstate 265; 38°20′45″N 85°49′0″W	Early Settlement and Exploration, Military
State Bank of Indiana		1996	203 E. Main Street in New Albany; 38°17′4″N 85°49′15″W	Buildings and Architecture, Government Institutions, Business, Industry, and Labor
Culbertson Mansion		1996	914 E. Main Street in New Albany; 38°17′11″N 85°48′47″W	Buildings and Architecture, Business, Industry, and Labor
Scribner High School		1998	Southwestern corner of the junction of 1st and Spring Streets at the City-County Building in New Albany; 38°17′6″N 85°49′31″W	Education, African American
Buffalo Trace Route		1999	2212 State Street in New Albany; 38°18′20.6″N 85°50′24.6″W	Nature and Natural Disasters, Transportation
Culbertson Widows' Home		2003	704 E. Main Street in New Albany; 38°17′9″N 85°48′54″W	Women, Buildings and Architecture
A Gateway to Freedom		2004	Southeastern corner of the junction of Main and Third Streets in New Albany; 38°17′4″N 85°49′11″W	Underground Railroad, African American
New Albany Downtown Historic District		2004	Northeastern corner of the junction of Pearl and Market Streets in New Albany; 38°17′6″N 85°49′21″W	Historic District, Neighborhoods, and Towns, Buildings and Architecture
Division Street School		2005	1803 Conservative Street in New Albany; 38°17′35″N 85°48′18″W	African American, Education, Buildings and Architecture
Fairview Cemetery		2005	Junction of Culbertson Avenue and E. Sixth Street in New Albany; 38°17′27″N 85°49′11″W	Cemetery, Politics
New Albany's Carnegie Library		2005	201 E. Spring Street in New Albany; 38°17′12″N 85°49′19″W	Carnegie Library, Buildings and Architecture
New Albany Tornado, 1917		2007	New Albany Children's Academy at 1111 Pearl Street in New Albany; 38°17′40″N 85°49′37″W	Nature and Natural Disasters
New Albany and Salem Railroad (The Monon)		2007	Junction of Bank Street and Culbertson Avenue in New Albany; 38°17′22.6″N 85°49′25″W	Transportation, Underground Railroad
Cardinal Joseph E. Ritter		2007	Southwestern corner of the junction of E. 13th and E. Oak Streets in New Albany; 38°17′32″N 85°48′46″W	Religion, Education
Lucy Higgs Nichols		2011	38 East 3rd Street, directly behind the 2nd Baptist Church, New Albany; 38°17′02″N 85°49′10″W	Women, African American, Military, Medicine
Mob Violence 1862		2012	142 W. Main St., New Albany; 48°16′58″N 85°49′29″W	
John B Ford		2019	First Harrison Bank, 9849 US 150, Greenville; 38°22′28″N 85°59′33″W	Business, Industry, and Labor
Sherman Minton		2021	Georgetown Elementary School, 8800 High St., Georgetown; 38°17′43″N 85°58′13″W	Politics
Indiana University Southeast		2021	Indiana University Southeast, Sciences Greenhouses, 4201 Grant Line Rd., New Albany; 38°20′34″N 85°49′05″W	Education & Library

== See also ==
- List of Indiana state historical markers
- National Register of Historic Places listings in Floyd County, Indiana
