= New Albany Downtown Historic District =

New Albany Downtown Historic District may refer to:

- New Albany Downtown Historic District (Indiana), listed on the NRHP in Indiana
- New Albany Downtown Historic District (Mississippi), listed on the NRHP in Mississippi
