= Lucy Higgs Nichols =

American nurse (1838–1915)

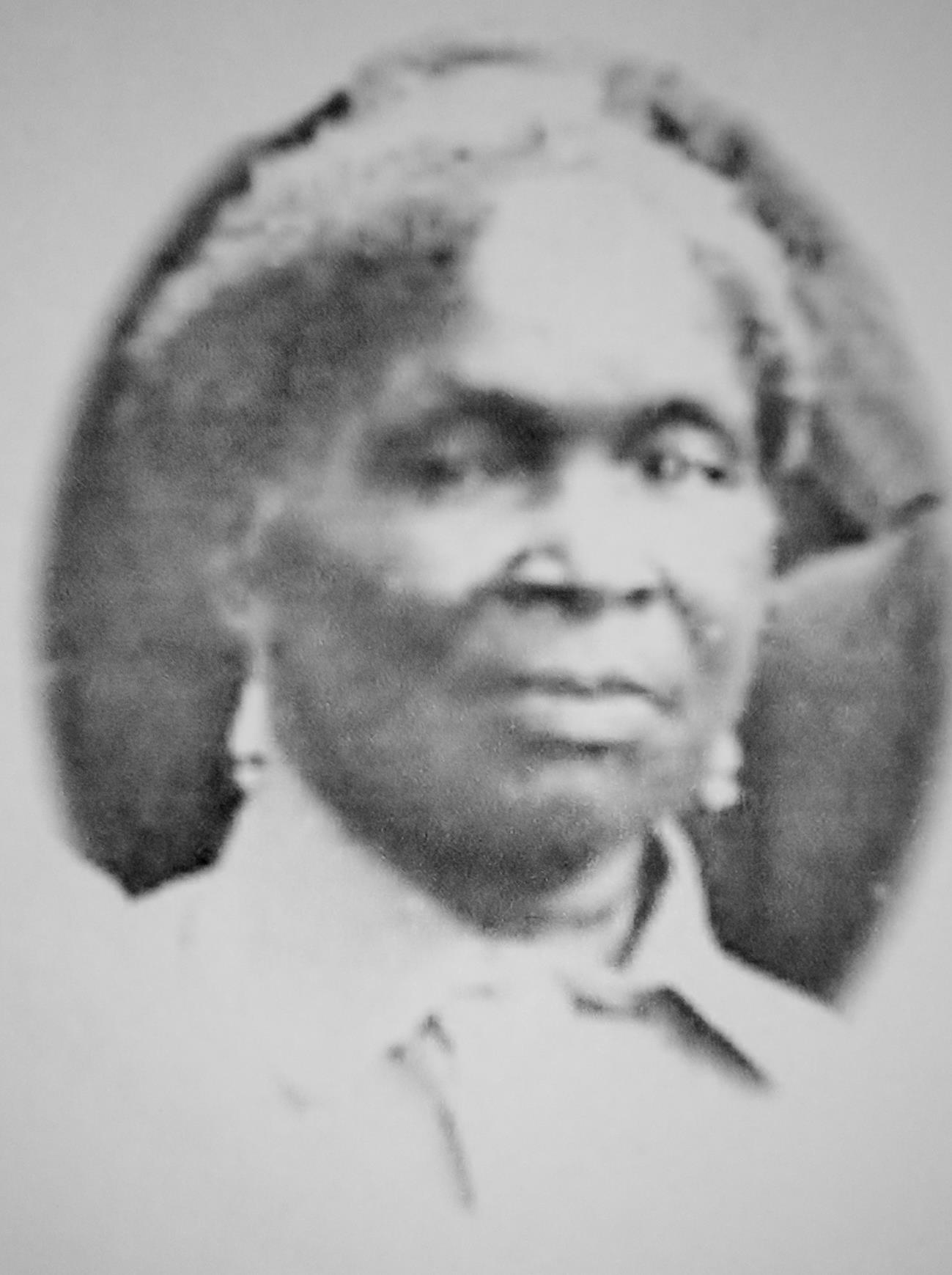
- Lucy Higgs Nichols (detail), in Indianapolis, 1898, with the G.A.R., where she celebrated her recent government pension approval. Stuart B. Wrege History Room, New Albany Floyd - County Public Library
- Born: April 10, 1838
- Died: January 25, 1915; Grays Creek, Tennessee
- Burial place: West Haven Cemetery, New Albany, Indiana
- Occupation: Nurse
- Years active: American Civil War
- Medical career
- Institutions: United States Army

Lucy Higgs Nichols (April 10, 1838 – January 25, 1915) was an African American woman who escaped slavery. She served as a nurse for the Union Army during the American Civil War. Known affectionately as "Aunt Lucy", her sole photo shows her surrounded by veterans of the 23rd Indiana Volunteer Infantry Regiment, of the Army of the Tennessee. She was as devoted to the soldiers as they were to her and her daughter, Mona. She lost her daughter and husband during the Civil War, and after the war ended, settled in New Albany, Indiana, where she worked as a housekeeper to several officers and eventually married her second husband, John Nichols. She lived in New Albany with her husband for more than forty years, until her death on January 25, 1915, at the Floyd County Poor House.

The Grand Army of the Republic admitted her as their only honorary, female member, not only of Sanderson's Post, men's group, but of the United States. "Aunt Lucy" was treated as family, and loved by all the soldiers that knew her. Due to their sustained efforts, she was granted her government pension for diligent nursing and other services with them, in 28 battles, from June 1862 through the end of the war. She marched in victory with the troops in Washington, D.C., on May 23, and May 24, 1865, for the Grand Review of the Armies. Although her accomplishments were buried in archives for more than 100 years, in 1898, newspaper articles, about the special act of congress that granted her pension, spread her fame across the country. These newspapers included The Janesville Gazette, The Salem Democrat, Atlanta Constitution, The Logansport Journal, The Denver Post, The Freeman, and The New York Times.

== Early life ==
Until recently, little was known about Lucy Higgs as a child, but local historians from New Albany, Indiana—Pamela R. Peters, Curtis H. Peters, Victor C. Megenity, and others—discovered documents regarding her being owned as a slave in Hardeman County, Tennessee. Pamela Peters wrote an article about their findings, which appeared, for Black History Month, in the Indiana Historical Society's Traces of Indiana and Midwestern History magazine (Winter 2010).

Rueben Higgs' heirs were allotted a portion of slaves and land in July 1855. An additional, earlier family record lists Lucy's birth as April 10, 1838, after which she was sent south with other slave property to Mississippi and allotted to Wineford Amanda Higgs, the only child of Rueben and his first wife Elizabeth, who both died in 1845, according to the Higgs family cemetery archives from Hardeman County. The families went to court again, when Wineford died, and the slave children were sent back up to Grays Creek, Tennessee, to be allotted equally between his heirs. On Tuesday, January 8, 1861, court documents again list Lucy with four other slaves, and their value, to be divided between Willie and Prudence Higgs, after their second-eldest son, Marcus Higgs, died.

== Escape from slavery and the Civil War ==
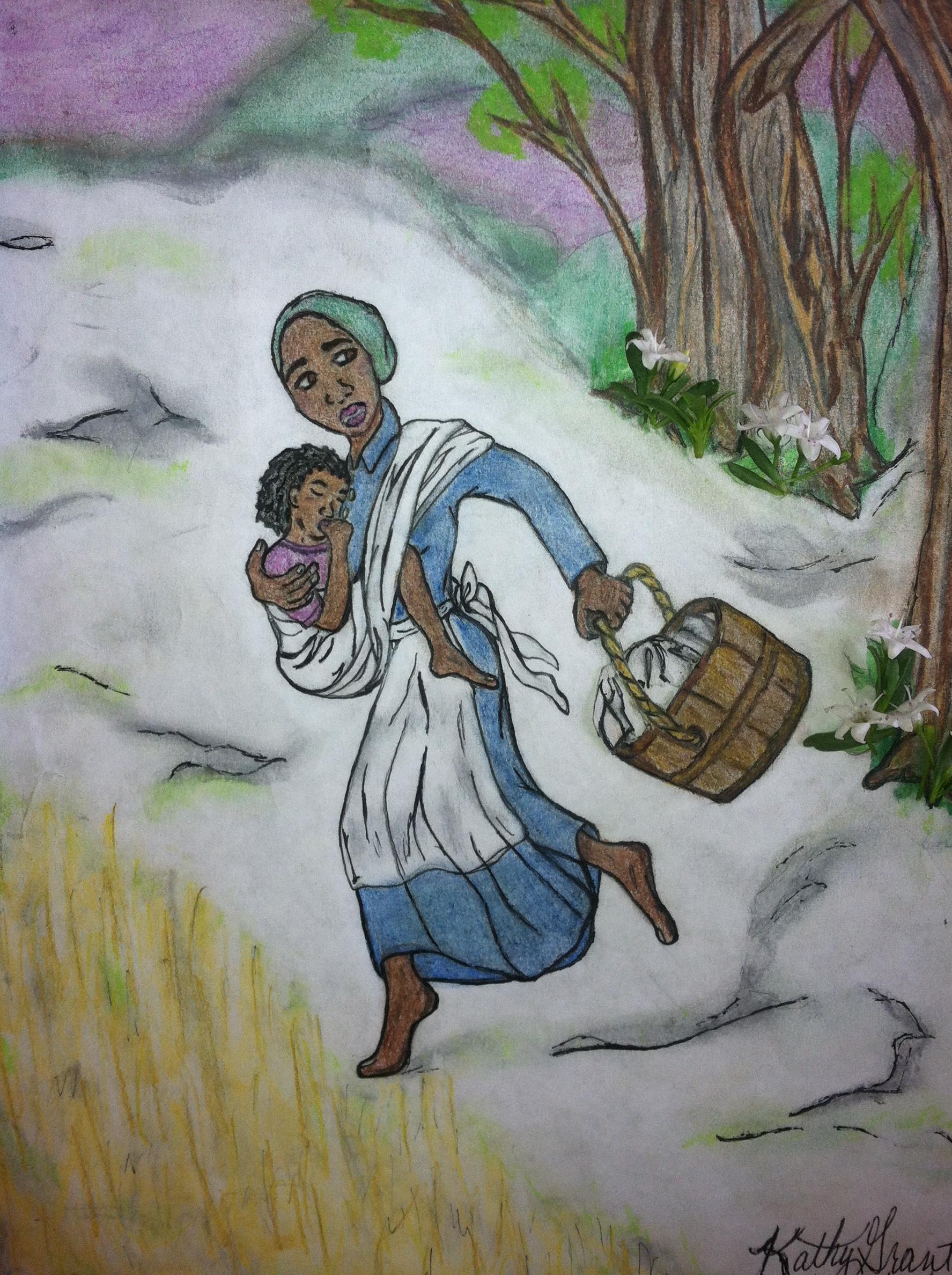
Lucy Higgs with her daughter Mona escaping slavery from Grays Creek, Tennessee to the Union lines, June 1862.

In late June 1862, Lucy, her daughter Mona, and some other slaves escaped from Grays Creek, Tennessee, crossed the Hatchie River, and eventually arrived at the Union lines that were at the fairgrounds near Bolivar, Tennessee, almost thirty miles away. Major Shadrack Hooper of the 23rd Indiana Infantry Regiment, who recorded all of their battles as adjutant, reported her joining their regiment, and described her character as someone having integrity, honesty, intelligence, always smiling, cheerful and kind, a willing washerwoman, seamstress, nurse, cook, and singer, as well as a "rattling good forager". Other soldiers, and the regiment surgeon, Magnus Brucker, described her as a faithful nurse.

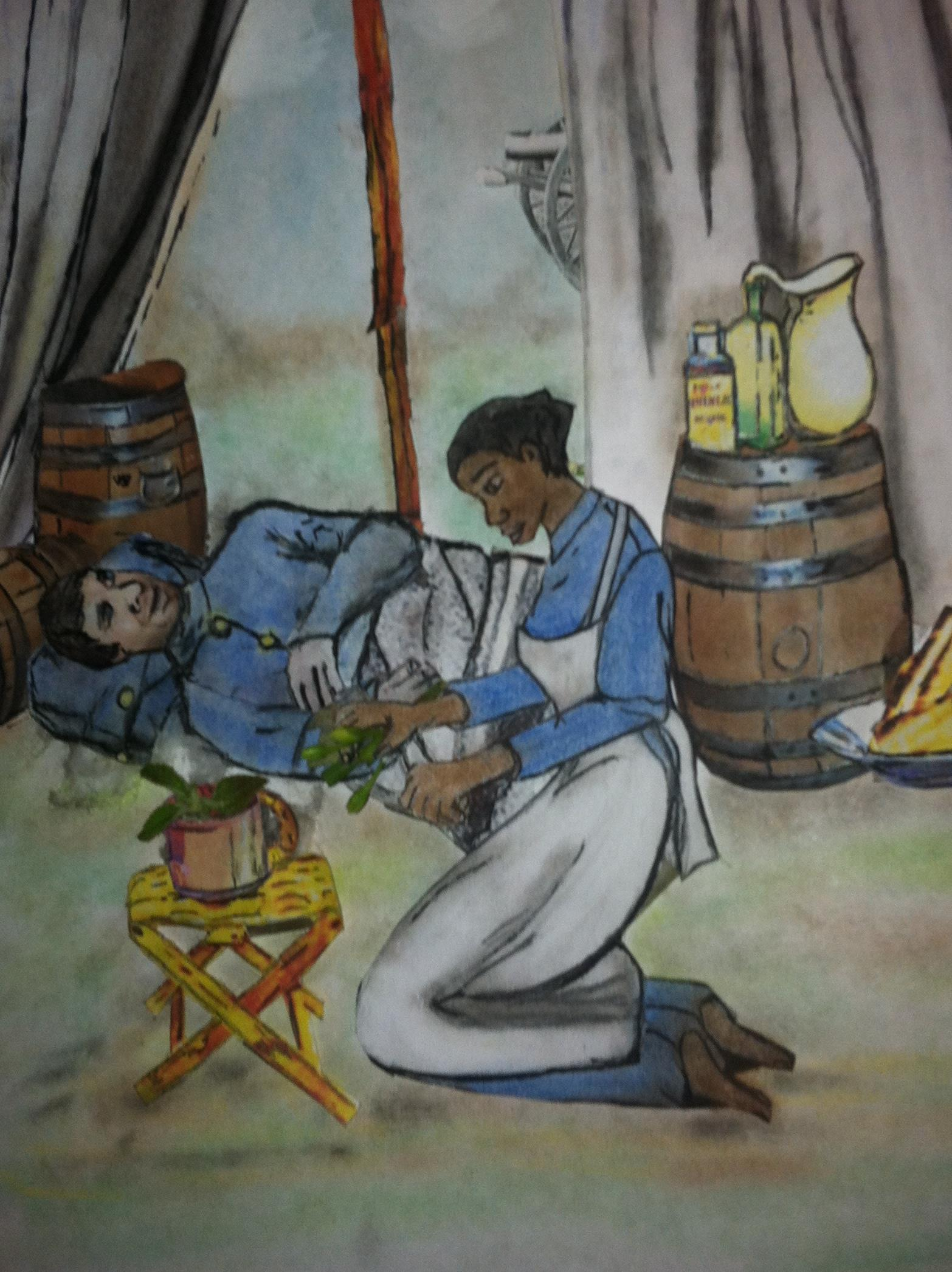
Lucy Higgs Nichols foraged herbs and gave medicine to soldiers from Indiana's 23rd Infantry during the Civil War, 1862–1865.

Lucy's first husband came into the Union lines as a laborer under General Grant, or may have possibly served in a colored regiment that was formed; but it is not known what happened to him. Mona, Lucy's young daughter, died at the Siege of Vicksburg. Although the details of her death are not known, the Indiana 23rd Infantry offered her a funeral with flowers. In the middle of the war, when the regiment went on furlough to New Albany, Indiana, Lucy went with them and was employed as a servant by several officers, including General W. Q. Gresham. When the Indiana 23rd Infantry were re-deployed to the war in Mississippi, she returned to her nursing duties in service of the Union and was present at every siege. Lucy followed the army east under General Sherman, in The March to the Sea, and then north, where the 23rd Infantry was present in the Grand Review of the Armies.

== After the war: work with the soldiers of the 23rd Infantry ==
After the Emancipation Proclamation, Lucy was a free citizen of the New Albany, Indiana, community and maintained herself with modest means. She still worked for officers, and nursed veterans back to health. So beloved was Lucy that five years after the war, when she contracted measles, she was cared for by the soldiers, until she was well; and, again, years later, when she had a stroke. When General Gresham's daughter was married, Lucy was an invited guest at Palmer House, in Chicago, and was considered a member of the family.

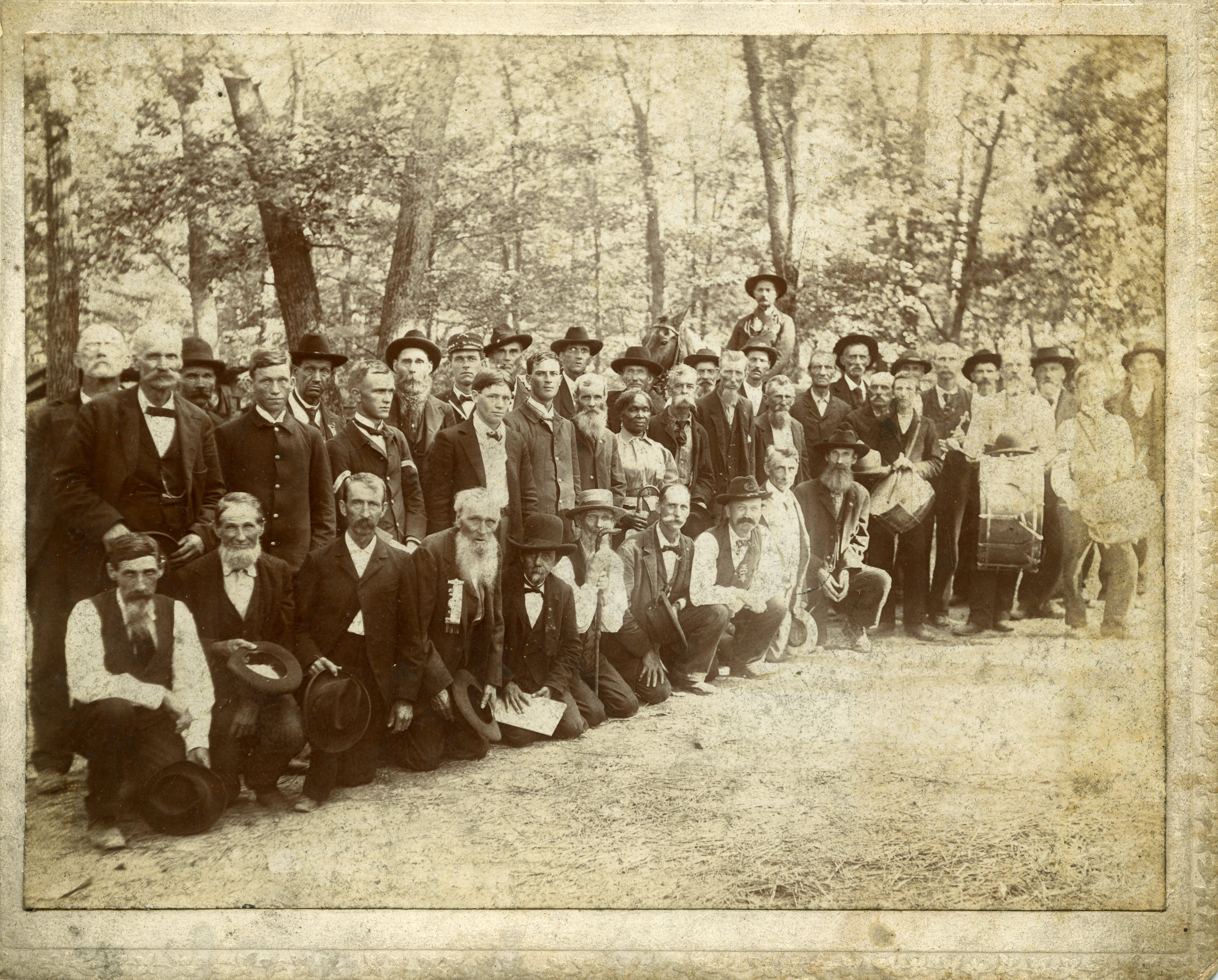
Group of Civil War and Spanish–American War soldiers and veterans at a reunion in English, Indiana in 1898. Several are identified: front row, 4th from left is Lemuel Ford; front row, 10th from left (dark hat and beard): Winfield Scott Sloan; 2nd row from front, 1st on left: Peter Gottfried; 2nd row 6th from left (long white beard): Henry McCowan; 2nd row, 7th from left (African-American woman): Lucy Nichols; 2nd row, man with largest drum: Tim Ingle. Stuart B. Wrege History Room, New Albany - Floyd County Public Library

As the Grand Army of the Republic was forming posts all over the nation, Lucy was made an honorary member of Sanderson's Post. She attended every meeting and reunion with the soldiers. At the last meeting of more than seventy veterans the officers escorted her with much respect. Many volunteer nurses during the war were denied pensions, and Lucy was no exception; but the GAR rallied to her defense again. She was eventually granted $12 a month in a special act reported by The Committee on Pensions on July 1, 1898, which subsequently made her famous, through the many newspaper stories on the granting of the pension.

== Personal life and later years ==
On the University of Kentucky Libraries' Notable Kentucky African Americans Database (NKAA), John Nichols, Lucy's second husband, is described as residing in Tennessee and Indiana with his mother and father as free community members, according to the 1850 census of Washington County, Tennessee. Indiana's 152nd Infantry listed John as a musician, but after the war, he joined the colored regiment before returning to New Albany after three years. Floyd County, Indiana's index to marriage records, from 1845 to 1920, shows that Lucy and John married on April 13, 1870. They did not have any children together. The 1910 census still shows them living quietly on Naghel Street, New Albany. Lucy Nichols is listed on the ledger of the Floyd County Poor House as being admitted on January 1, 1915. Even though her birthplace is listed on the register as Kentucky, she is listed clearly on Rueben Higgs' court and family inventories as having been born in Halifax County, North Carolina, before moving to Grays Creek, Tennessee. The register shows her death as January 25, 1915. She is buried in an unmarked grave at West Haven Cemetery, New Albany.

== Legacy ==
- In 2011, a marker in her honor was erected by the Indiana Historical Bureau and the Friends of Division Street School. As listed on Indiana Historical Bureau markers, Lucy Higgs Nichols' marker is located at 38°17.283′N 85°48.763′W, on E. Market St., in New Albany, Indiana. A summary of her life and accomplishments appears on the front and back of the marker.
- The Carnegie Center for Art & History in New Albany, Indiana, houses an exhibit, Remembered: the Life of Lucy Higgs Nichols, Men & Women of the Underground Railroad.
- The Frazier History Museum in Louisville, Kentucky, reprises the life of Lucy Higgs Nichols each year, through programs and a local theatrical interpretation.
- An historical novel based on the life of Lucy Higgs Nichols, Honorable (Purpose in Repose) and a companion book for younger readers, by Indiana author Kathryn Grant, were published in 2013.

== Further sources ==
- Newspapers
  - "Daughter of the Regiment," Janesville Daily Gazette, 03/14/1889, p. 1
  - "Negro Woman Given Membership in G.A.R.", Atlanta Constitution, 01/31/1891.
  - "Gray Heads and Gray Beards in Reunion", New Albany Daily Ledger, 09/21/1894. "Colored Nurse's Pension", Logansport Journal, 07/15/1898, p. 5
  - "Noted Woman Warrior Receives Her Reward", New York Times, 12/14/1898.
  - "Why Aunt Lucy Got a Pension", The Denver Sunday Post, 12/18/1898.
  - "Negress Who Nursed Soldiers Is a Member of the G. A. R.", The Freeman, 09/03/1904.
  - "Only Woman Ever Member of G.A.R. Dies in Asylum", New Albany Daily Ledger, 01/29/1915.
  - Lucy Nichols in "Obituary Notes", New York Times, 01/31/1915.
  - Lucy Nichols article, New Albany Weekly Ledger, 02/03/1915.
  - Shiels, Damain, "Who Shot General McPherson", Civil War Gazette, 02/01/2001.
  - Bean, Amanda, "The Civil War: 23rd Indiana Regiment", News and Tribune, 03/13/2013.
  - Hooper, Shadrach K., "A Historical Sketch of the 23rd Indiana Volunteer Infantry July 29, 1861, to July 23, 1865", Report of the Indiana-Vicksburg Military Park Commission, 1910, Prepared in Pamphlet Form by the Author for Private Distribution to the Survivors of the 23rd Indiana Regiment at Their Annual Reunion, New Albany, Indiana, 09/29-30/1910.
  - Peters, Pamela R., Peters, Curtis H., and Meginity, Victor C., "Lucy Higgs Nichols: From Slave to Civil War Nurse of the 23rd Indiana Regiment", Traces (Winter 2010): 35–39.
- Documents and records
  - The National Archives, US Colored Troops Military Service Records, film 3M589
  - The Civil War Archive – Indiana Units
  - Floyd County, Indiana, Index to Marriage Record 1845–1920
  - Inclusive Volume W. P. A. Book Number Indicates Location of Record, Book 6, p. 572.
  - Caron's Directory of the City of New Albany 1888–1889
  - Halifax County Deed Books, Bk. 22, p. 225, No. 24
  - United States Federal Census Records, 1830, 1840, 1850, 1860, 1870, 1880, 1890
  - Hardeman County, Tennessee Records, Inventory of Rueben Higgs' Slave Property, 03/02/ 1846
  - Hardeman County, Tennessee Records, Inventory of Rueben Higgs' Slave Property, 07/09/ 1855
  - Hardeman County, Tennessee Records, Index to Marriage Record January 1866
  - Floyd County, Indiana, General Affidavit for claim No. 1130541, 29/07/1993
  - Floyd County, Indiana, Pension Office, Deposition #6, Case of Lucy Nichols, No. 1130541, 04/12/1894
  - 55th Congress, 2nd Session, H. R. Report No. 4741 {to accompany H.R. 1366}, 06/23/1898
