= Carnegie Center for Art & History =

- U.S. Historic district – Contributing property
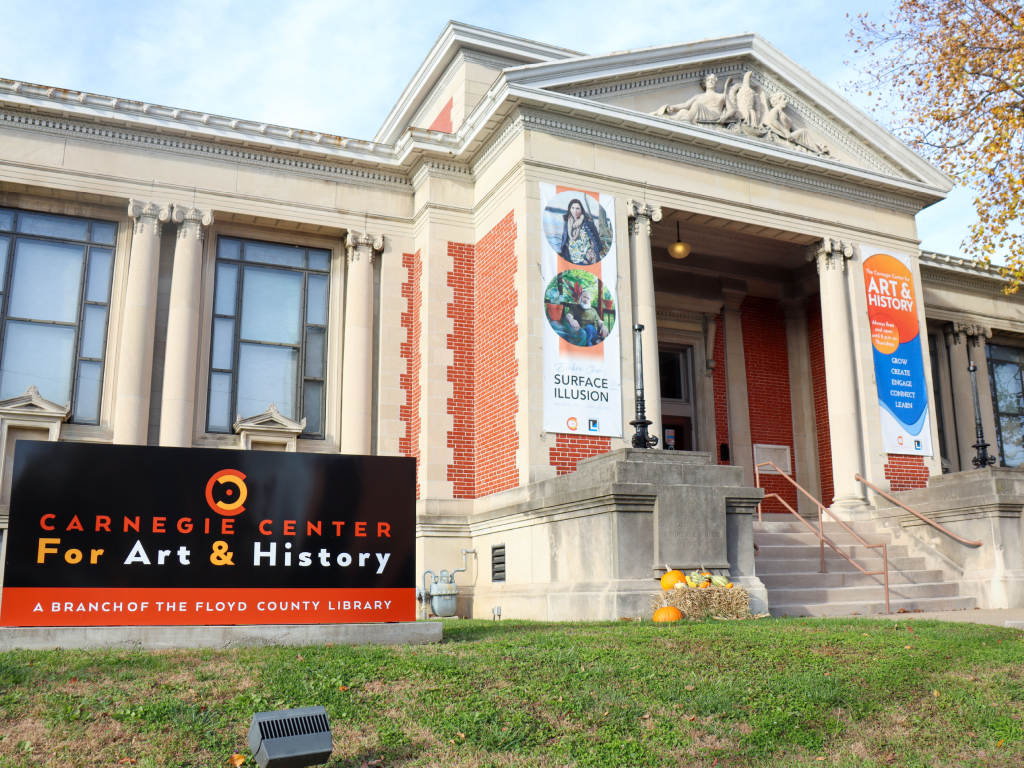
- Front of the Carnegie Center

- Location within Indiana Location within the United States
- Location: New Albany, Indiana
- Coordinates: 38.2867°N 85.8219°W
- Built: 1902
- Architect: Clarke & Loomis
- Architectural style: Neoclassical Revival
- Website: www.fcculturalartscenter.org
- Part of: New Albany Downtown Historic District (ID99001074)
- Added to NRHP: September 3, 1999

The Carnegie Center for Art & History, within the Downtown Historic District of New Albany, Indiana, is a contemporary art gallery and local history museum. The Carnegie Center offers a variety of exhibitions, events, and learning opportunities for the public. The Carnegie Center is a branch of the New Albany-Floyd County Public Library.

The building was initially built as a Carnegie library, first opened on March 2, 1904, with 11,125 total books. It is of Beaux-Arts architecture style. It was used as a library until 1969, when the new New Albany-Floyd County Public Library was built. After a $1.2 million renovation in 1998, the name was changed to the Carnegie Center for Art & History to better reflect its mission and library heritage. In 2015, total attendance was 26,690 and Carnegie Center staff presented 107 programs to participants of all ages. All exhibits and programs are offered free of charge to the public.

== Exhibitions ==
The Carnegie Center has two permanent exhibitions.

The first is entitled Ordinary People, Extraordinary Courage: Men and Women of the Underground Railroad, which opened in March 2006. The exhibit explores the lives of real people both free and enslaved, whose selfless acts of courage helped fugitive slaves find hope and freedom. The Exhibit is based on the book, The Underground Railroad in Floyd County, Indiana by Pamela Peters. Information for the project was gathered from court records, newspaper stories, oral history accounts, and other artifacts. At the heart of the exhibit are the residents of New Albany who were able to accomplish so much in light of the risk of being involved with the Underground Railroad.

The second permanent exhibit is entitled Remembered: The Life of Lucy Higgs Nichols. The exhibit guides visitors through Lucy's life from 1838 to 1915. Period documents and letters detail her life as an enslaved person in Tennessee, a nurse during the Civil War, and her post-war life in freedom. It highlights her six-year battle for a nurse's pension, ultimately awarded through a Special Act of Congress. Visitors can explore maps that pinpoint the paths she took and examine actual artifacts from the Civil War, including an Enfield rifle and an amputation saw of the same type used by the surgeons Lucy served with in the 23rd Indiana Volunteers.

== See also ==
- List of museums in Indiana
- List of attractions and events in the Louisville metropolitan area
- National Register of Historic Places listings in Floyd County, Indiana
