= Bernard Hock =

American table tennis bat maker

- Born: Bernard Francis Hock; August 12, 1912; Wills Township, LaPorte County, Indiana
- Died: 18 September 1999 (aged 87); New Albany, Indiana
- Occupations: Inventor, entrepreneur, US Table Tennis champion

Bernard Francis Hock (August 12, 1912 – August 18, 1999) was a table tennis "bat maker", considered a world-class pioneer in the design and fabrication of table tennis rackets (known as "bats" in Britain, and "paddles" in the U.S. and Canada). Many of the great American players of the classic "Table Tennis Era" exclusively used Hock rackets. Hock is remembered as a true craftsman. In 1977, Sports Illustrated described Hock as the "Stradivarius of bats".

Hock's United States Olympic & Paralympic Committee biography mentions him as "'old buzzard' Hock, a number-one-class character, a champion, a fine man, and a person who has done more for table tennis than most anyone."

Hock originally played tennis, but became a competitive, champion US table tennis player.

== Biography ==
Bernard Hock was born August 12, 1912, in Wills Township, LaPorte County, Indiana, the fifth of Mary Agnes (née Nawroski) and Frank William Hock's seven children. Hock was a graduate of New Albany High School and a long-time resident at 808 Cedar Bough Place in New Albany's Cedar Bough Place Historic District, one of the earliest private streets in the United States.

== Pioneer table tennis racket maker ==
Hock began crafting table tennis paddles in 1933 for his personal use. Hock made his first paddle using wood from a discarded packing crate and a bicycle inner tube for the rubber. Jerry Hock, the youngest of the five Hock brothers, and a long-time table tennis player, said "in the beginning the boys made their own table, and Bernie was very early into making rackets. He stretched inner-tube rubber over the wood (paddles) to produce a surprisingly good playable racket." Hock quickly started experimenting with better materials. Friends and opponents ordered Hock's new designs, and Hock was soon receiving orders from players around the world.

As his reputation grew, Hock sold hundreds of paddles monthly, later thousands annually. It is estimated Hock sold 75,000 paddles in his lifetime. By 1953, Hock paddles were highly regarded throughout the world. During one US championship, 10 of 12 winners used Hock paddles.

=== Hock's unique paddle design and manufacturing processes ===
Bernard Hock designed, manufactured and sold highly customized table tennis rackets made according to the customer's wishes. A player could choose among Hock's 200 designs, selecting the thicknesses of plywood paddles and the type of rubber, pip configuration, spacing and sizes on the rubber face. Hock would adhere the rubber facing, or the player could affix the facing. One Hock innovation was reducing the weight in the paddle grip. Hock was able to produce a hardbat paddle with a total weight (including rubber) of less than four ounces. Hock claimed that only straight handles offered players the best control.

Hock created paddles with extreme precision. In 1956 Hock said he used "a balance scale he made himself" and pre-weighed "every single racket", including the "rubber facings, plywood forms, mahogany handles, leather grips, everything." Hock also claimed he used "a special secret in the glue mixture".

=== Paddle material ===
In 1949, Hock sought special plywood in order to create better rackets. Living in New Albany, Indiana, Hock had easy access to that city's many veneer plywood factories in business at that time. While the cost of the plywood he specified was relatively high, it made a better bat with "less than 1% loss to warpage". Hock insisted the plywood factory follow his specifications exactly, "redrying the 3 veneers, face, back, and center core, to a specific moisture, a special glue," and then heating it all together "under certain pressure and heat". Hock also specified "that the face and back veneers be from the same tree or log and from consecutive slices off the log".

Hock said he imported special birch veneer and hand-mixed three different kinds of glue, including a special glue for the center core which gave his paddles "life and resilience". A Hock paddle is said to have a very distinctive "ping" sound when played. So durable were Hock's materials and glues he recommended soaking a dirty paddle in water.

=== Facing material ===
Hock faced his rackets with Leyland rubber from then Great Britain. Often referred to as "Hock" rubber, the material was later approved by the USATT Hardbat Advisory Committee.

=== Hock paddle styles ===
Hock offered two primary styles of paddles, a five-ply plywood model made of equal layers of basswood and the "Model No. 74", a lighter, thinner three-ply model that was slower and provided a player more flexibility. It earned a reputation for "chopping" during play.

Hock charged a flat $3.50 (equivalent to $42 in 2025) for each paddle and offered over 200 different variations in design and fabrication, ranging in weight between 3 3/4 oz. to 5 1/2 oz.

=== Hock blade players ===
In the late 1940s, Dick Miles and Marty Reisman were world class players who played using Hock rackets. Miles won four consecutive U.S. titles within a total of 10 national championships between 1945 and 1962, more than any other US player. At the age of 34, Miles, playing with a Hock racket (Style No. 74), reached the semifinals in the singles event of the 1959 World Championships, losing to the eventual world champion Rong Guo-Tuan. No one playing with a hard rubber racket has since gone farther in a World Championship. Reisman was the 1958 and 1960 U.S. Men's singles champion and the 1997 U.S. hardbat champion.

Other champions who played Hock paddles include:
• Leah Thall-Neuberger
• Sally Green Prouty, who used one favorite Hock paddle continuously for 15 years.
• Douglas Cartland

=== Champion Hock racket styles ===
• The Dick Miles style
Miles specified a custom Hock Number 74, 3-ply birch/basswood blade with Leyland rubber. Miles told Hock he did not want his racket handles glued to the handle piece of his blades. Miles said he wanted to "feel the vibration of ball contact through his hand". The racket handles Hock made for Miles had two small distinctive brads (nails) holding them in place without the additional hide glue Hock normally used.

• The Marty Reisman style
Reisman used a Hock Number 74 3-ply for control and later switched to a faster 5-ply Hock paddle. "The Hock," says Marty, "was the bat in use at Lawrence’s famous New York City Club". At the age of 67, Reisman won the 1997 US National Singles Hardbat Championship playing with his "beloved classic Hock paddle".

In 1977, a Sports Illustrated magazine featured Reisman's Hock paddle. The article said "By contrast, Reisman's Hock Special, covered only by a thin slice of pimpled rubber, looks like a bread-line handout. Yet in the eyes of the maestro, it is the 'Stradivarius of bats,' a five-ply master-work that is handmade by an Indiana artisan named Bernard Hock. Though at a distinct disadvantage, Reisman has steadfastly refused to switch to sponge because, he says, "I feel I'd be prostituting a talent that I devoted a lifetime to learning. The sponge offends my dignity." Reisman continued, saying "To play with the hard rubber racket is to be in communion with the ball, unlike the sponge, it lets you experience each stroke, each vibration, until the tone and feel of the racket become part of your neurological system. And it makes such a lovely sound — plickety-plock, plickety-plock. In the old days you went looking for tournaments with your ears. All you had to do was stop for a moment and listen—plickety-plock, plickety-plock."

== Hock rackets still approved for US tournament play ==
During the early 1980s, the factory that had hand-made the plywood to Hock's specifications had closed, but Hock still accepted and filled custom paddle orders. He had ordered enough special plywood in the 1950s to produce 75 times the number he had made.

By the mid-80's, the International Table Tennis Federation required tournament players’ rackets to display an ITTF logo. Umpires were required to check and disqualified any paddle without the logo. Having been produced up to 40 years earlier, Hock rackets didn't have the required logo. According to USA Table Tennis Association rules, Hock paddles are still allowed to be used in tournament play because "Hock (had) paid the USTTA approval fee when it became mandatory". Since Hock's rackets still meet USTTA specifications, "and it isn’t possible to prove that the rubber on it is original or not," players may play with one in any US tournament other than an internationally attended one like the U.S. Open.

== Later career ==
Hock suffered several heart attacks in his later life. Paying a price for having smoked cigarettes as a teenager, Hock said "...my illnesses plague me day after day. It’s a trial for me to do anything. I can work in my shop about a half an hour to an hour, then I have to rest. Sometimes I go 4 or 5 days without working in my shop. I go to the (local) table tennis club twice a week to hold things together. Once in a while I will play a game of doubles".

=== Table tennis coach ===
Hock coached the Southern Indiana Table Tennis Association at the Bernard Hock Table Tennis Center in New Albany until his death in 1999.

== Death and burial ==
Hock died of pneumonia September 18, 1999, in Clarksville, Indiana. His body was buried in St. Mary's (Catholic) Cemetery in New Albany, Indiana.

== Awards ==
• 1950 National Seniors Doubles Champion (with Jack Carrington)
• 1954 National Seniors Doubles Champion (with Eugene Bricker)
• 6 times Indiana Table Tennis Senior Champion

== Honors ==
USA Table Tennis Hall of Fame Inductee (1984)
