= 23rd Indiana Infantry Regiment =

23rd Regiment Indiana Volunteer Infantry
- Flag of the United States, 1863-1865
- Active: July 29, 1861, to July 23, 1865
- Country: United States
- Allegiance: Union
- Branch: Infantry
- Engagements: Battle of Shiloh; Battle of Port Gibson; Battle of Raymond; Battle of Champion Hill; Siege of Vicksburg; Battle of Kennesaw Mountain; Siege of Atlanta; Battle of Jonesboro; Sherman's March to the Sea; Battle of Bentonville

The 23rd Indiana Volunteer Infantry Regiment was an infantry regiment that served in the Union Army during the American Civil War.

== Service ==
- The 23rd Indiana Volunteer Infantry was organized at New Albany, Indiana, on July 29, 1861.
- Battle of Shiloh
- Battle of Port Gibson
- Battle of Raymond
- Battle of Champion Hill
- Siege of Vicksburg
- Battle of Kennesaw Mountain
- Siege of Atlanta
- Battle of Jonesboro
- Sherman's March to the Sea
- Battle of Bentonville
- The regiment mustered out of service on July 23, 1865.

== Total strength and casualties ==
The regiment suffered 4 officers and 68 enlisted men killed in action or died of wounds and 2 officers and 143 enlisted men who died of disease, for a total of 217 fatalities.

== Commanders ==
- Colonel William L. Sanderson

== Notable members ==
- Second Lieutenant Henry C. Foster, Company B, nicknamed "Coonskin" by comrades in the XVII Corps. Foster is best known for constructing a crude marksman's tower out of salvaged railroad ties upon the Union siege works during the Siege of Vicksburg, opposite the 3rd Louisiana Redan. Wearing his signature coonskin cap, Foster was acclaimed by his Union comrades as being the best shot in the Army of the Tennessee and consequently, Foster was permitted by Union commanders to sharpshoot on his own accord during the duration of the siege.
- Lucy Higgs Nichols, affectionately nicknamed "Aunt Lucy" by the men of the 23rd, was an escaped slave who, along with her daughter Mona, informally joined the regiment at Bolivar, Tennessee, in June 1862. Nichols was soon working in the unit as a forager, seamstress, washerwoman, cook, and nurse. She and her daughter quickly became a part of the unit, as the men and Nichols shared a familial devotion to one another. This bond is best exemplified by the actions of the regiment in the days following Mona's death during the siege of Vicksburg, when the regiment conducted a funeral, complete with arranged flowers, in the midst of the ongoing siege. Aunt Lucy would remain alongside the rest of the 23rd for the remainder of the war and was even present for the Grand Review of the Armies in 1865. She returned with the unit to New Albany, Indiana after the war, was the first and only African-American woman to be awarded an honorary membership in a unit's Grand Army of the Republic post, and was invited to and attended every reunion of the XVII Corps. She gained and fame and recognition later in life in 1898, when with the help of her comrades in the 23rd, Lucy was awarded a veteran pension.

== See also ==
- List of Indiana Civil War regiments
- Indiana in the Civil War
