= Sweet Gum Stable =

- Formerly listed on the U.S. National Register of Historic Places
- Location within Indiana Location within the United States
- Location: 627 W. Main St., New Albany, Indiana
- Coordinates: 38°16′49″N 85°49′47″W
- Area: less than one acre
- Built: 1836
- Architectural style: Transverse-frame barn
- NRHP reference No.: 96000292

Significant dates
- Added to NRHP: March 14, 1996
- Removed from NRHP: December 15, 2011

The Sweet Gum Stable, also known as Farmer's Feed and Supply, was located at the southeast corner of Main and W. Seventh Street in New Albany, Indiana. The property was a stop of the Underground Railroad, ten blocks west of another stop, the Town Clock Church, and a block away from the River Jordan for fugitive slaves, the Ohio River. The stable was built in 1877, and consisted of a balloon frame stable with an attached small brick and frame dwelling constructed about 1836. A feed store was added to the building in 1886. The structured measured 60 feet by 120 feet and encompassed the entire lot.

The house on the property was built by steamboat captain Thomas Riddle. After the American Civil War, Riddle's heirs sold most of the property to William Robison and James Payton. From them Frank Howard bought the property, and built the Sweet Gum Stable on the grounds of the original livery stable.

In early 1996 the stable was listed on the National Register of Historic Places. In late 1998 it was sold at auction, and on May 22, 1999, was torn down. The stable was removed from the National Register in December 2011.
