= William Young House (New Albany, Indiana) =

Historic house in Indiana, United States

- U.S. National Register of Historic Places
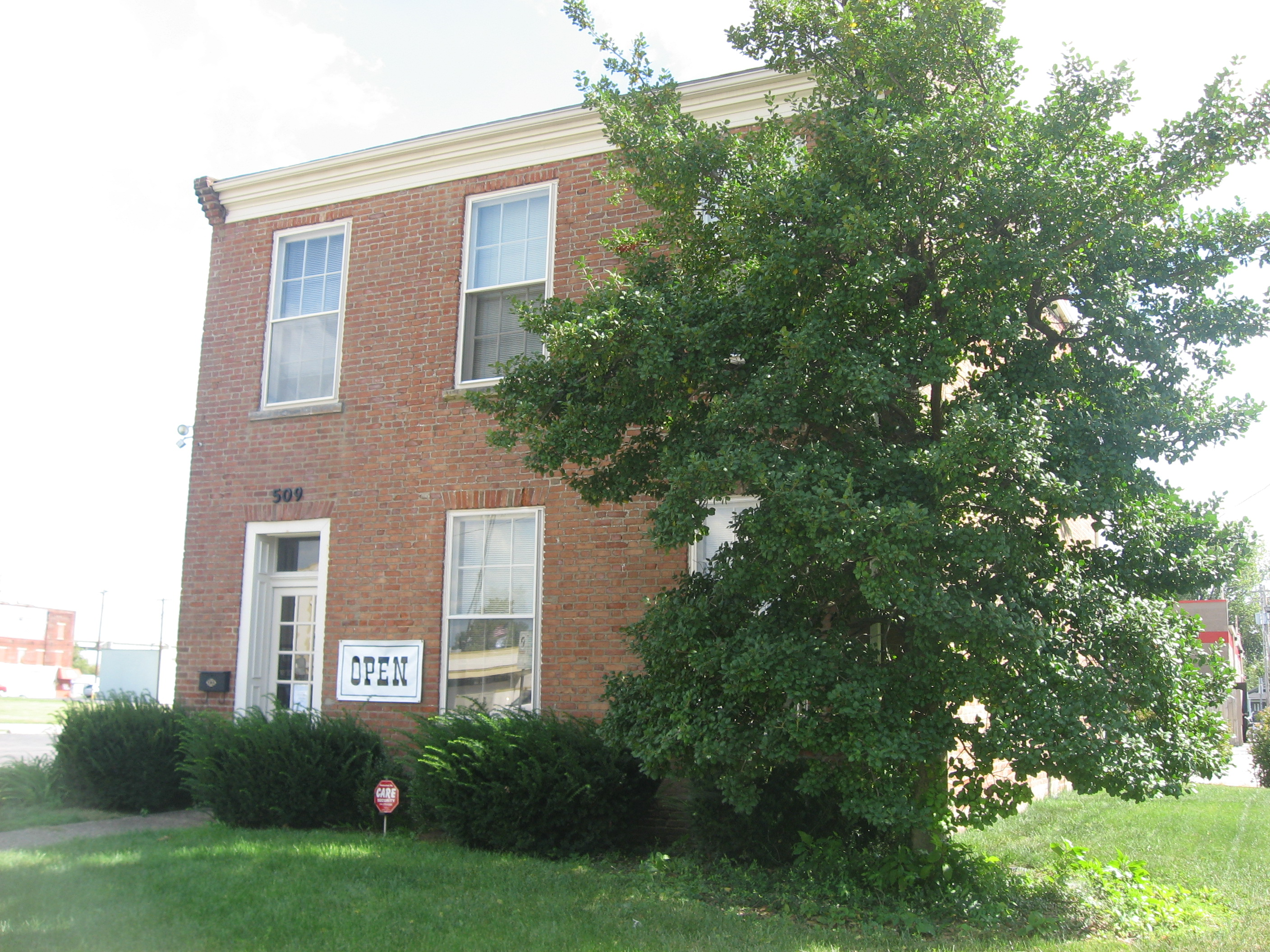
- William Young House, September 2012

- Location within Indiana Location within the United States
- Location: 509 W. Market St. New Albany, Indiana
- Coordinates: 38°16′55″N 85°49′46″W
- Area: 15 acres (6.1 ha)
- Built: 1837
- Architectural style: Federal
- NRHP reference No.: 10001075
- Added to NRHP: December 27, 2010

The William Young House is a historic home located at New Albany, Indiana. It was built about 1837, and is a two-story, three-bay, Federal style brick I-house. It features a two-story porch alongside the rear ell. Much of the interior remains intact. The house is open as a museum.

It was listed on the National Register of Historic Places in 2010.

== See also ==
- National Register of Historic Places listings in Floyd County, Indiana
