= Shelby Place Historic District =

Historic district in Indiana, United States

- U.S. National Register of Historic Places
- U.S. Historic district
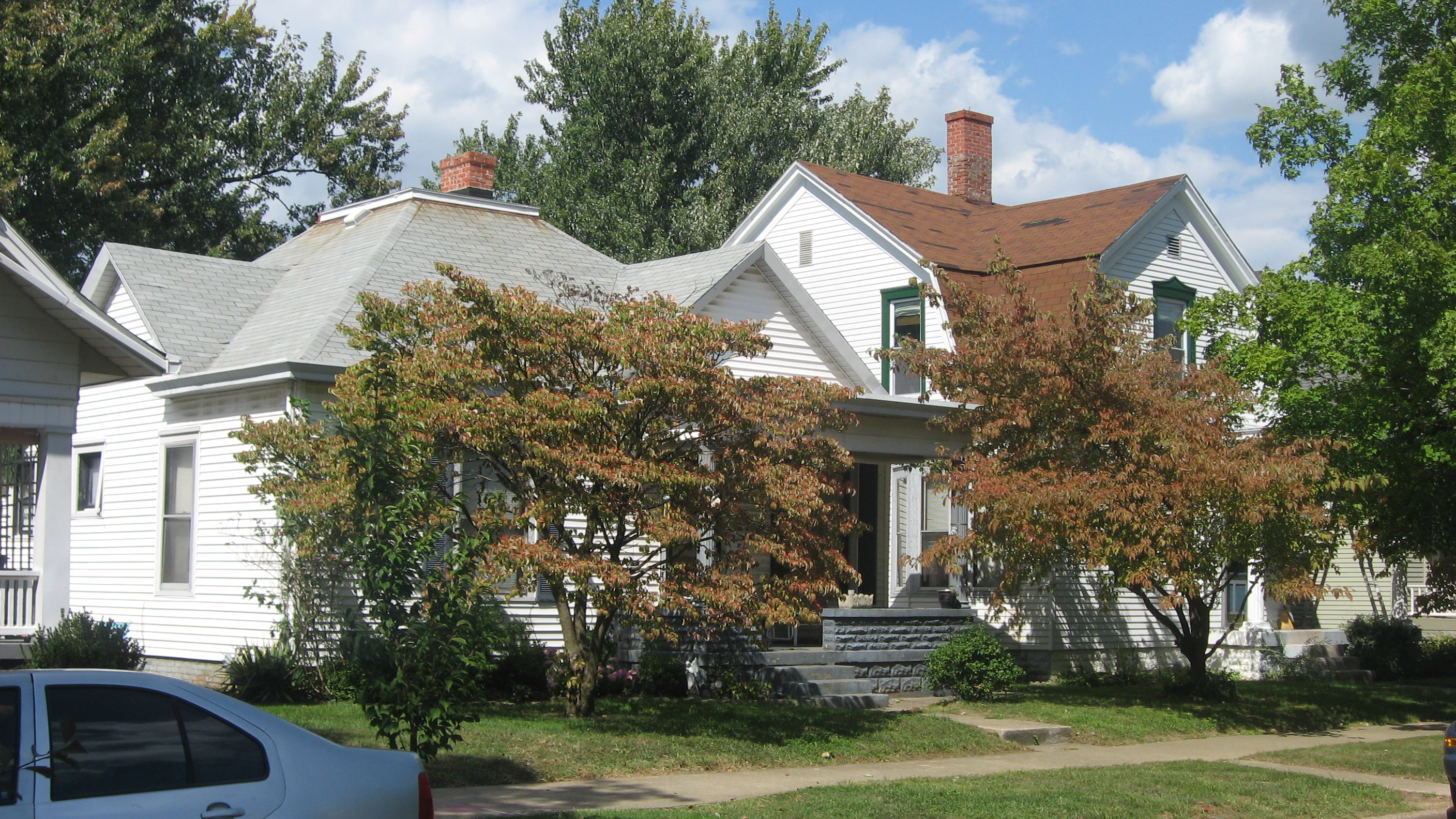
- Houses on the northern side of the street

- Location within Indiana Location within the United States
- Location: 1500 & 1600 blocks of Shelby Pl., New Albany, Indiana
- Coordinates: 38°17′48″N 85°48′42″W
- Area: 4.3 acres (1.7 ha)
- Built by: Stephen Day & Sons
- Architectural style: Queen Anne, Colonial Revival
- NRHP reference No.: 08000190
- Added to NRHP: March 19, 2008

Shelby Place Historic District is a registered historic district in New Albany, Indiana, one mile north of the Ohio River, across from Louisville, Kentucky. It consists of the 1500 and 1600 blocks of the road Shelby Place. It was placed on the National Register of Historic Places due to its historic architectural designs. Immediately to the east Vincennes Street separates the district from New Albany High School.

The primary architectural style of the district is Bungalow, although there are examples of Queen Anne, Dutch Colonial Revival, American Foursquare, and one Prairie-type. In total, 38 buildings and one site contributed to the historic nature of the district; fourteen buildings and one structure within the district do not contribute. The contributing buildings were built between 1907 and 1925, with the majority built within a five-year period of 1911–1916, 75% of which built in 1912 and 1913. Shelby Place started in 1906 as New Albany recovered from an economic depression, thanks to woodworking industries. To this day the district retains historic architectural integrity. Unlike nearby areas, Shelby Place has a wider street with central median.

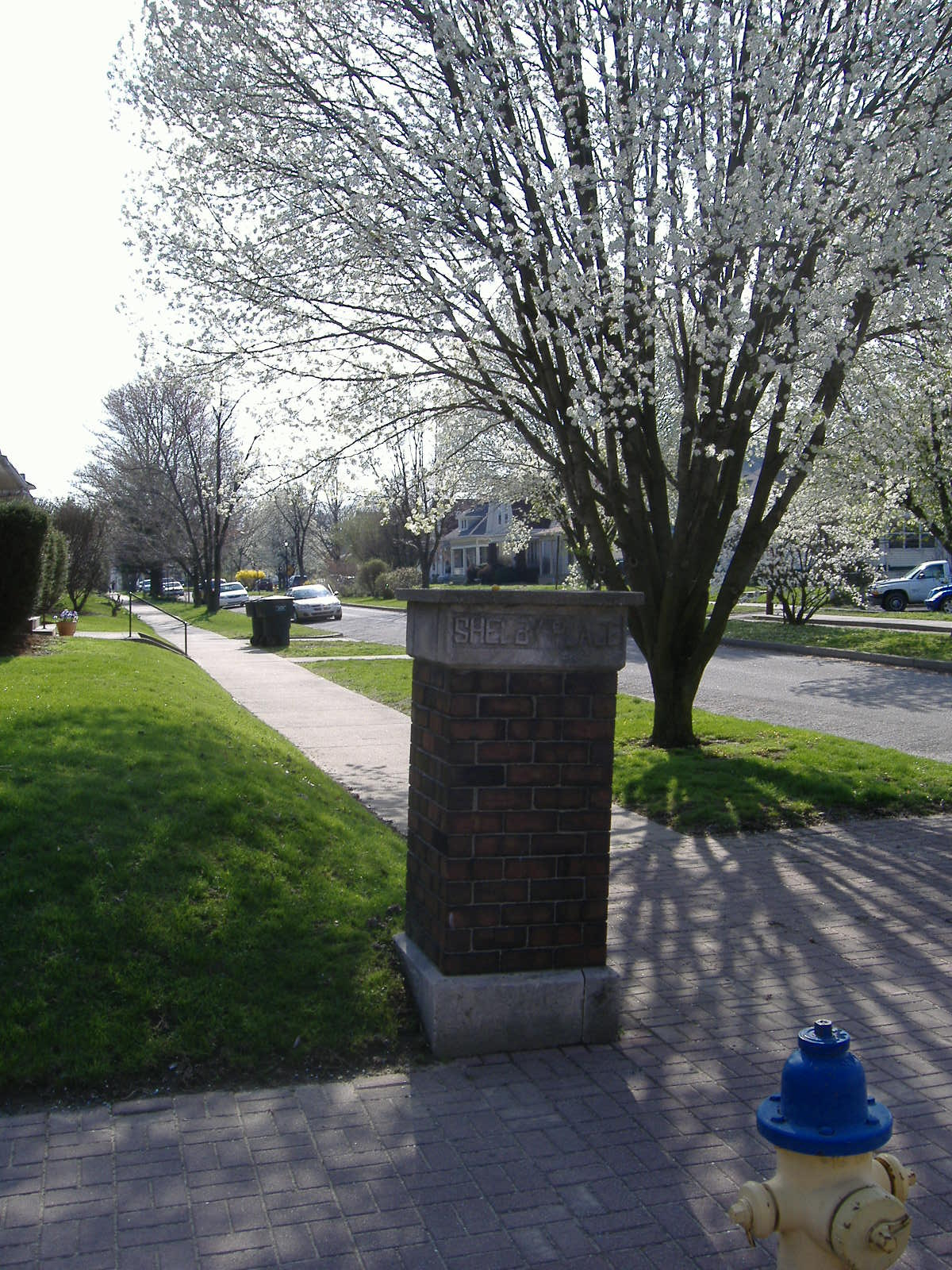
Shelby Place Brick Marker

The sole non-building contributing feature of the district is the eastern entrance to Shelby Place, which consists of two five-feet tall square brick columns on concrete bases which are original to the district. Both have concrete caps which say "Shelby Place" on them. Two similar columns once occupied the western entrance of the district, but nothing remains of the northwestern column, and the southwestern has only remnants.

On March 23, 1917, a tornado that severely damaged New Albany barely missed the district, causing minimal damage and no loss of buildings. The Ohio River flood of 1937 caused some flooding in Shelby Place, but the south side was on higher ground, and thus did not suffer as badly as other parts of New Albany.

In 1994 an architectural study determined that Shelby Place could eventually achieve National Register status. In 2006 the Indiana Department of Natural Resources gave a grant of $6,150 to the city of New Albany to prepare Shelby Place, Cedar Bough Place Historic District, and the DePauw Avenue Historic District for registration on the National Register of Historic Places. (Depauw has a similar architecture style as Shelby Place's, but are mostly larger domiciles than Shelby Place's, and has more architectural diversity.) All three neighborhoods were placed on the National Register on March 19, 2008.
