= Hedden's Grove Historic District =

Historic district in Indiana, United States

- U.S. National Register of Historic Places
- U.S. Historic district
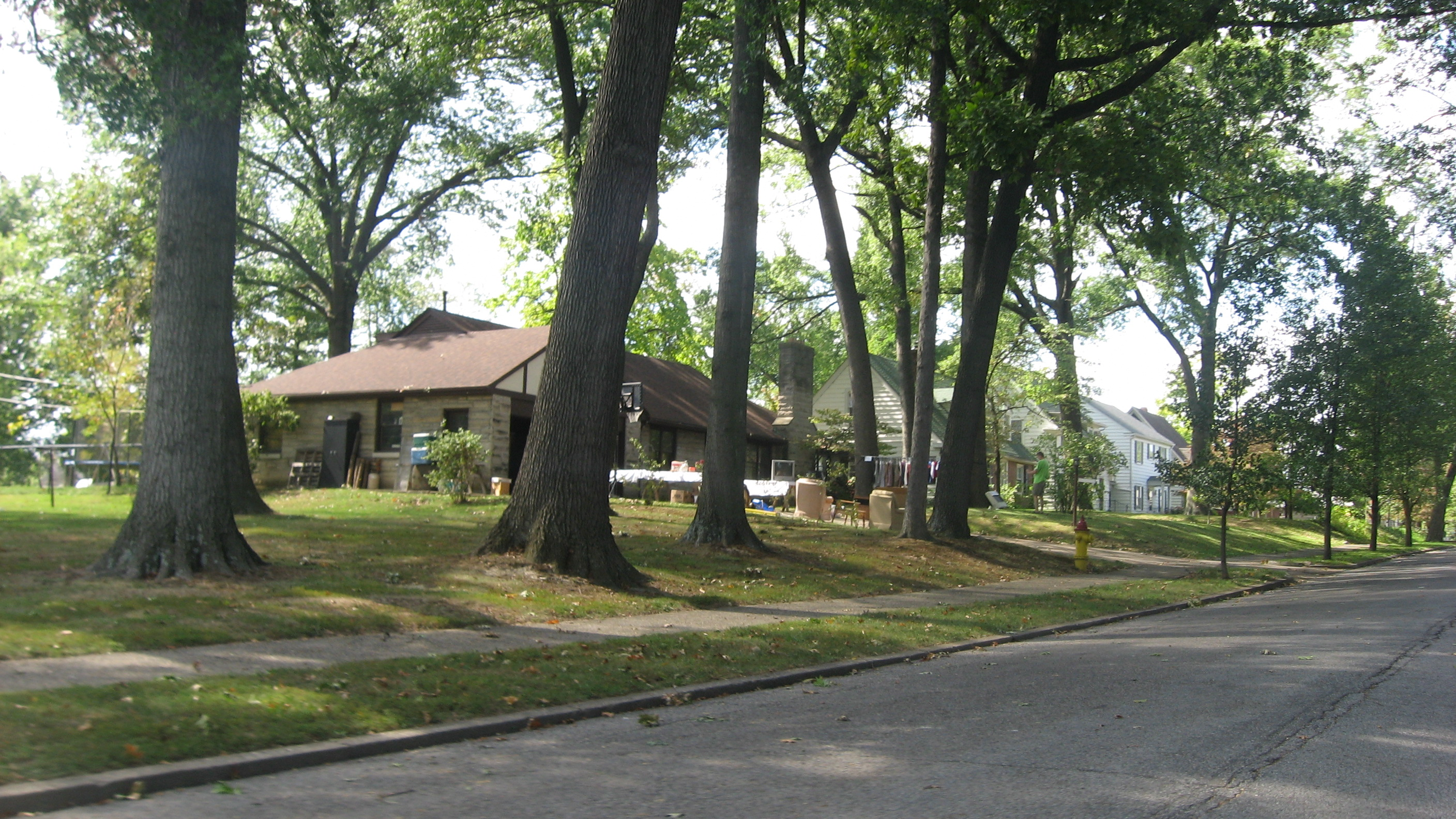
- Hedden's Grove Historic District, September 2012

- Location within Indiana Location within the United States
- Location: 1600 blocks of Hedden Park and Hedden Court, and 2410-2418 Charlestown Rd., New Albany, Indiana
- Coordinates: 38°18′32″N 85°48′24″W
- Area: 15 acres (6.1 ha)
- Built: 1925
- Architectural style: Colonial Revival, Tudor Revival, Bungalow/craftsman, Ranch
- NRHP reference No.: 10001076
- Added to NRHP: December 27, 2010

The Hedden's Grove Historic District is a national historic district located at New Albany, Indiana. The district encompasses 43 contributing buildings and 2 contributing structures in a suburban residential section of New Albany. It developed between the 1920s and 1950s, and includes notable examples of Colonial Revival, Tudor Revival, Bungalow / American Craftsman, and Ranch style residential architecture.

It was listed on the National Register of Historic Places in 2010.
