= Town Clock Church =

Historic church in Indiana, United States

Coordinates: 38.284310°N 85.819548°W

- U.S. Historic district – Contributing property
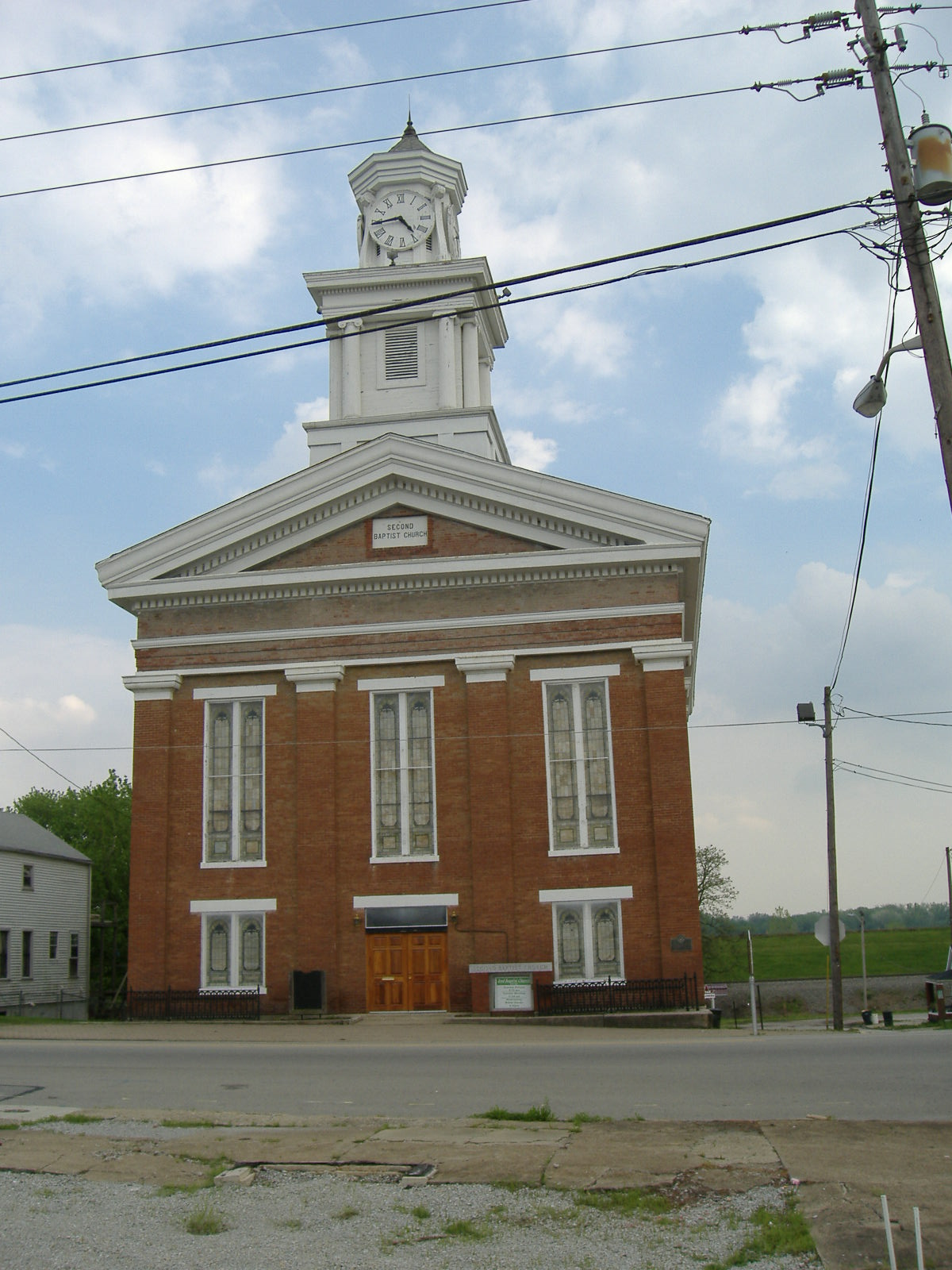
- Town Clock Church

- Location within Indiana Location within the United States
- Location: 300 E Main St; New Albany, Indiana
- Built: 1937
- Architect: Pugh, Hugh; I.P.Smith.
- Architectural style: Italianate, Federal
- Part of: New Albany Downtown Historic District (New Albany, Indiana) (ID99001074)
- Added to NRHP: September 3, 1999

The Town Clock Church, now the Second Baptist Church of New Albany, Indiana, United States, is a historic church located at 300 East Main Street, within the New Albany Downtown Historic District. It was constructed in 1852 as Second Presbyterian Church, in what was then the largest city in Indiana. It is near the Ohio River, across the border from Louisville, Kentucky.

It was a station on the Underground Railroad.

The church is brick, and is constructed in the Greek Revival style of architecture. It previously had a 160-foot high clock tower that could be seen by boat crews on the Ohio River. However, the tower has been shortened. The first phase of reconstruction is underway which will include a new steeple and clock faces. When reconstruction is complete, the tower will once again be 160 feet tall.
