= Scribner House (New Albany, Indiana) =

Historic house in Indiana, United States

- U.S. National Register of Historic Places
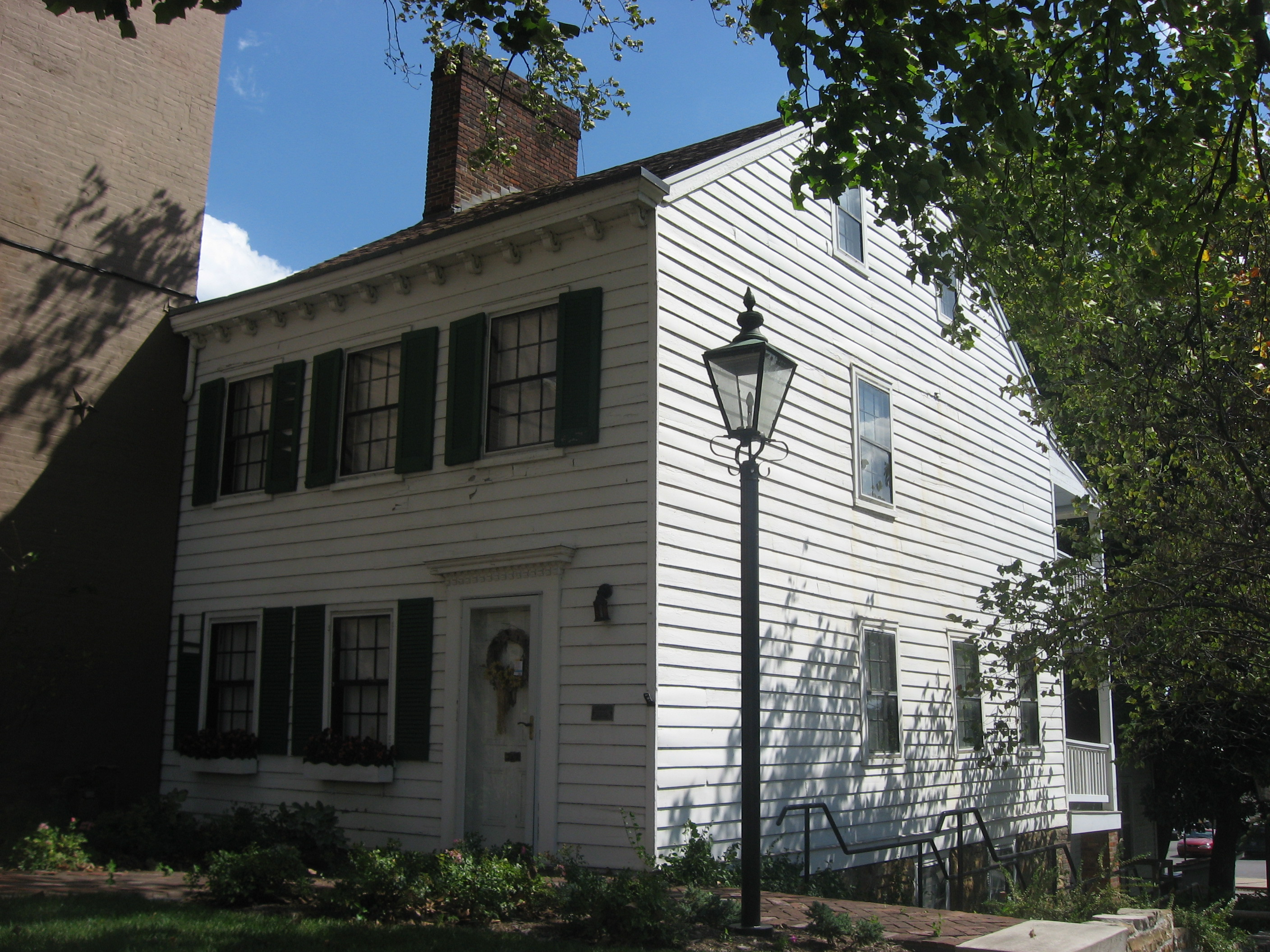

- Location within Indiana Location within the United States
- Location: 106 E. Main St., New Albany, Indiana
- Coordinates: 38°17′0″N 85°49′22″W
- Area: less than one acre
- Built: 1813-1814
- Built by: Scribner, Joel
- Architectural style: Federal
- NRHP reference No.: 77000015
- Added to NRHP: November 9, 1977

The Scribner House is a historic home located at New Albany, Indiana. It was built by Joel Scribner, one of the three brothers who founded New Albany. He and his brothers, Nathaniel and Abner, came from New York State and named their new town "New Albany" after the capital of their home state. It is located in downtown New Albany, on the southeast corner of State and Main Streets near the Sherman Minton Bridge. It is the oldest building in New Albany.

Joel built the house in 1813-1814 using the ash, oak, and poplar trees that were cut down when clearing the property. It is designed in a New England Federal style. In total, it is 2 1/2 stories. The first floor features two parlors and a hall. The second floor has 3 bedrooms. Both these floors have a rear porch that allowed a view of the Ohio River. The ground floor is the large kitchen with a wide fireplace used for cooking.

The house passed through the family until the final owner, Harriet Scribner, a member of the Daughters of the American Revolution, sold it to the Piankeshaw Chapter of the National Society Daughters of the American Revolution, who made sure to keep it as Harriet left it when she died later that year. In 1977 it was put on the National Register of Historic Places.

Twice a year open house events are held, the third Saturday in May and the first Sunday in December. The December open house includes a Victorian tea Other tours can be made by appointment. All third grade children in Floyd County also visit Scribner House during the school year.

== See also ==
- List of attractions and events in the Louisville metropolitan area
- National Register of Historic Places listings in Floyd County, Indiana
