= Old Pike Inn =

- U.S. National Register of Historic Places
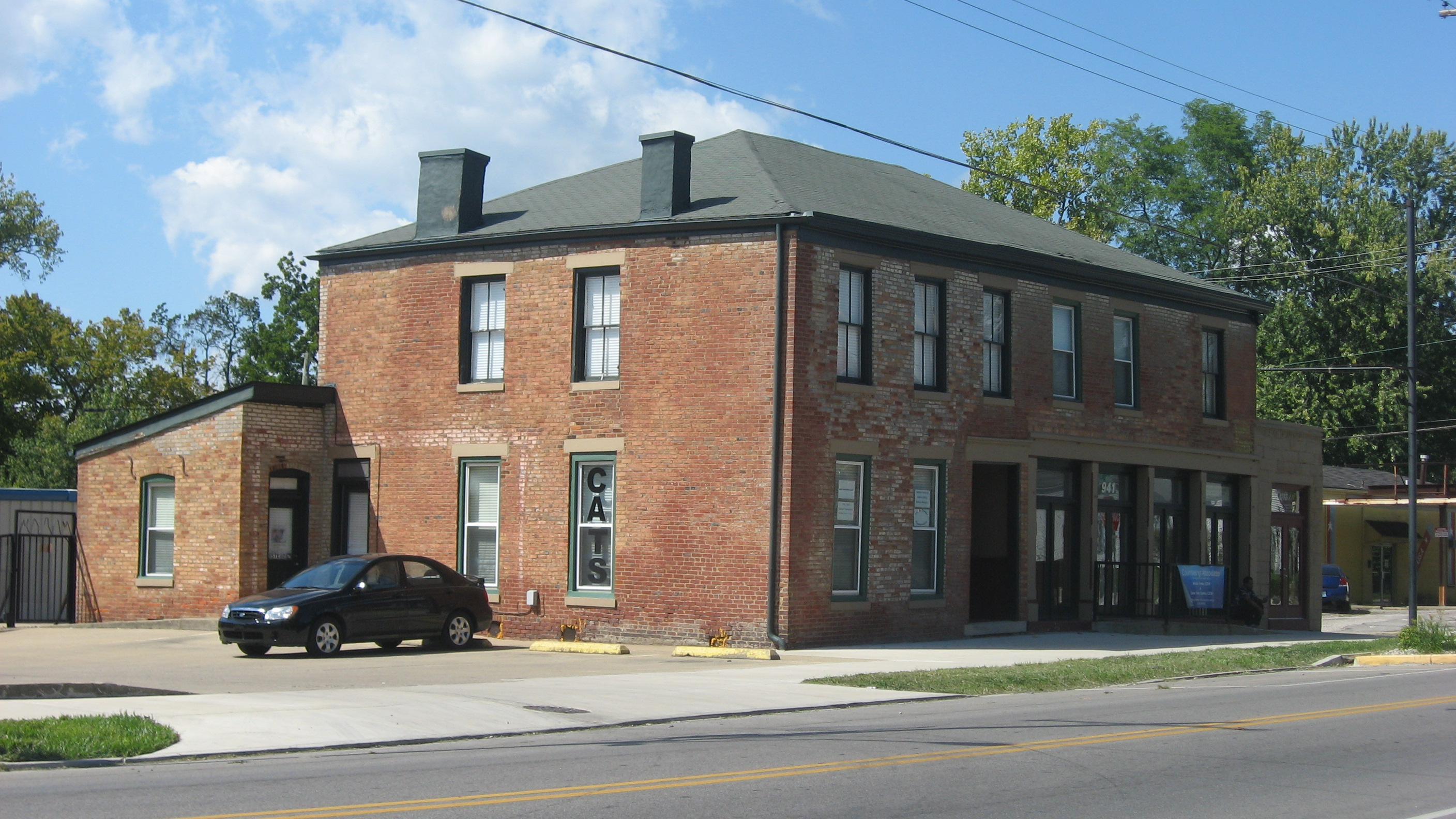

- Location within Indiana Location within the United States
- Location: 941 State St., New Albany, Indiana
- Coordinates: 38°17′35.86″N 85°49′44.16″W
- Area: less than one acre
- Built: c. 1840
- Architectural style: Early Republic
- NRHP reference No.: 01000358
- Added to NRHP: April 12, 2001

The Old Pike Inn is a historic inn and tavern located at New Albany, Indiana. It was built about 1840, and is a two-story brick building with a hipped roof. The building was damaged in a tornado on March 23, 1917, and the building rebuilt. It remained a working tavern until 1997, when the owner decided to shut down and start working for Caesars Indiana.

It was listed on the National Register of Historic Places in 2001.
