= Cedar Bough Place Historic District =

Historic district in Indiana, United States

- U.S. National Register of Historic Places
- U.S. Historic district
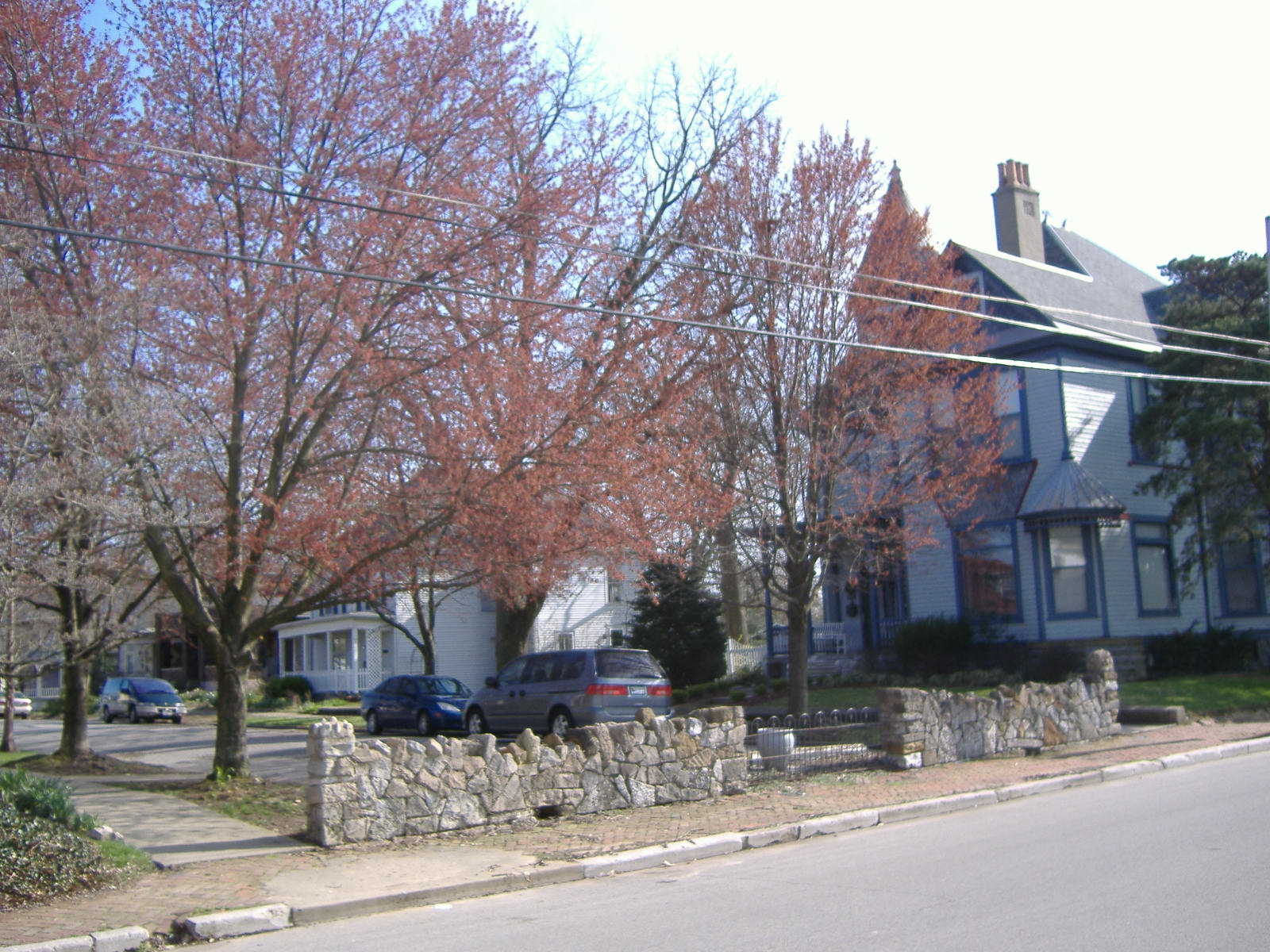
- North Entrance

- Location within Indiana Location within the United States
- Location: 800 blk. of Cedar Bough Pl., New Albany, Indiana
- Coordinates: 38°17′39″N 85°48′51″W
- Area: 4.3 acres (1.7 ha)
- Architectural style: Vernacular Victorian, Queen Anne, Bungalow, Airplane Bungalow and American Foursquare
- NRHP reference No.: 08000188
- Added to NRHP: March 19, 2008

Cedar Bough Place Historic District is a national historic district located at New Albany, Indiana, ¾ of a mile from the Ohio River, across from Louisville, Kentucky. It consists of the 800-block of the road Cedar Bough Place, between Beeler and Ekin Avenues.

== Description ==
Twenty-five primary buildings, seven outbuildings, and one fence contribute to the historic nature of the neighborhood, all of which built from 1883 to 1920. These buildings are primarily of Vernacular Victorian and Queen Anne style, but examples of Bungalow, Airplane Bungalow and American Foursquare are also in the district. Most houses in the district were built between 1891 and 1905.

== History ==
The district was originally part of 70 acres (280,000 m^{2}) owned by the Loughrey family in the early 19th century. The 70 acres (280,000 m^{2}) would be divided into twenty plots, with sizes ranging from two to 10 acres (40,000 m^{2}). Lot #6 was 5 acres (20,000 m^{2}), and would become Cedar Bough Place.

When Lot 42 of the Illinois Land Grant was divided, Cedar Bough Place was laid off into lots, roads, etc. and sold on the 17th day of September, 1836 by Margaret Loughrey with the following provision: "and I hereby certify all roads, alleys, streets, etc., laid off of said ground to be for the common benefit of the purchasers and owners of said lots. The streets and alleys cannot be opened to the public without 90% of the property owners voting for the street being dedicated as a public street."

Private streets were created as a way for residential landowners to control real estate speculation and maintain property standards, in an era before the protections of zoning.

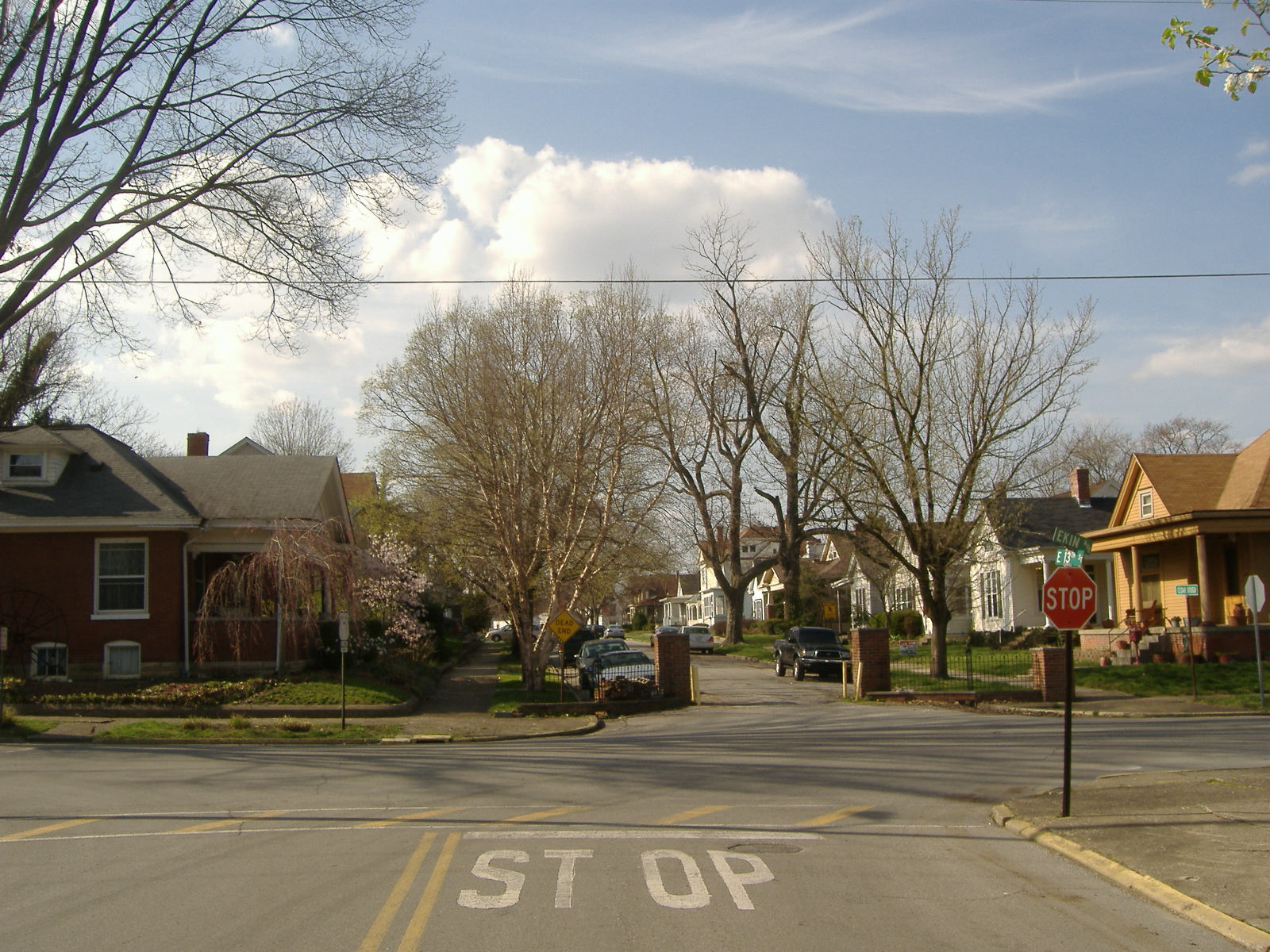
South Entrance

Construction in the neighborhood was started by Andros Huncilman 50 years later in 1890, at the end of the prosperous post-Civil War era in New Albany's history. Huncilman owned a 5-acre (20,000 m^{2}) lot that would comprise the district. Throughout its history it has been a private street; with ownership of the street divided among the property owners.

By deed restriction, Cedar Bough Place is one of the first private streets in the United States. Lucas Place, the first private street in St. Louis, Missouri, was dedicated 15 years later, in 1851. That private street no longer exists. The oldest existing private street in St. Louis, Missouri is Lafayette Square, which dates to 1868, was dedicated 32 years after Cedar Bough Place was created and made private by Loughrey's deed restriction.

No other city near New Albany, including Louisville, has private streets (although Louisville does have private alleys), and Cedar Bough Place is the only private street in New Albany.

A long-standing fence that contributes to the historic nature of the neighborhood is on the north side, and is a central wrought iron connecting two original stone walls keeping traffic from entering the private road. The southern fence is just wide enough for a single vehicle. Built in 1970 to replace the original entrance, it is not part of the historic fabric of the district.

== Prominent residents ==
- Bernard Hock (American table tennis champion)
- Ferdinand N. Kahler (inventor and automobile manufacturer)
- F. Shirley Wilcox (Indiana's chief of Internal Revenue Service collections {appointed by President Harry Truman} and Indiana State Treasurer)

== Present day ==
In 1994 an architectural study determined that Shelby Place could eventually achieve National Register status. In 2006 the Indiana Department of Natural Resources gave a grant of $6,150 to the city of New Albany to prepare Cedar Bough Place, DePauw Avenue Historic District, and Shelby Place Historic District for registration on the National Register of Historic Places. All three neighborhoods were placed on the National Register on March 19, 2008.
