= Beard–Kerr Farm =

- U.S. National Register of Historic Places
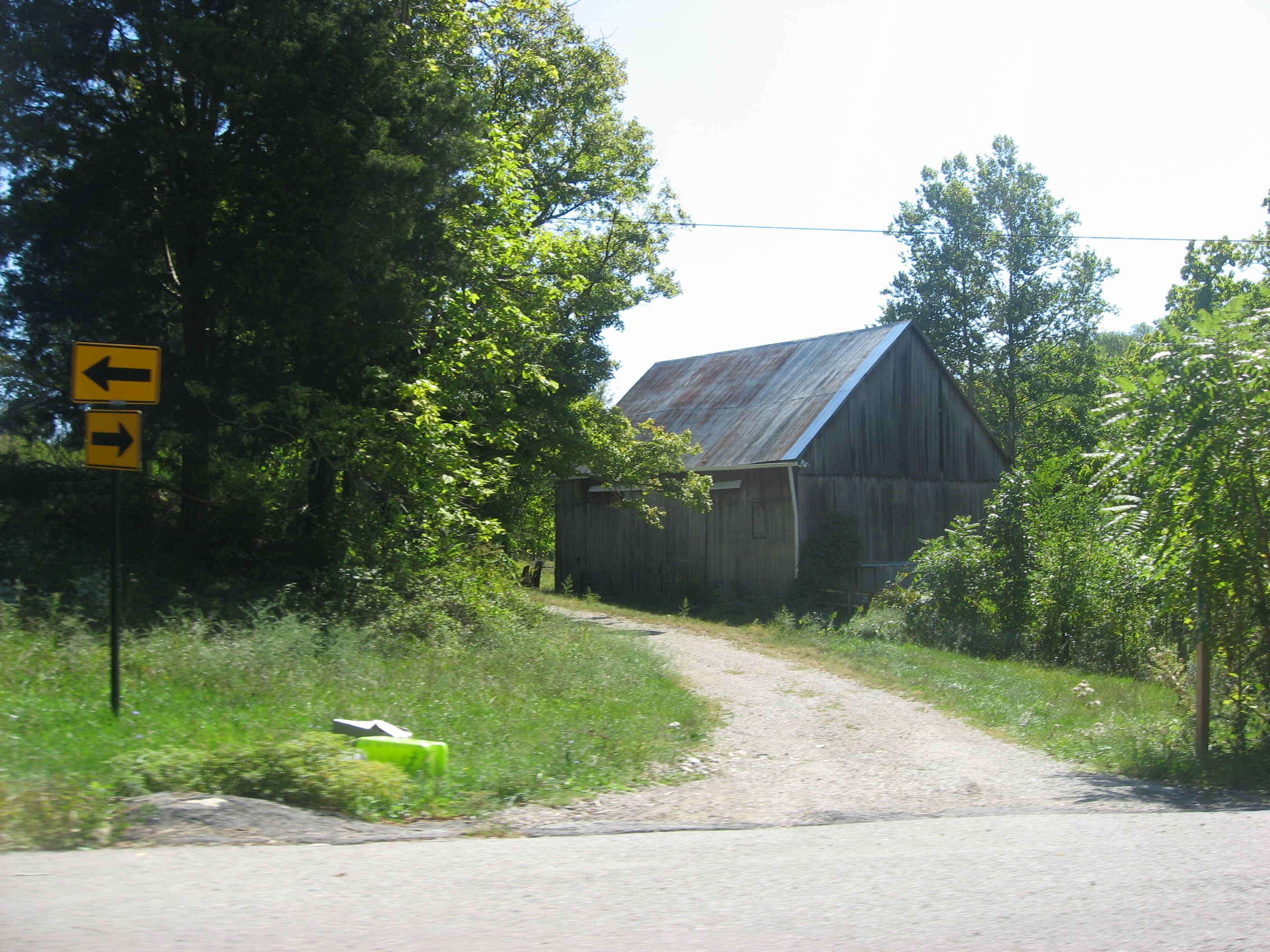
- Beard–Kerr Farm barn, September 2012

- Location within Indiana Location within the United States
- Location: 502 Georgetown-Lanesville Rd., southwest of Georgetown, Georgetown Township, Floyd County, Indiana
- Coordinates: 38°16′47″N 85°58′42″W
- Area: 3.48 acres (1.41 ha)
- Built: c. 1827; 199 years ago
- Architectural style: Greek Revival
- NRHP reference No.: 12001057
- Added to NRHP: December 19, 2012

Beard–Kerr Farm is a historic home and farm located in Georgetown Township, Floyd County, Indiana. The farmhouse was built about 1827, and is a two-story, Greek Revival style brick I-house. It has a one-story brick extension with a low-pitched saltbox roof and front porch. Also on the property are the contributing wood-frame summer kitchen, livestock barn, garage, privy, and corn crib.

It was listed on the National Register of Historic Places in 2012.
