= Georgetown Township, Floyd County, Indiana =

Georgetown Township
- Township
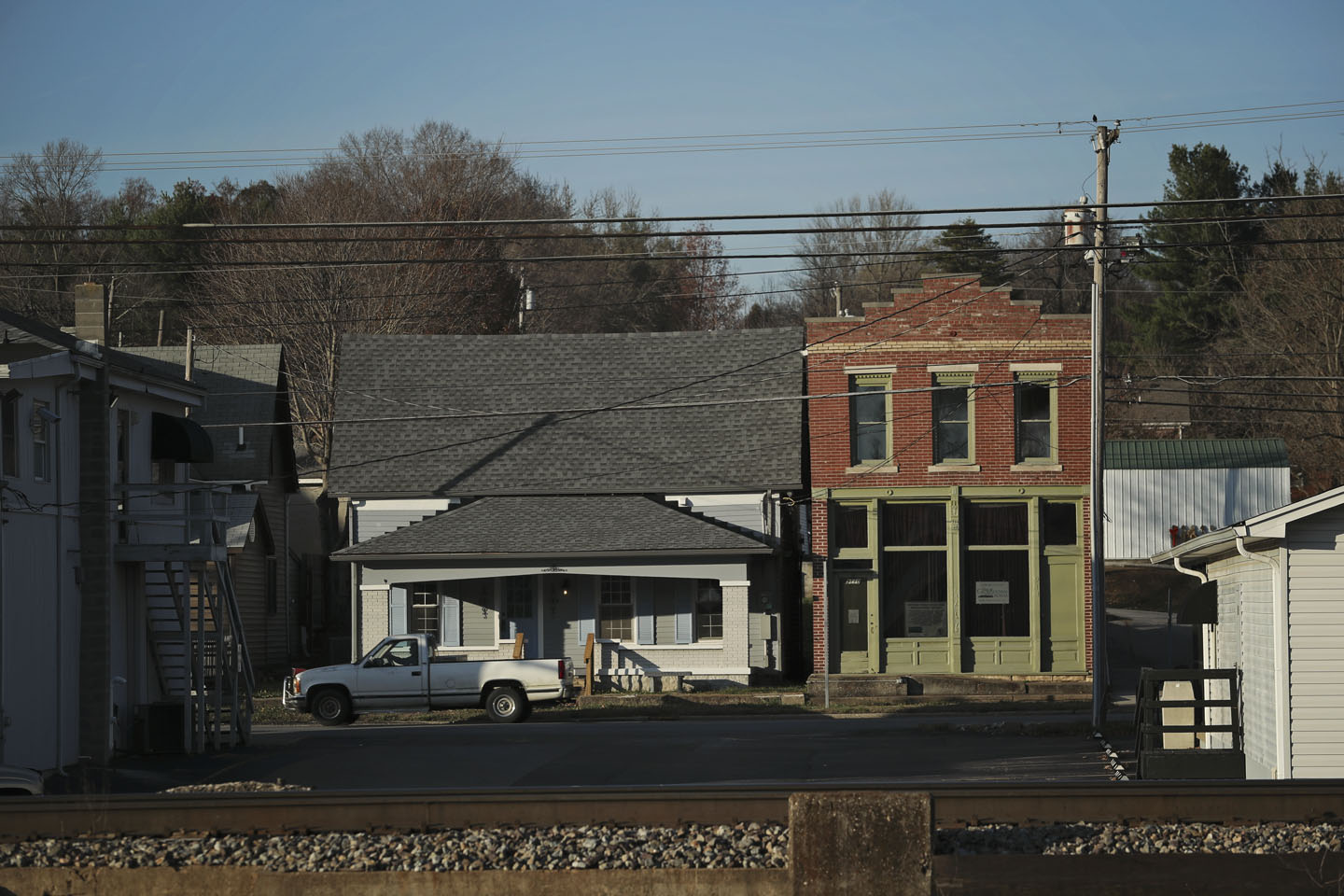
- Railroad tracks in the foreground as some of Georgetown's original architecture is seen along Highway 64. Georgetown along Highway 64

- Location of Georgetown Township in Floyd County
- Coordinates: 38°18′02″N 85°56′57″W
- Country: United States
- State: Indiana
- County: Floyd

Government
  - Type: Indiana township

Area
  - Total: 26.76 sq mi (69.3 km^{2})
  - Land: 26.63 sq mi (69.0 km^{2})
  - Water: 0.13 sq mi (0.34 km^{2})
- Elevation: 794 ft (242 m)

Population (2020)
  - Total: 11,143
  - Density: 361.7/sq mi (139.7/km^{2})
- FIPS code: 18-27342
- GNIS feature ID: 453324

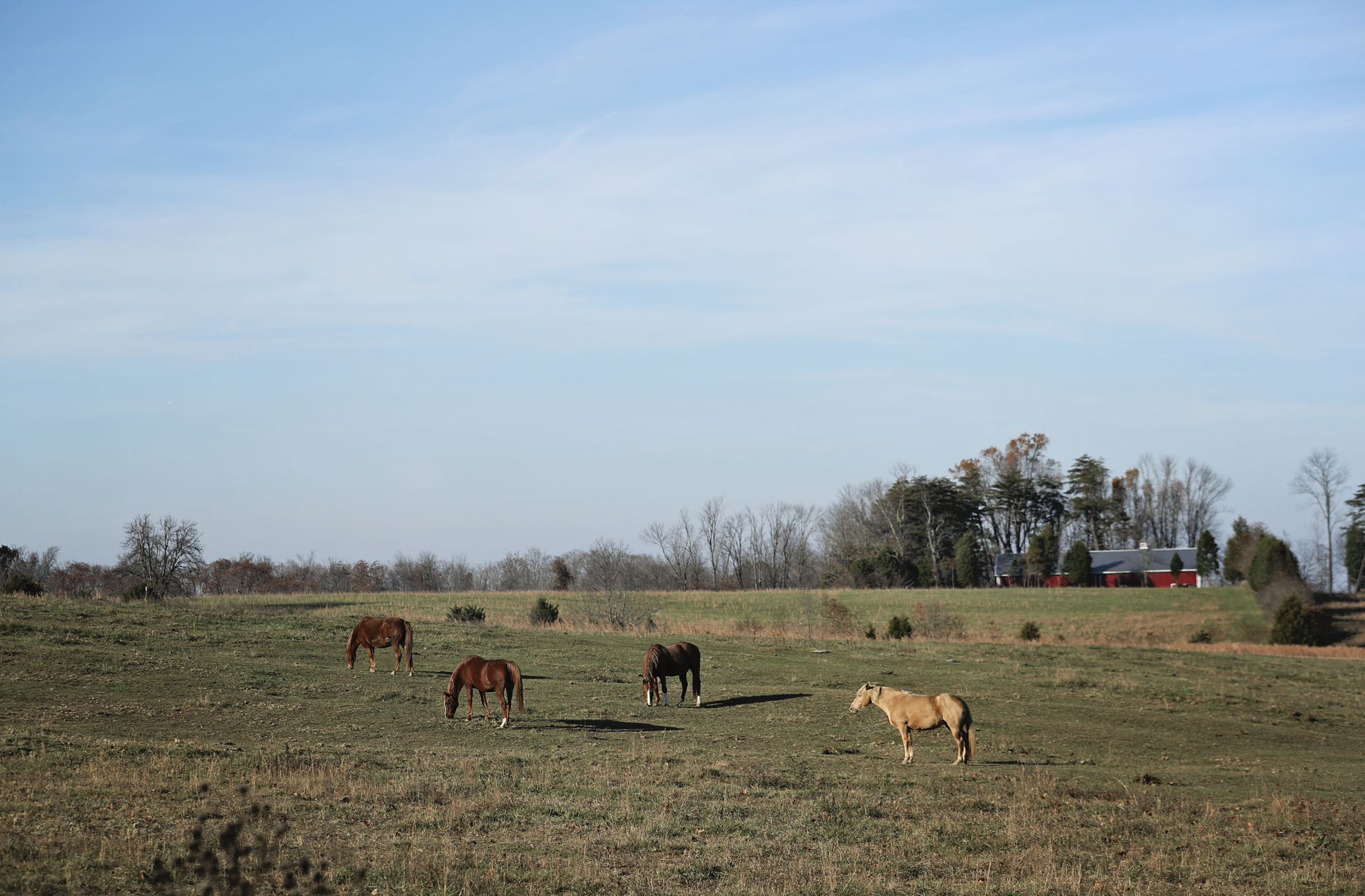
Horses graze on a farm along Henriott Road in Georgetown Township.

Georgetown Township is one of five townships in Floyd County, Indiana. As of the 2010 census, its population was 9,632 and it contained 3,733 housing units.

== History ==
The Beard-Kerr Farm was listed on the National Register of Historic Places in 2012.

== Geography ==
According to the 2010 census, the township has a total area of 26.76 square miles (69.3 km^{2}), of which 26.63 square miles (69.0 km^{2}) (or 99.51%) is land and 0.13 square miles (0.34 km^{2}) (or 0.49%) is water. Indian Creek runs through Georgetown Township originating from Galena, Indiana to the northeast.

=== Cities and towns ===
- Georgetown

=== Unincorporated towns ===
- Edwardsville

=== Adjacent townships ===
- Lafayette Township (northeast)
- New Albany Township (east)
- Franklin Township (southeast)
- Franklin Township, Harrison County (southwest)
- Jackson Township, Harrison County (west)
- Greenville Township (northwest)

=== Major highways ===
- Interstate 64
- Indiana State Road 11
- Indiana State Road 62
- Indiana State Road 64
