= Gabriel Farnsley House =

Historic house in Indiana, United States

- U.S. National Register of Historic Places
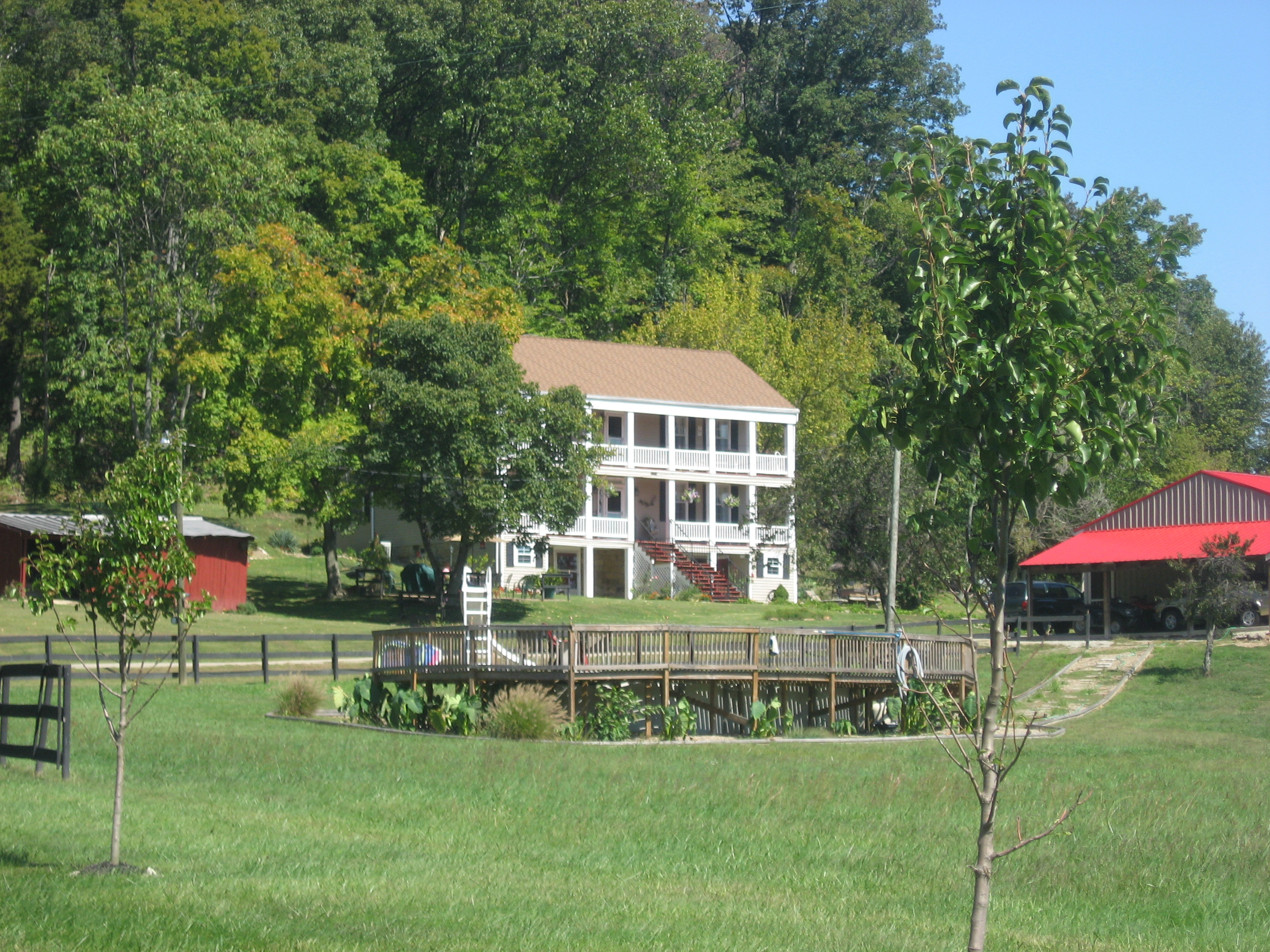
- Gabriel Farnsley House, September 2012

- Location within Indiana Location within the United States
- Location: North of Bridgeport off State Road 111, Franklin Township, Floyd County, Indiana
- Coordinates: 38°11′19″N 85°54′26″W
- Area: 1 acre (0.40 ha)
- Built: c. 1856
- Architectural style: Plantation House Style
- NRHP reference No.: 82000037
- Added to NRHP: September 23, 1982

Gabriel Farnsley House, also known as the Behrens House, is a historic home located in Franklin Township, Floyd County, Indiana. It was built about 1856, and is a two-story, five-bay, plantation-style frame dwelling. It has clapboard siding, a one-story rear shed addition, and features a two-tier front gallery supported by square piers.

It was listed on the National Register of Historic Places in 1982.
