= Franklin Township, Floyd County, Indiana =

Franklin Township
- Township
- Location of Franklin Township in Floyd County
- Coordinates: 38°14′07″N 85°54′51″W
- Country: United States
- State: Indiana
- County: Floyd

Government
  - Type: Indiana township

Area
  - Total: 23.53 sq mi (60.9 km^{2})
  - Land: 23.4 sq mi (61 km^{2})
  - Water: 0.13 sq mi (0.34 km^{2})
- Elevation: 538 ft (164 m)

Population (2020)
  - Total: 1,547
  - Density: 64.1/sq mi (24.7/km^{2})
- FIPS code: 18-25360
- GNIS feature ID: 453301

Franklin Township is one of five townships in Floyd County, Indiana. As of the 2010 census, its population was 1,499 and it contained 621 housing units. Franklin Township, along with Lafayette Township, are the only two townships in the county without an incorporated community, and is by far the least populous township in the county.

== History ==
The Gabriel Farnsley House was listed on the National Register of Historic Places in 1982.

== Geography ==
According to the 2010 census, the township has a total area of 23.53 square miles (60.9 km^{2}), of which 23.4 square miles (61 km^{2}) (or 99.45%) is land and 0.13 square miles (0.34 km^{2}) (or 0.55%) is water. Arrowhead Lake is in this township.

=== Unincorporated towns ===
(This list is based on USGS data and may include former settlements.)

- Buchanan

=== Adjacent townships ===
- New Albany Township (northeast)
- Posey Township, Harrison County (southwest)
- Franklin Township, Harrison County (west)
- Georgetown Township (northwest)

=== Major highways ===
- Indiana State Road 11
- Indiana State Road 62
- Indiana State Road 111

=== Cemeteries ===
The township contains four cemeteries: Bailey, Hopewell, Wheeler and Wolfe.
