= DePauw Avenue Historic District =

National historic district in New Albany, Indiana

- U.S. National Register of Historic Places
- U.S. Historic district
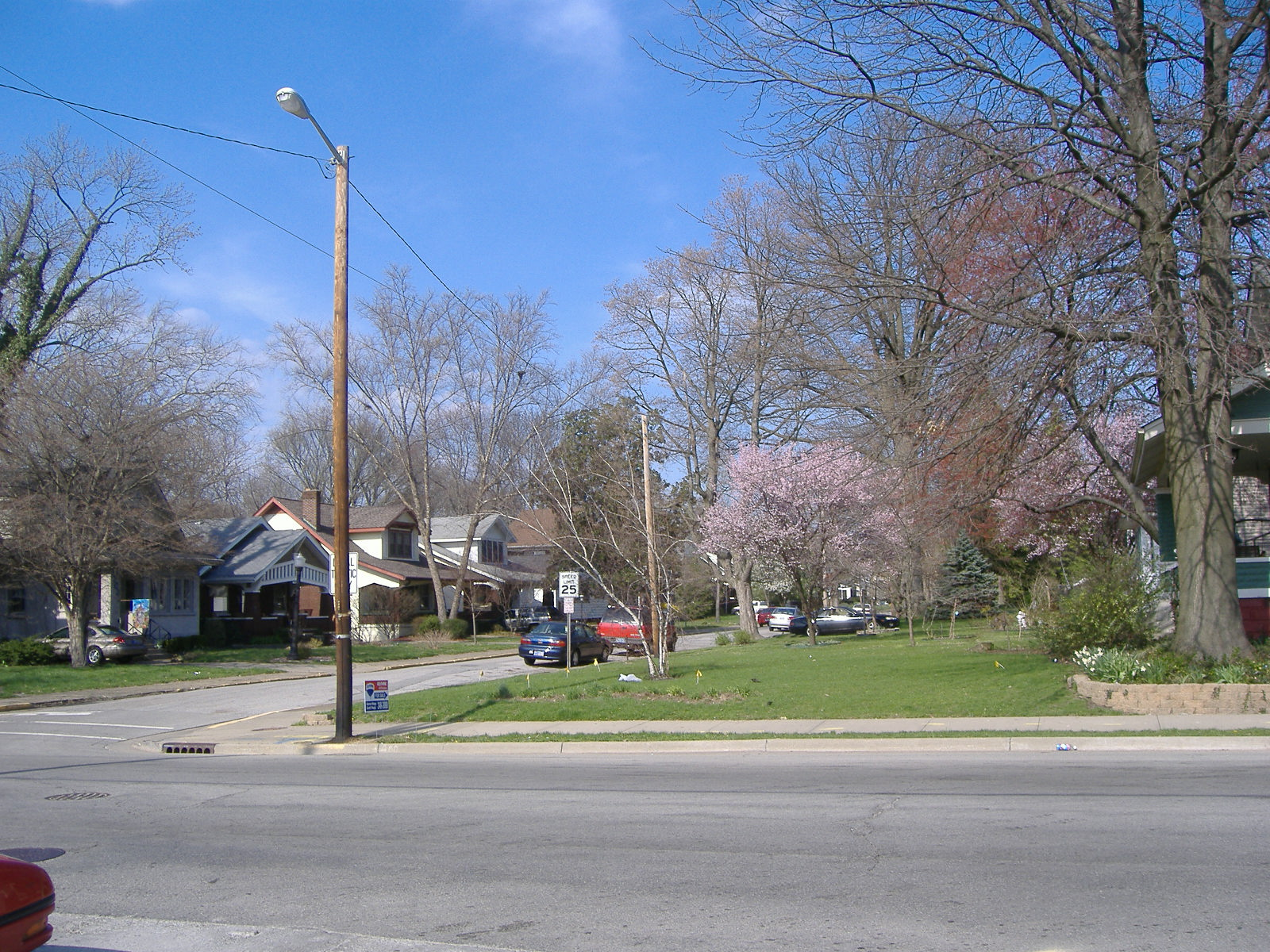
- Western end of Depauw Avenue

- Location within Indiana Location within the United States
- Location: Roughly DePauw Ave. from Vincennes St. to Abersold Dr.; 1200 blk. of Beechwood Ave.; 1211 & 1214 Vance St., New Albany, Indiana
- Coordinates: 38°18′06″N 85°48′39″W
- Area: 15.5 acres (6.3 ha)
- Architect: Spath, Adam; et.al.
- Architectural style: Queen Anne, Colonial Revival
- NRHP reference No.: 08000189
- Added to NRHP: March 19, 2008

The DePauw Avenue Historic District is a national historic district just northeast of downtown New Albany, Indiana, across the Ohio River from Louisville, Kentucky. The district consists mostly of Depauw Avenue from Vincennes Street in the west to Aebersold Drive to the east, and includes portions of the 1200 block of Beechwood Avenue and two residences on Vance Street. New Albany High School is located on the southern edge of the district.

Depauw Avenue is named for New Albany's Depauw family. Washington C. DePauw, a wealthy New Albany banker, was the original owner of the land. He made the bulk of his money from the American Glass Works, which by 1890 produced two thirds of the plate glass in the United States. His summer estate was what became Depauw Avenue. His son Charles Depauw started developing the land, but the first buildings were constructed after Charles died, leaving it to his widow Letitia. The district began as a neighborhood for upper-class residents, and quickly became a preferred place to live in New Albany. The initial four properties were built between 1906 and 1908, an additional four in 1911, and the bulk of the remainder built in the 1920s. Construction slowed during the Great Depression, and then concluded in the 1940s.

Of the seventy-one primary buildings in the district, sixty-eight are considered to contribute to the historic integrity of the district, with fifteen contributing outbuildings. Architectural styles are a mix of Colonial Revival, Craftsman/Bungalow (of which 39 of the district's 68 domiciles are), Dutch Colonial Revival, Queen Anne, and Tudor Revival. Residences on the eastern side of the district are long and are affected by the creekbed that runs by the district.

In 1994 an architectural study determined that DePauw Avenue could eventually achieve National Register status. In 2006 the Indiana Department of Natural Resources gave a grant of $6,150 to the city of New Albany to prepare DePauw Avenue, Cedar Bough Place Historic District, and the Shelby Place Historic District for registration on the National Register of Historic Places. (Depauw Avenue has an architectural style similar to Shelby Place's, but contains mostly larger domiciles, showing more architectural diversity.) All three neighborhoods were placed on the National Register on March 19, 2008.
