= New Albany Downtown Historic District (Indiana) =

Historic district in Indiana, United States

- U.S. National Register of Historic Places
- U.S. Historic district
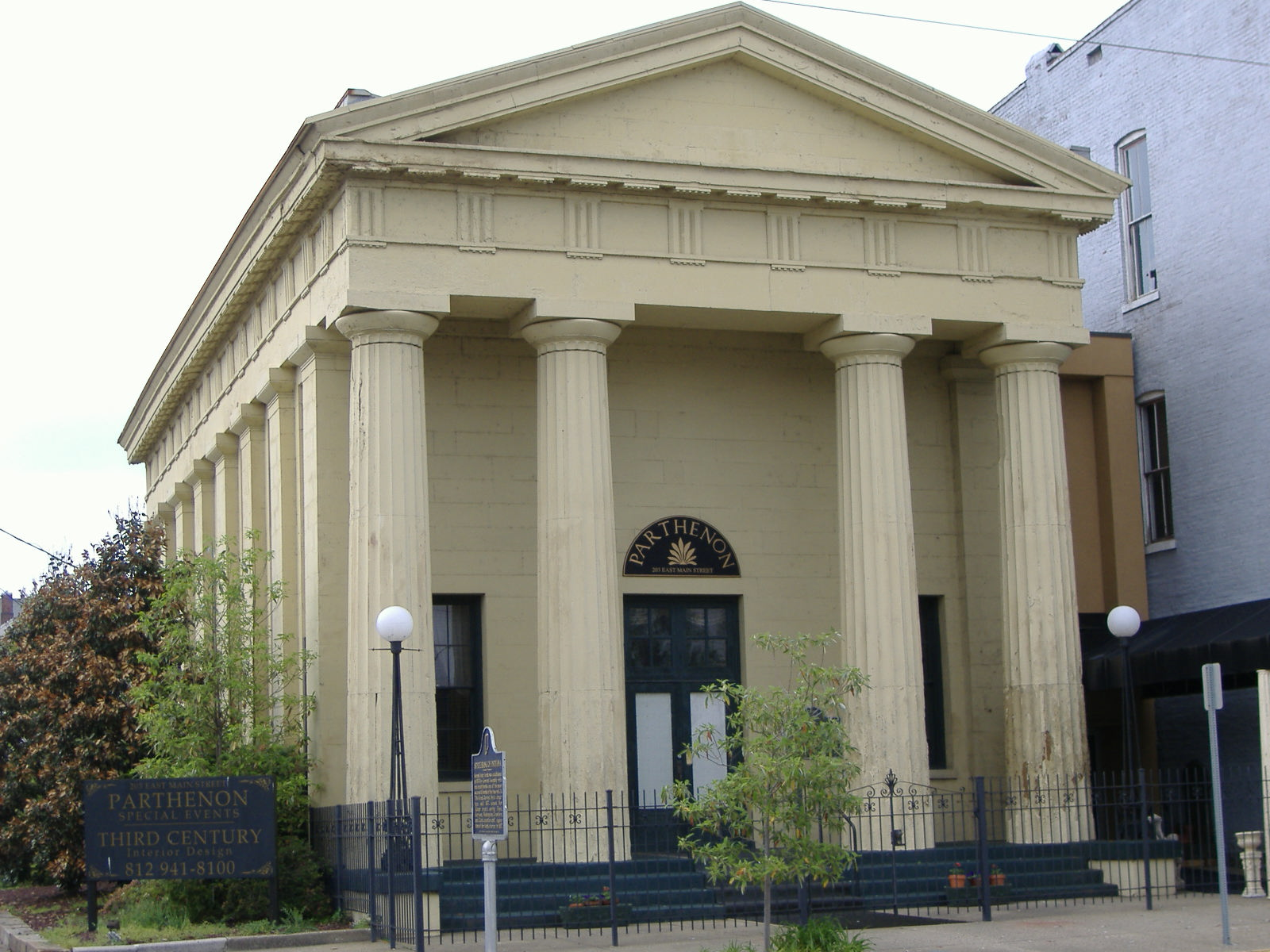
- Old State Bank

- Location within Indiana Location within the United States
- Location: Roughly between W. First St., and E. Fifth St.; W. Main St. to E. Spring St., New Albany, Indiana
- Coordinates: 38°17′07″N 85°49′18″W
- Area: 49.5 acres (20.0 ha)
- Built: 1937
- Architect: Pugh, Hugh; et.al.
- Architectural style: Italianate, Federal
- NRHP reference No.: 99001074
- Added to NRHP: September 3, 1999

The New Albany Downtown Historic District is a national historic district located at New Albany, Indiana. The general area is W. First Street to the west, Spring St. to the north, E. Fifth Street to the east, and Main Street to the south. The local specification of the district is between East Fifth Street to West Fifth Street, Culbertson Street to the north, and the Ohio River to the south. East Spring Street Historic District is immediately east of the area, and the Main Street section of the Mansion Row Historic District starts. The area includes the Scribner House, where the founders of New Albany lived. It is also the focal area of the Harvest Homecoming Festival every October.

Architectural styles vary, including Beaux-Arts, Chicago Commercial, Federal, Greek Revival, Italianate, Neoclassical, and Renaissance Revival. Prominent buildings in the district include:

- Elsby Building (1916, Neoclassical)
- Firestone Building (1937, Art Moderne)
- New Albany Carnegie Library (1902): Now the Carnegie Center for Art and History
- Sears Automotive (Art Deco)
- Town Clock Church (1852, Greek Revival): Originally the Second Presbyterian Church and served the Underground Railroad, it is now the Second Baptist Church.
- Woolworth Building (1910, Chicago Commercial): Site of the chain's first luncheonette.

It was listed on the National Register of Historic Places in 1999.

== Gallery ==
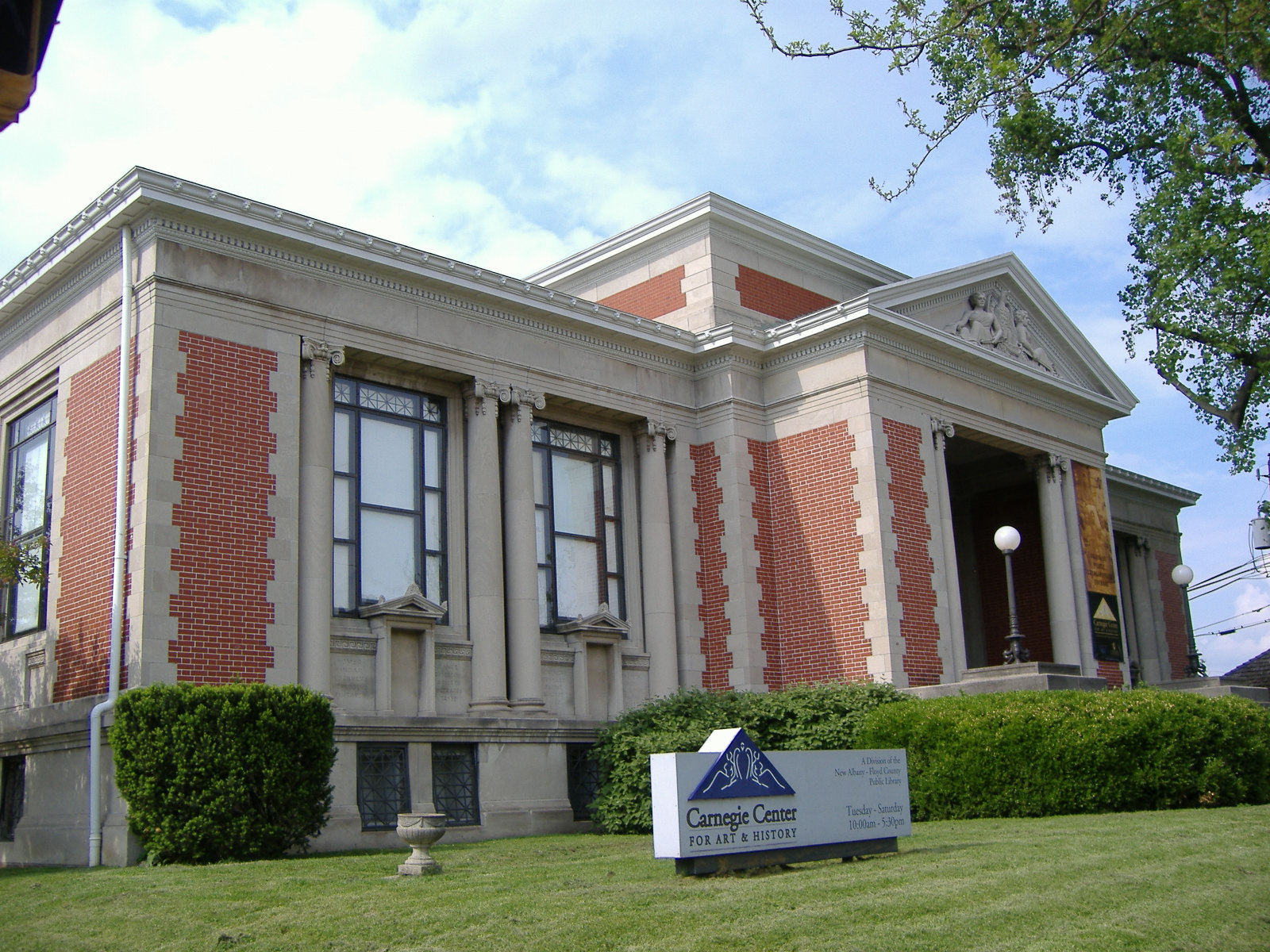
Carnegie Center for Art and History

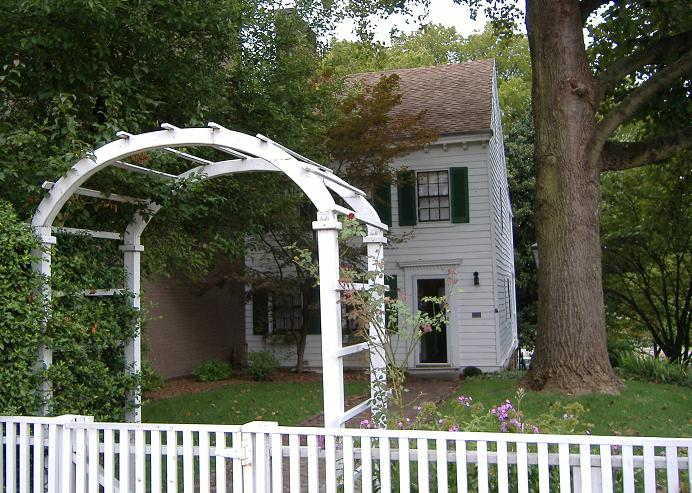
Scribner House

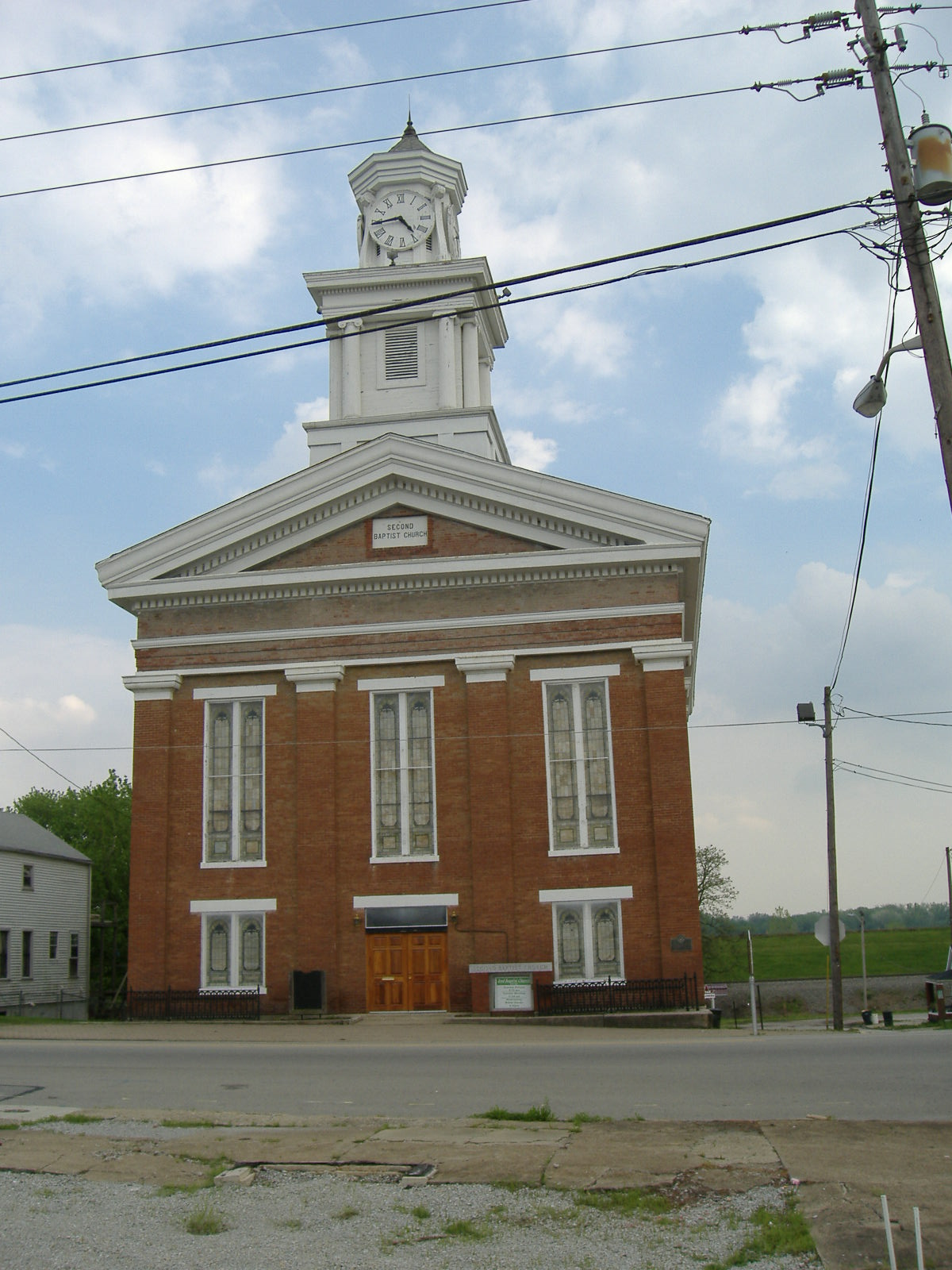
Town Clock Church

== See also ==
- List of attractions and events in the Louisville metropolitan area
