= Division Street School =

- U.S. National Register of Historic Places
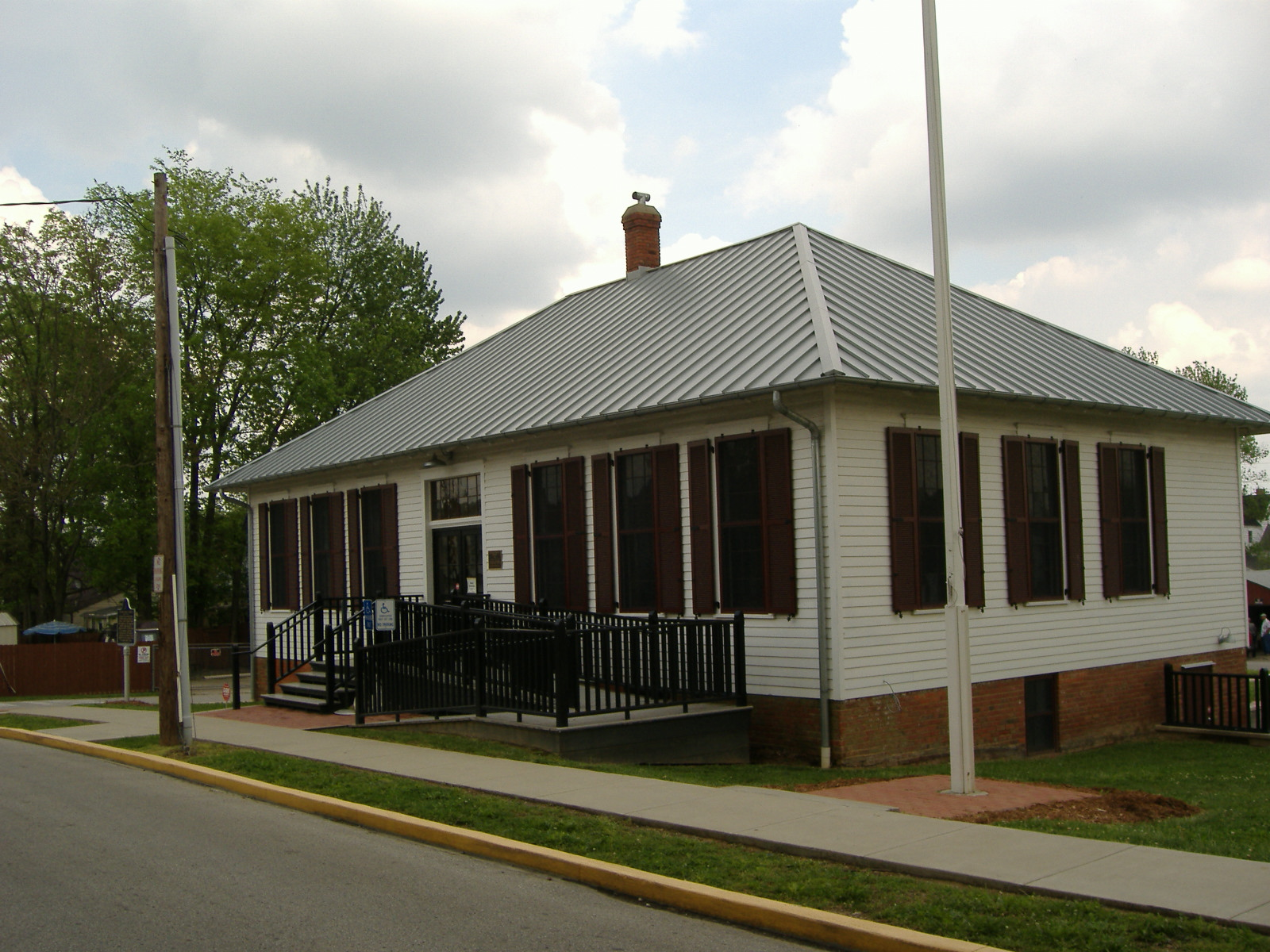

- Location within Indiana Location within the United States
- Location: 1803 Conservative St., New Albany, Indiana
- Coordinates: 38°17′35″N 85°48′18″W
- Area: less than one acre
- Built: 1884
- Built by: Fite, Andrew; Kahl, Philip
- MPS: Indiana's Public Common and High Schools MPS
- NRHP reference No.: 02000193
- Added to NRHP: July 15, 2002

The Division Street School is a historic school building located at New Albany, Indiana. It was one of the first elementary schools for African-American children, with construction beginning in June 1884, and the opening in 1885. It was moved by thirty feet westward in 1922. It was untouched by the Ohio River flood of 1937. It operated as a school until May 1946, while segregation still took place; those students still attended were assigned to Griffin Street School. From 1946 until 1948 it was a Veterans Administration Office. It was then used as a maintenance shop for the New Albany/Floyd County School Corporation until 1999. After restoration, it is now used for various community activities.

It was listed on the National Register of Historic Places in 2002.

== Gallery ==
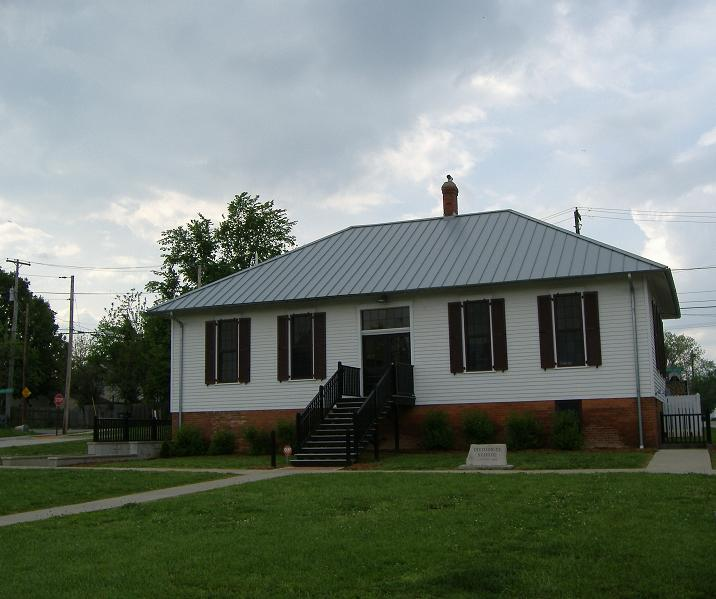
Back side of school
