= William Culbertson =

William Culbertson may refer to:

- William Culbertson (businessman), U.S. businessman from Indiana
- William Constantine Culbertson (1825–1906), U.S. Representative from Pennsylvania
- William Wirt Culbertson (1835–1911), U.S. Representative from Kentucky
- William Smith Culbertson (1884–1966), U.S. Ambassador to Romania and Chile
- William Culbertson III (1905–1971), fifth President of the Moody Bible Institute in Chicago

== See also ==
- William Louis Culberson, lichenologist
