= Indiana Steam Clock =

Clock in Indianapolis, Indiana, U.S.

Coordinates: 39.7692°N 86.1695°W

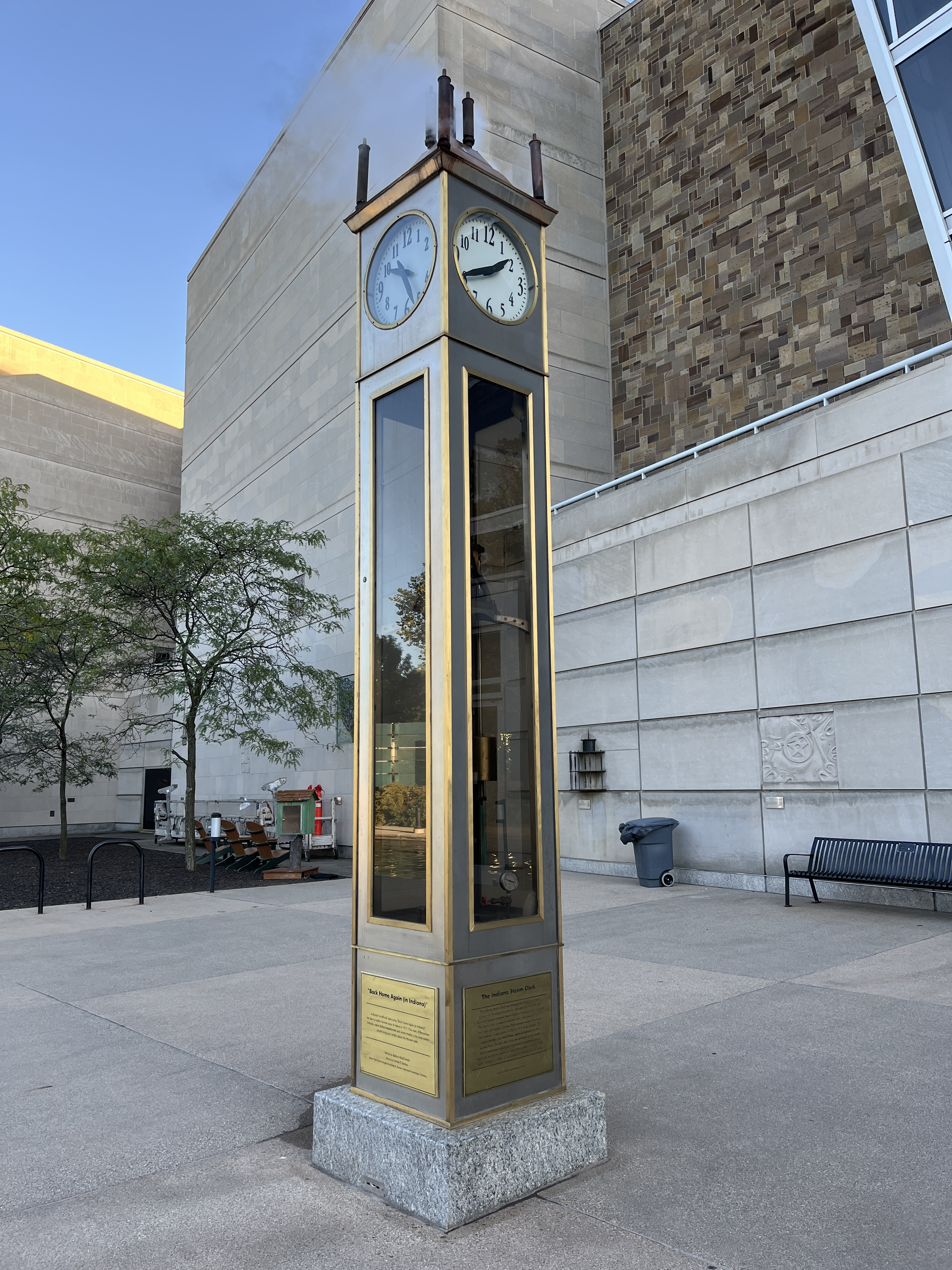
- The steam clock in 2024
- Location: Indianapolis, Indiana, U.S.
- Location within Indiana
- Coordinates

The Indiana Steam Clock is a steam clock installed outside the Indiana State Museum, in Indianapolis, Indiana.

== Description ==
The steam clock is 17 ft (5.2 m) tall.

== History ==
The clock was designed by Raymond Saunders and built in 2002.
