= Indiana State Museum =

Museum in Indianapolis, Indiana, US

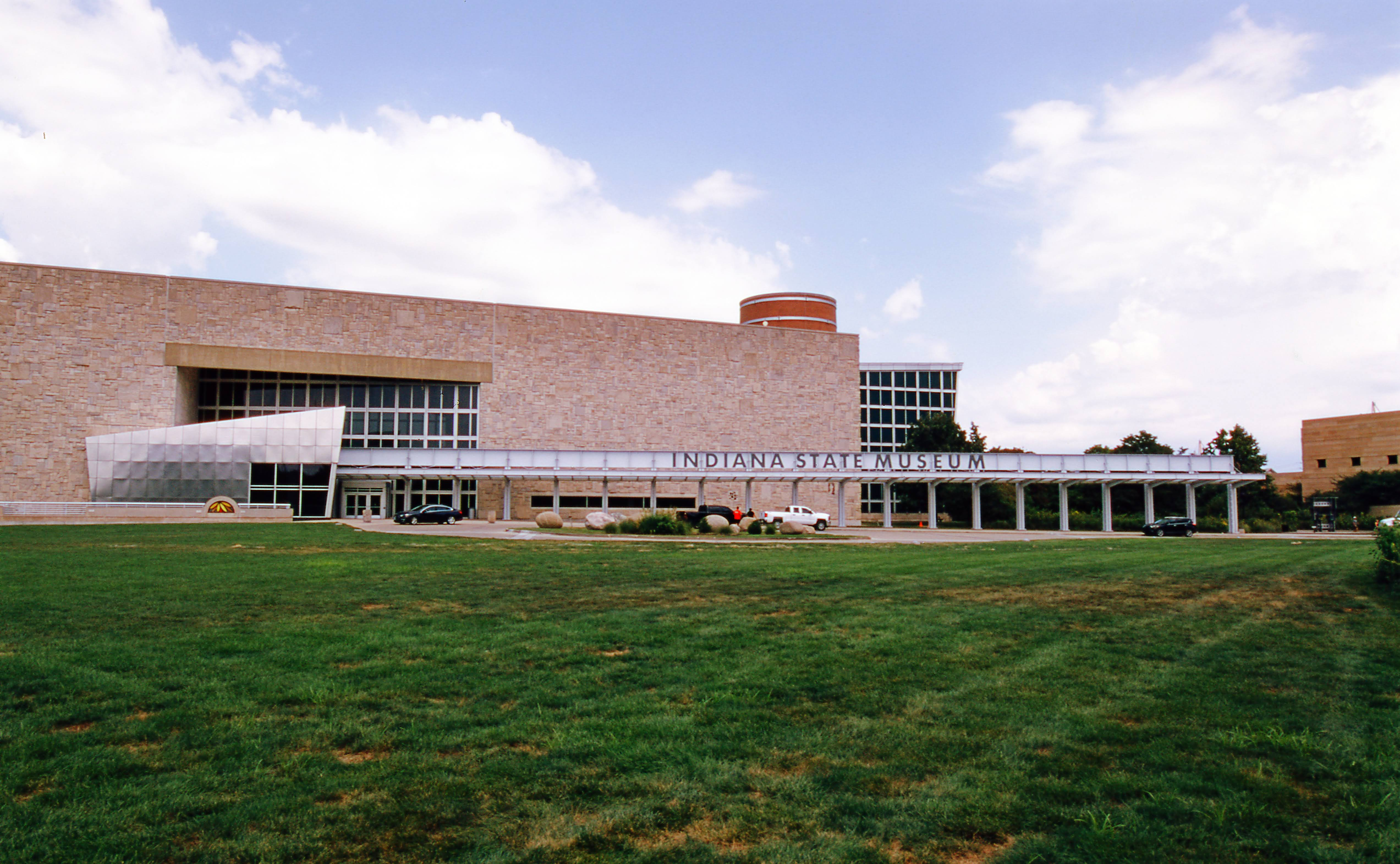
- Indiana State Museum in 2025

- Location within Indianapolis Location within Indiana Location within the United States
- Established: 1869
- Location: White River State Park, Indianapolis, Indiana, U.S.
- Coordinates: 39°46′7″N 86°10′9″W
- Type: History museum
- Director: Cathy Ferree (CEO)
- Curator: Susannah Koerber
- Architect: RATIO Design
- Owner: State of Indiana
- Public transit access: 8
- Website: www.indianamuseum.org

The Indiana State Museum is a museum located in downtown Indianapolis, Indiana, United States. The museum houses exhibits on the science, art, culture, and history of Indiana from prehistoric times to the present day.

== History ==
The original collection began in 1862 as a cabinet of curiosities collected by State Librarian R. Deloss Brown. In 1869, the Indiana General Assembly enacted a law that provided “for the collection and preservation of a Geological and Mineralogical Cabinet of the Natural History of this State”. Under the Department of Geology and Natural Science, the collection was placed in the charge of a state geologist, who was hired on a two-year term and assigned the task of surveying, organizing, and labeling the collection. Over the years, the collection grew mostly unchecked as the natural history collection increased and miscellaneous cultural items, many relating to the recent Civil War, were added forming an entirely new category of collections.

=== Indiana Statehouse ===
The museum's collection remained on display on the third floor of the Statehouse until 1919, when it was moved to the basement to make room for the Indiana Department of Conservation. When the collection was placed in the basement of the Statehouse, it fell into a state of decline for almost 45 years, where inadequate protection and preservation of items resulted in many specimens disappearing or becoming unusable. The neglect led to the museum completely closing once in the late 1920s and again in the early 1960s.

During the administration of Governor Harold W. Handley (1957–1961), the legislature authorized a Museum Study Commission to examine the State Museum, its collections, and its programs, and then propose recommendations for the future of the museum. The commission recommended that the State invest in the construction of a new facility as the Statehouse was no longer an adequate or appropriate location for the museum. The Museum would require relocation if it wished to continue its purpose of educating visitors about the history and culture of Indiana.

=== Old City Hall building ===
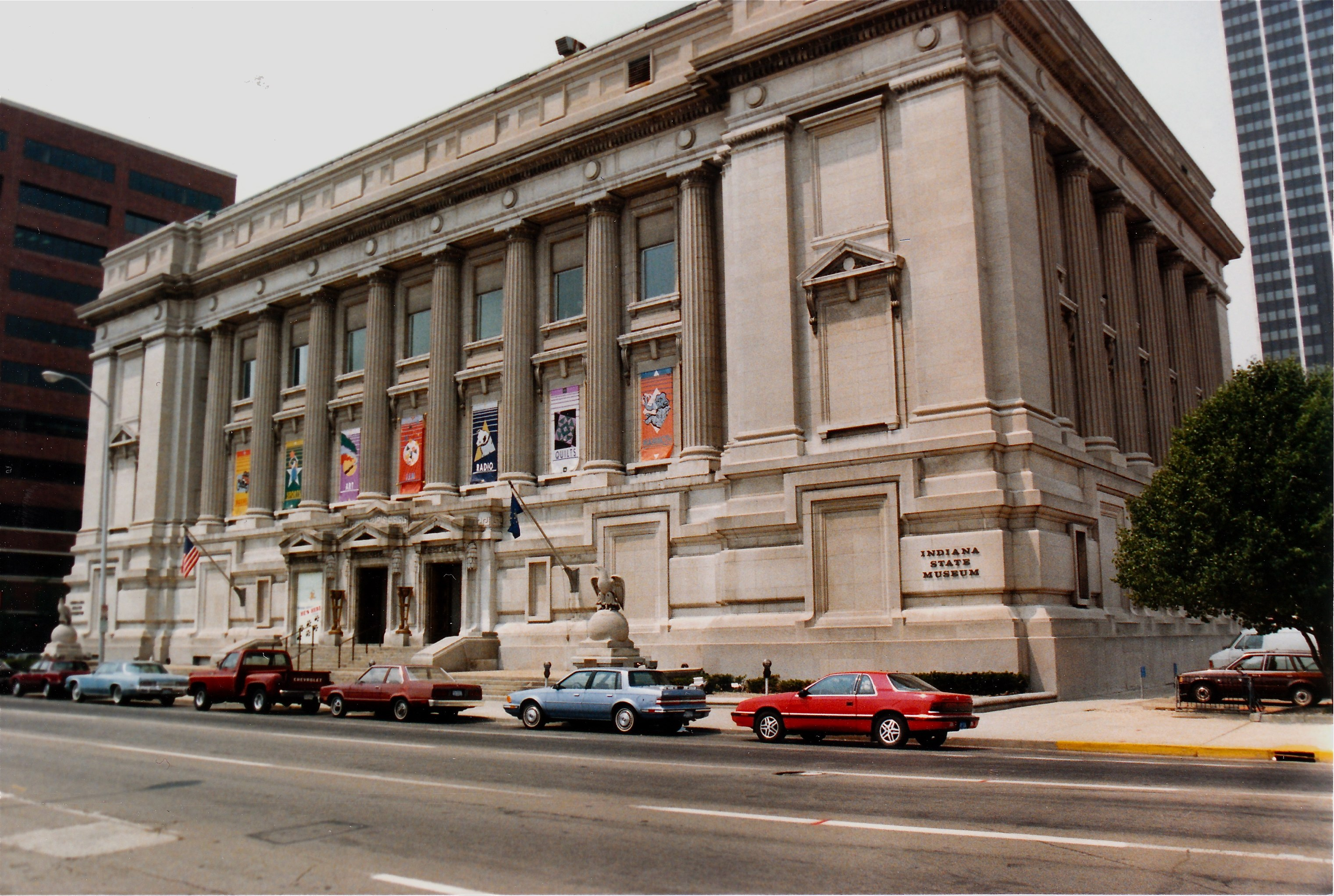
Old Indianapolis City Hall in 1988

Planning for the new location of the museum occurred largely during the administration of Governor Matthew E. Welsh (1961–1965), whom with the help of Donald E. Foltz, director of the Indiana Department of Conservation, vetted the recently vacated Indianapolis City Hall as a possible site for the museum. The old City Hall was originally designed in 1910 by Rubush and Hunter and some refurbishments would be needed make it home to a museum. In 1963, the state leased the old City Hall building and began renovations, officials dedicated and formally opened the new museum site in 1967. The museum displayed exhibits concerning Indiana's cultural and natural history through collections of Indiana art, political memorabilia, natural history specimens, geological materials, and Native American artifacts.

In 1976, the Indiana State Museum received accreditation from the American Association of Museums, now known as the American Alliance of Museums (AAM). An AAM accreditation signifies a mark of excellence to the museum community and recognizes a “museum’s commitment to and demonstration of, the professional standards for education, public service, and collections care.”

This new location of the museum attracted a new and enthusiastic audience which led to an increase in significant donations of artifacts to the collections. The museum collection began to outgrow its Old City Hall space by the late 1970s. The Museum was again on the search for a new home.

=== Move to White River State Park ===
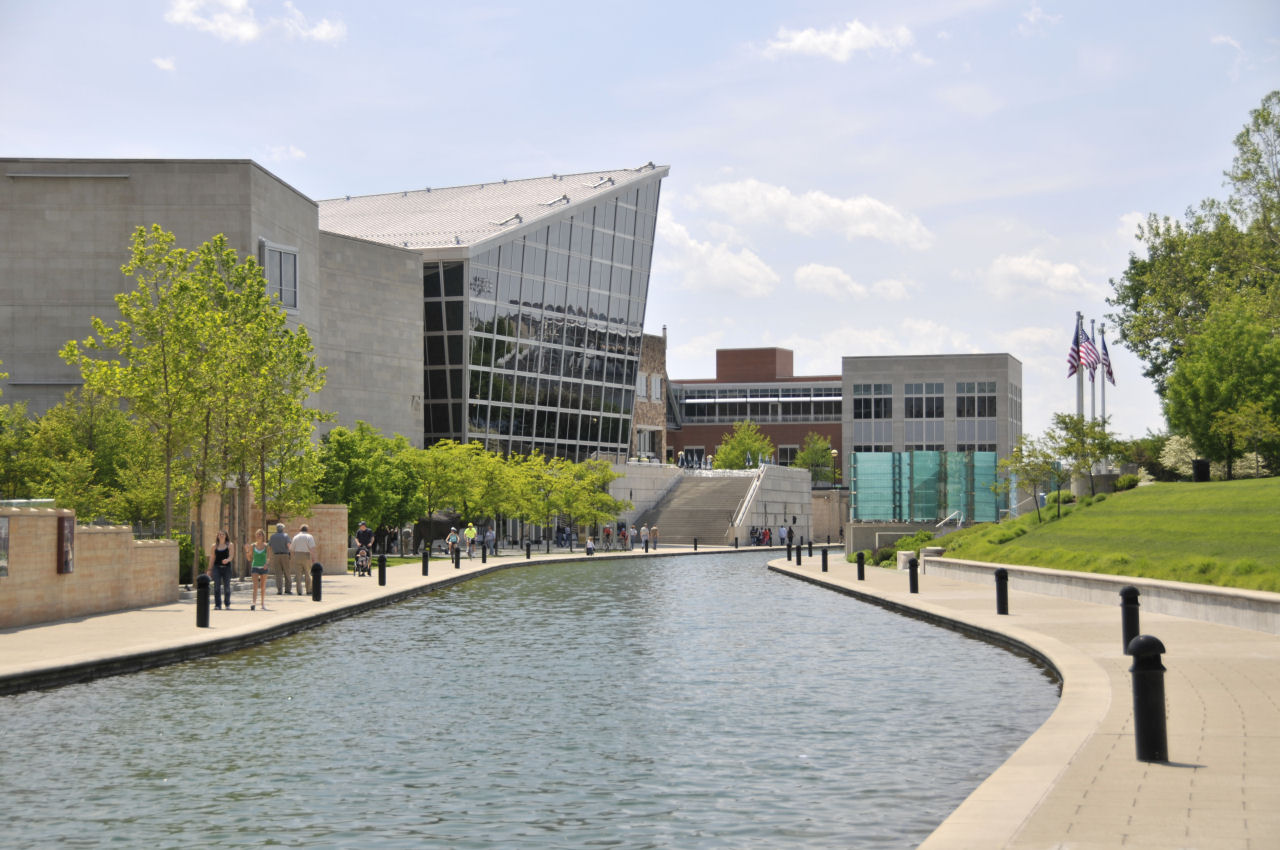
Canal and White River State Park museum building in 2008

In 1979, the Indiana General Assembly created the White River State Park Development Commission to create a new state park to celebrate Indiana, and hosting a new site for the Indiana State Museum fit ideally with the commission's plans. The museum board approved a move to the White River State Park area in 1984.

In 1995, it was announced that an IMAX theater would be built on the museum site and later the museum itself would be attached. The reasoning behind this decision had both practical and political motivations, first, it was understood at that time that ultra-large screen theaters never succeeded as stand-alone facilities, and second, that a theater was easier and cheaper to sell than the complete theater-museum package. The IMAX Theater opened in White River State Park in December 1996. The theater was later enveloped into the museum's building design in 1998.

They did not break ground for the museum site until 1999 due to a lack of immediate funding and disagreements in the design phase. The Indiana State Office Building Commission hired local firm Ratio Architects to design the building.

The Indiana State Museum building opened its doors to the public on May 22, 2002, with a ribbon cutting ceremony hosted by Governor Frank O’Bannon. This opening ceremony was attended by 600 school children from around the state and hundreds of other residents.

== Galleries ==
With more than 40,000 square feet (4,000 m^{2}) of exhibit space, the museum's galleries cover the history of the natural world, Native Americans, cultural history, and the future of Indiana. The museum largely devotes its space and energy equally between its three functions as a museum of art, culture, and science.

=== Gov. Frank O'Bannon Great Hall ===
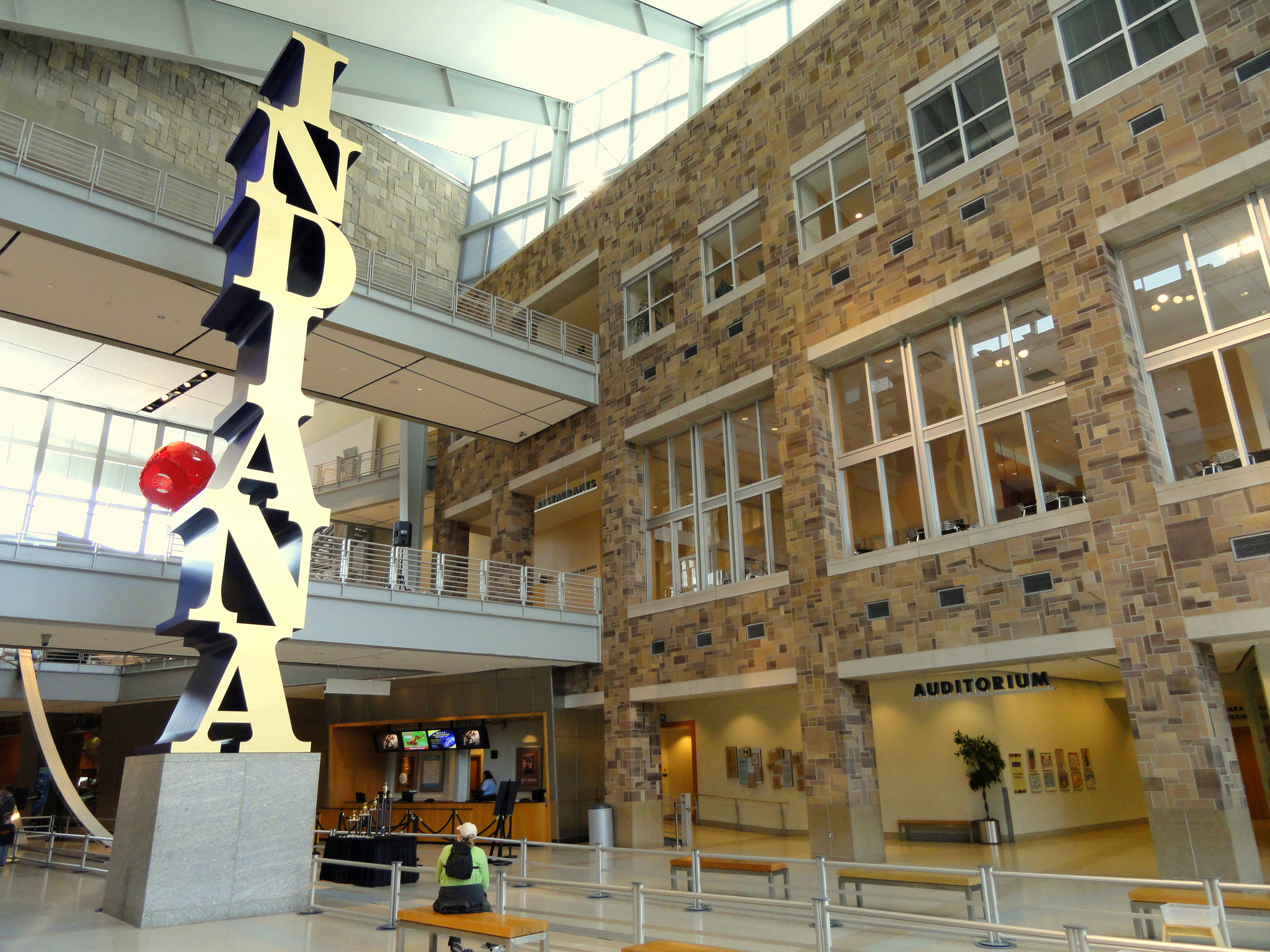
Gov. Frank O'Bannon Great Hall

- Dean and Barbara White Auditorium
- Legacy Theater: The Indiana African American Experience

=== First floor ===
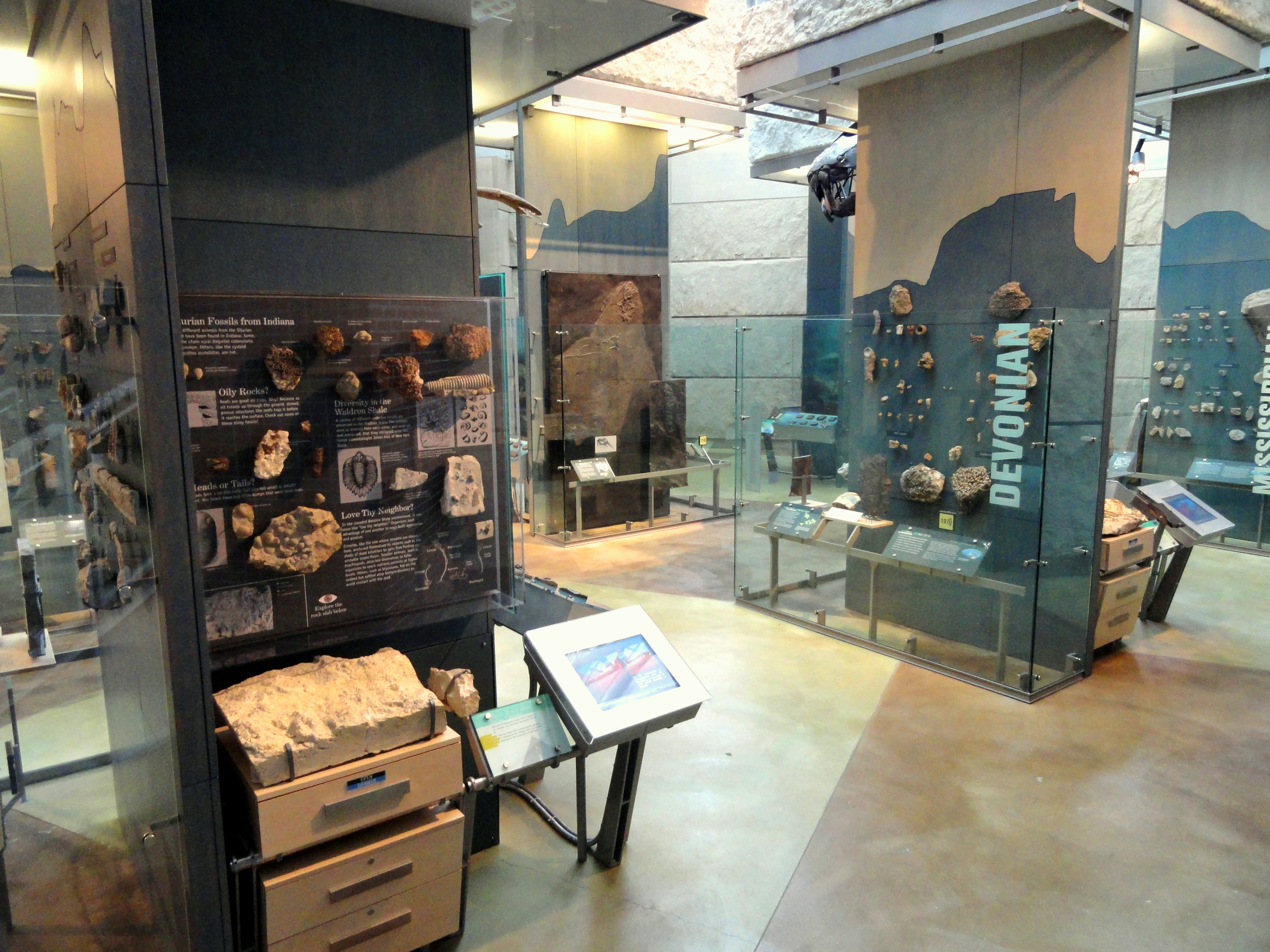
Ancient Seas Gallery

- Gallery One
- Ancient Seas
- R.B. Annis Naturalist's Lab
- Frozen Reign
- First Nations
- Natural Regions

=== Second floor ===
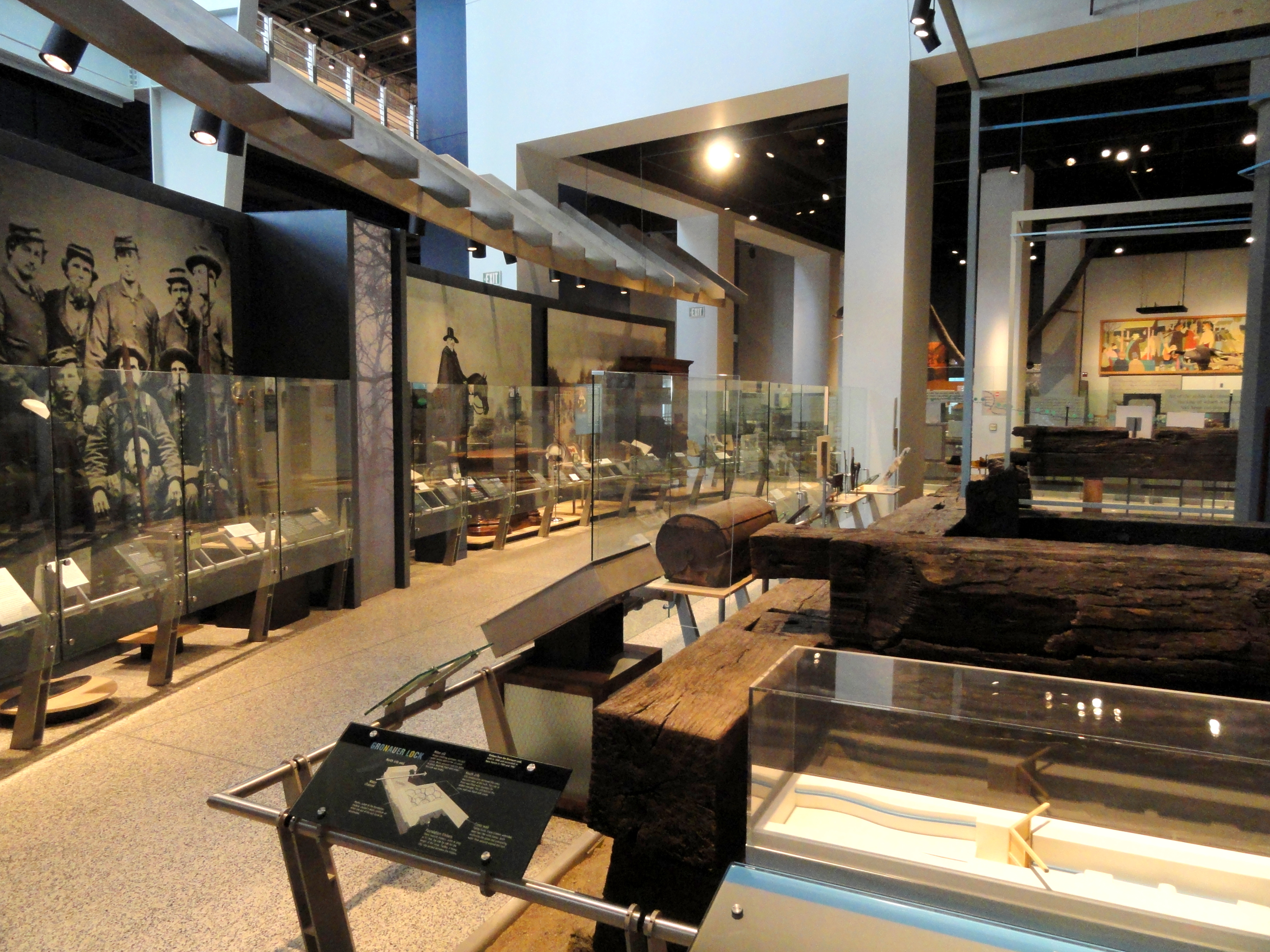
The Hoosier Way Gallery

- Contested Territory
- 19th State
- The Hoosier Way
- Crossroads of America
- Enterprise Indiana
- Global Indiana
- American Originals
- Firefly Landing

=== Third floor ===
- Rapp Reception Hall
- The Ford Gallery
- NiSource Gallery
- South Gallery
- Thomas A. King Bridge
- Lincoln Financial Foundation Gallery

=== Exhibit Design ===
During the thematic development and design of the building in 1998, Ralph Appelbaum Associates were brought in to develop the three level concept of exhibit space. Ralph Appelbaum Associates and museum staff came to the consensus that the museum's three distinct missions, art, culture, and science, must be represented dynamically. Appelbaum's core concept for the division of Indiana's story would evolve as visitors traveled upward through the museums three floors. Thus, the ground floor would host the ancient prehistory and natural history story, the second floor would tell the story of the material culture, industrial and cultural history, of the things made in Indiana and who made them, and the third floor would host the art galleries featuring Indiana's art and artists on a rotation.

=== 92 County Walk ===
The 92 County Walk is an art experience incorporated into the building's façade that spotlights Indiana's 92 counties by featuring an original sculpture for each county. The sculptures, created by 32 different artists, are made of limestone, aluminum, glass, and other materials, and represent the uniqueness of each Indiana county.

=== L. S. Ayres Tea Room ===
The original Tea Room existed for nearly 90 years at the L. S. Ayres department store in downtown Indianapolis. When the Tea Room closed in 1990, the Ayres family and the museum discussed recreating the Tea Room in the new museum. Building planners designed a standalone space with authentic period furnishings and recreations on the museum's second floor complete with drapery and carpets recreated from samples saved when the Ayres store closed. The Tea Room opened with the rest of the new building in May 2002, and attracts thousands of visitors a year.

== Collections ==
The museum's collection consists of items relating to Indiana's history, arts, and natural sciences. The collection of more than 500,000 objects contains six focus areas, which the museum refers to as "Centers of Excellence." These areas are Ice Age paleontology, Abraham Lincoln, Indiana art and artists, quilts and textiles, Indiana industry, technology, and agriculture, and Indiana archaeology.

The Indiana State Museum, in conjunction with the State Historic Sites, care for and manage the most comprehensive collection of art from Indiana artists, ranking them among the largest state-owned art collections in the country.

The museum is also in charge of the care and maintenance of the Indiana Governors' Portraits Collection, which consists of oil portraits (and one pastel portrait) of almost all of the governors of Indiana. The Indiana State Museum is responsible for commissioning the painting of an oil portrait for each new governor and the inclusion of that painting into the permanent collection. Most of the portraits currently hang in government offices in the Indiana Statehouse.

== State Historic Sites ==
The museum is part of the Indiana State Museum and Historic Sites. This statewide institution maintains the museum and 11 state historic sites. Each site interprets the history of an important person, place, or event in Indiana's history.

=== Indiana State Historic Sites ===
Site name	Image	Nearest city	County	Description
Angel Mounds State Historic Site		Evansville	Vanderburgh and Warrick	Archaeological site with surviving major earthwork mounds that was constructed and inhabited by the Mississippian culture between 1000 and 1450CE. The site was later excavated by noted archaeologist Glenn A. Black.
Corydon Capitol State Historic Site		Corydon	Harrison	Historic district that includes Indiana's original state capitol, the first state office building, and Governor William Hendricks' Headquarters.
Culbertson Mansion State Historic Site		New Albany	Floyd	Second Empire-style mansion built by industrialist William S. Culbertson in 1867 at a cost of $120,000. It contains 25-rooms within 20,000 square feet (1,900 m2) and was completed in November 1869.
Gene Stratton-Porter State Historic Site		Rome City	Noble	Second home of naturalist and author Gene Stratton-Porter located along Sylvan Lake where she lived from 1914 to 1919 prior to relocating to California.
Lanier Mansion State Historic Site		Madison	Jefferson	Historic house museum situated along the Ohio River built by J.F.D. Lanier, a prominent banker, railroad financier, and co-founder of Winslow, Lanier & Co. The mansion was designed by noted architect Francis Costigan and completed in 1844.
Levi & Catharine Coffin State Historic Site		Fountain City	Wayne	Home built by abolitionists Catharine and Levi Coffin in 1838–1839, later known as the "Grand Central Station of the Underground Railroad."
Limberlost State Historic Site		Geneva	Adams	Log cabin home built by Gene Stratton-Porter and her husband Charles Porter in 1895 that derives its name from its location near the Limberlost Swamp, which served as inspiration for many of Stratton-Porter's novels.
New Harmony State Historic Site		New Harmony	Posey	District in the historic town of New Harmony founded by the Harmony Society, including buildings such as the Mattias Scholle House. Later inhabited by Robert Owen and his Owenites.
T. C. Steele State Historic Site		Nashville	Brown	Picturesque property containing the home and studio of Hoosier Group artist Theodore Clement Steele and his second wife, Selma Neubacher Steele, as well as formal gardens and other natural features.
Vincennes State Historic Sites		Vincennes	Knox	Vincennes is Indiana's oldest city and original territorial capital. This district contains many early important buildings including the Indiana Territorial Capitol, Old State Bank, and Brouillet House.
Whitewater Canal State Historic Site		Metamora	Franklin	Part of the Whitewater Canal that spanned 76 miles from Lawrenceburg, Indiana to Hagerstown, Indiana, this site contains the Duck Creek Aqueduct in Metamora, which is the only remaining wooden aqueduct in the United States.

== See also ==
- List of U.S. state historical societies and museums
- List of attractions and events in Indianapolis
- Indiana Register of Historic Sites and Structures
- Indiana Steam Clock
