= Mansion Row Historic District =

Historic district in Indiana, United States

- U.S. National Register of Historic Places
- U.S. Historic district
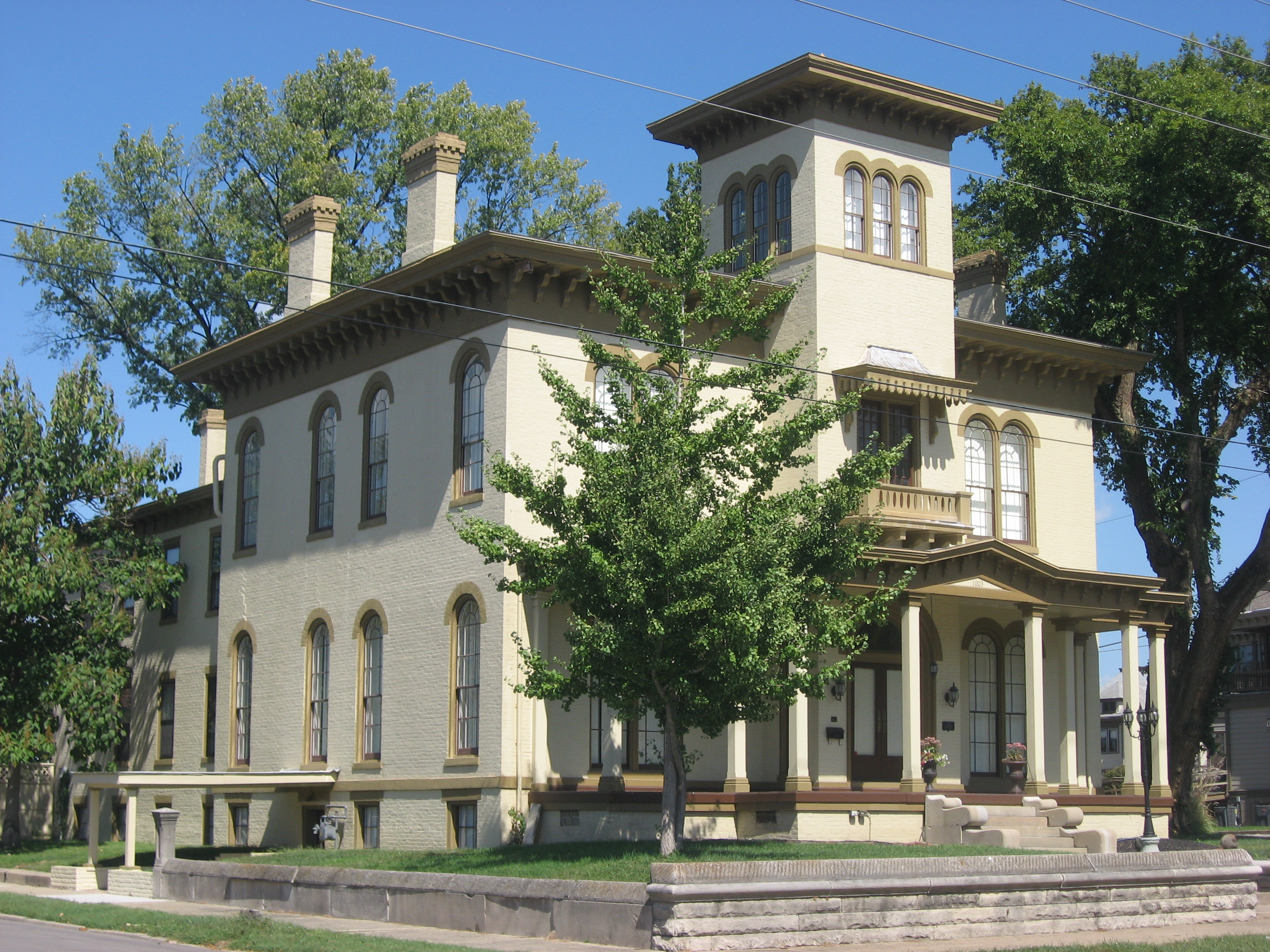
- Victor Pepin House

- Location within Indiana Location within the United States
- Location: Main St. between State and 15th Sts. and Market St. between 7th and 11th Sts., New Albany, Indiana
- Coordinates: 38°17′12″N 85°48′48″W
- Area: 89 acres (36 ha)
- Built: 1814
- Architect: Multiple
- Architectural style: Greek Revival, Federal, Italianate
- NRHP reference No.: 83000123
- Added to NRHP: May 9, 1983

The Mansion Row Historic District is a national historic district located at New Albany, Indiana. It features some of the various mansions of the city when New Albany was the largest city in Indiana around the time of the American Civil War. The main section is on Main Street from State Street (where the Scribner House is), to 15th Street. A smaller section is on Market Street from E. 7th Street to E. 11th Street.

Most of the buildings are of the Federal and Italianate styles, but other styles of the mansions are of Greek Revival, Gothic Revival, and Victorian. Most of the oldest of the buildings are of the Federal style, built before Upper High Street was renamed East Main Street.

It was listed on the National Register of Historic Places in 1983.

== Notable residents ==
- Asahel Clapp (physician)
- William Culbertson (merchant)
- Washington C. DePauw (industrialist)
- Michael C. Kerr (U.S. Speaker of the House)
- William Vaughn Moody (playwright)

== Prominent buildings ==
- Dr. Asahel Clapp House (1822), first brick house in New Albany
- State Bank of Indiana building (1837, Greek Revival) Built at the cost of $40,000, it was the tallest building in New Albany for a time. It was one of the ten original branches of Indiana's State Bank.
- Isaac P. Smith House (1847, Greek Revival)
- Victor Pepin House (1851, Tuscan Italianate Villa), fully restored now "The Pepin Mansion" an Event & Retreat venue, original painted ceilings and more.
- Sloan-Bicknell-Paris House (1851, Italian Villa), now the Admiral Bicknell Inn, it features a mahogany staircase with a cherry balustrade.
- Culbertson Mansion State Historic Site (1869, Second Empire)
- Washington C. DePauw House (1873, Second Empire) was the millionaire's winter home
- Culbertson Old Ladies' Home (1873), built by William Culbertson for the benefit of poor widows, it is currently a bed and breakfast, the Mansion at River Walk.
- Samuel Culbertson House (1887, Queen Anne), built as a wedding present from William Culbertson to his son, it now holds gatherings such as weddings and class reunions.
- St. Paul's Episcopalian Church (1896, Gothic Revival)
- New Albany Masonic Hall (1868 in the Italianate style)
- John H. and Evan B. Stotsenburg House (1867, Italianate style), 1407 E. Main.

== Gallery ==
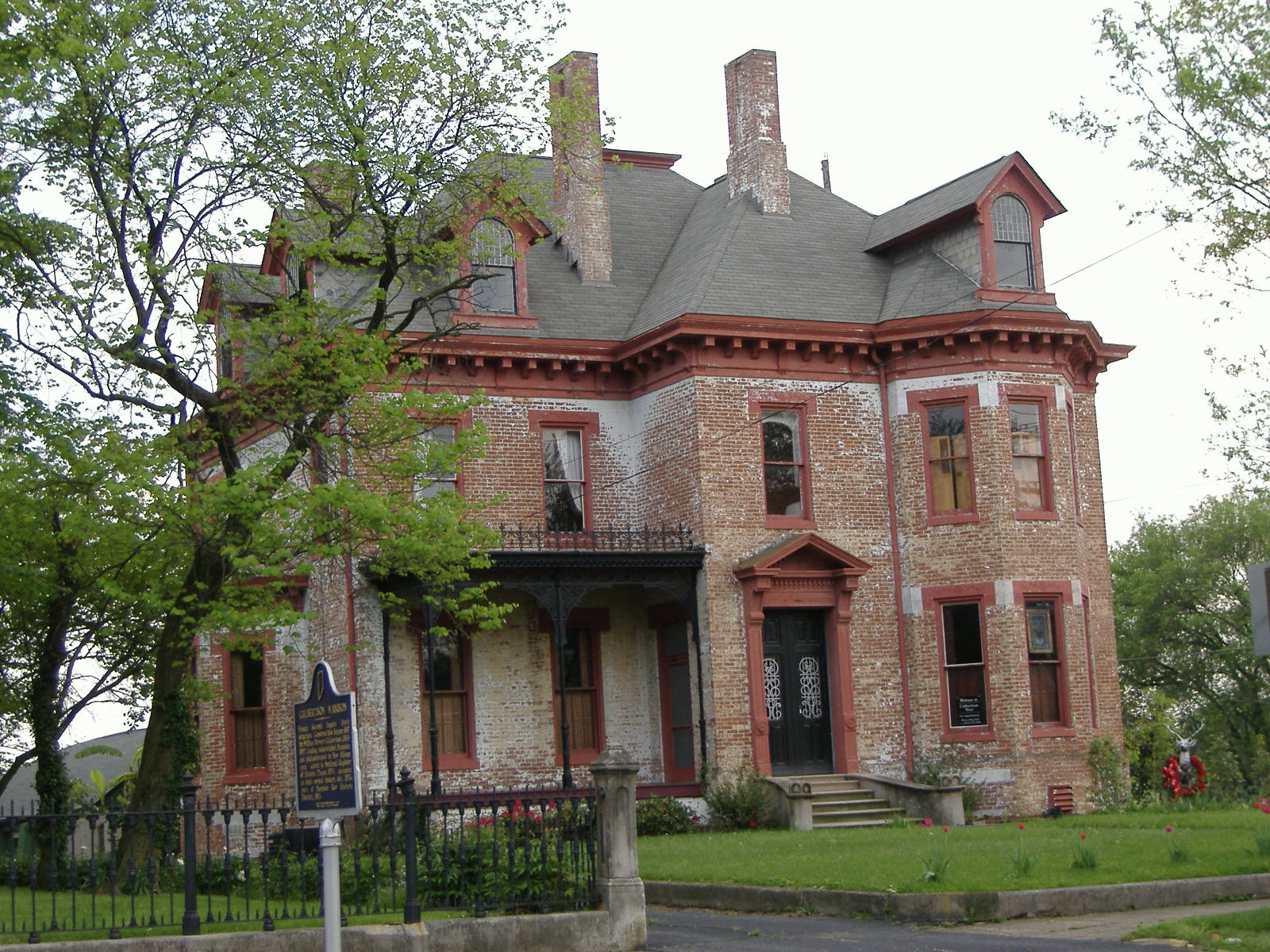
Samuel Culbertson House

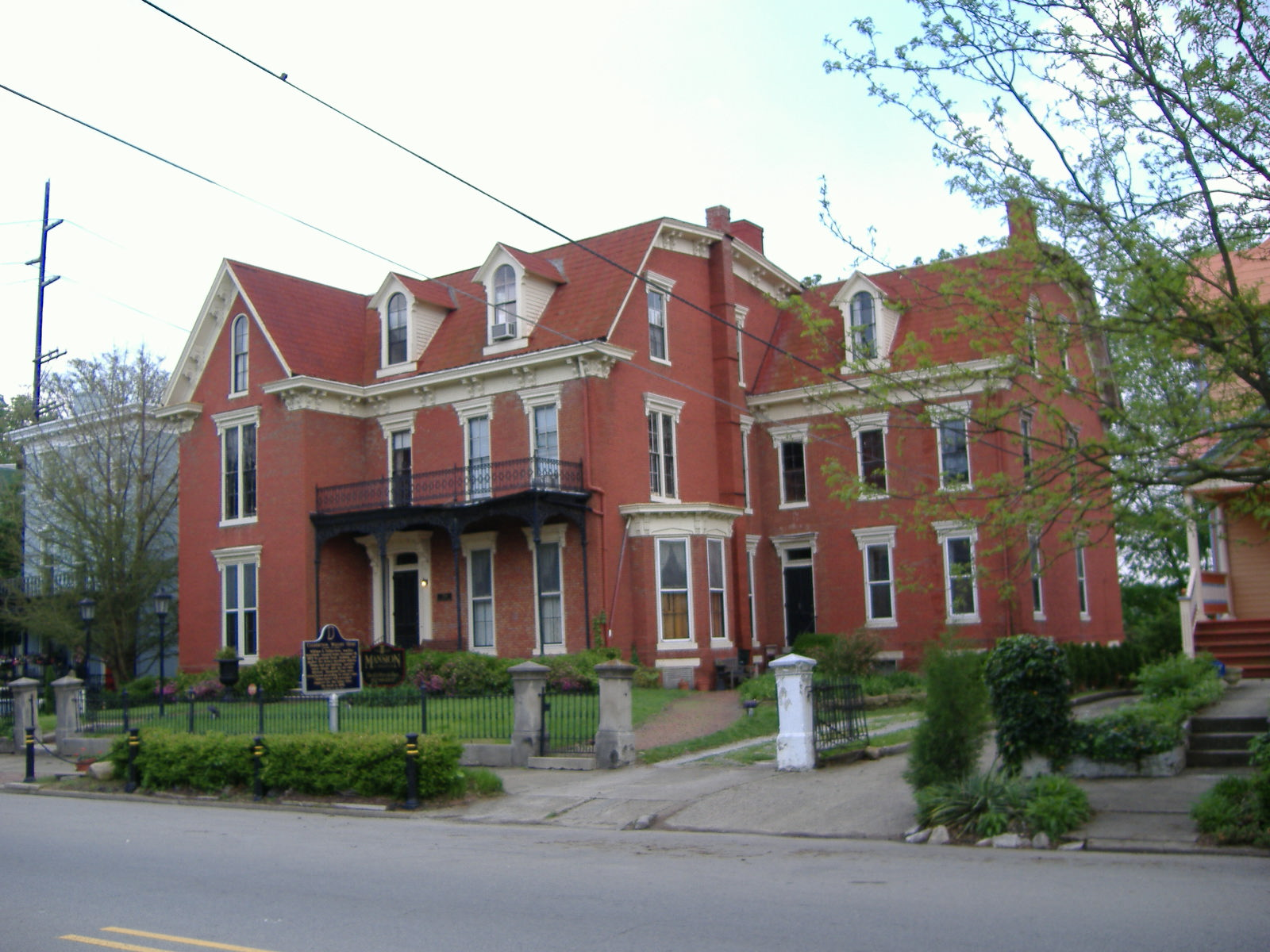
Culbertson Old Ladies' Home

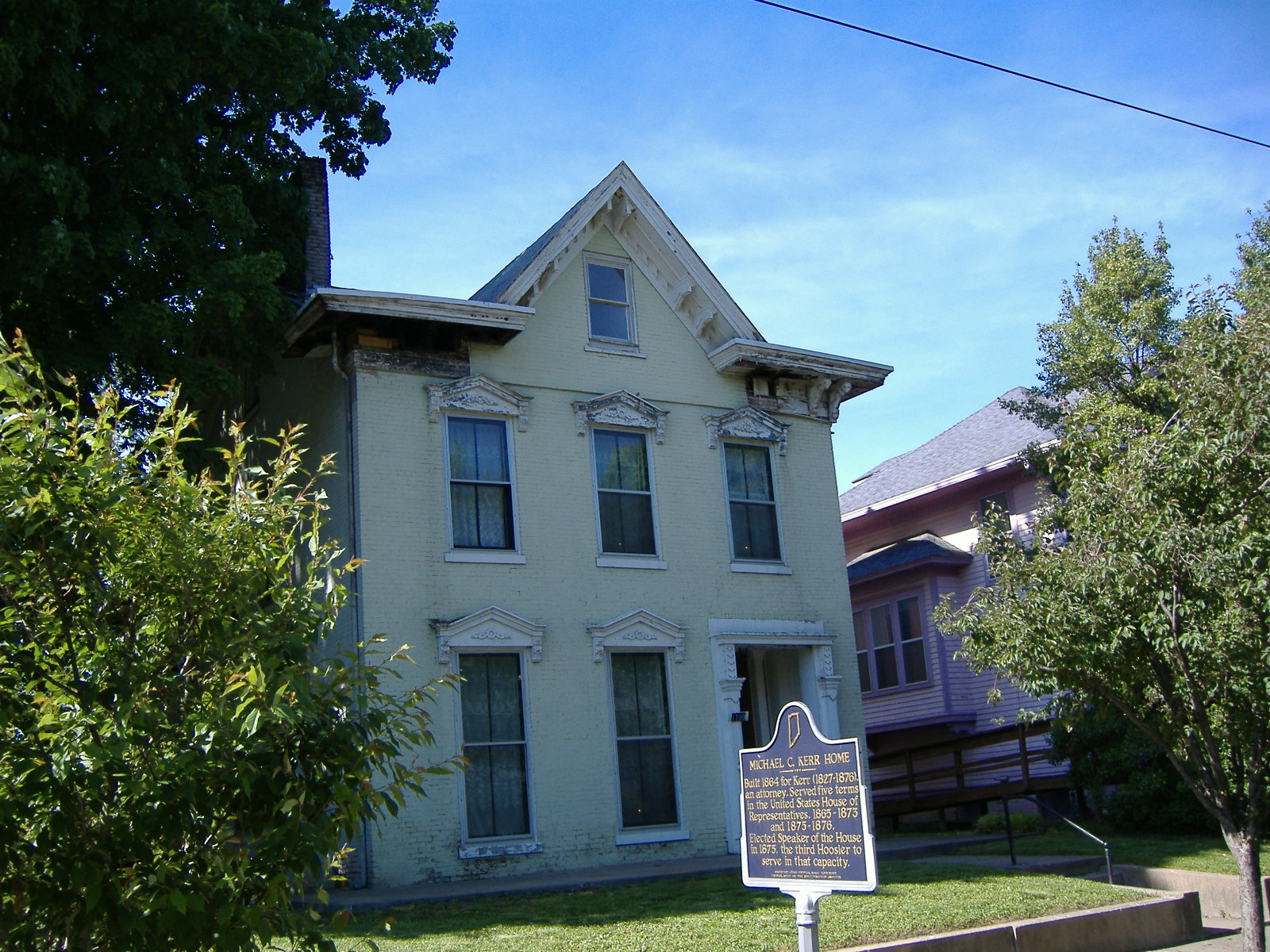
Home of Michael C. Kerr

== See also ==
- Cedar Bough Place Historic District
- East Spring Street Historic District
- New Albany Downtown Historic District
- List of attractions and events in the Louisville metropolitan area
