= East Spring Street Historic District =

Historic district in Indiana, United States

- U.S. National Register of Historic Places
- U.S. Historic district
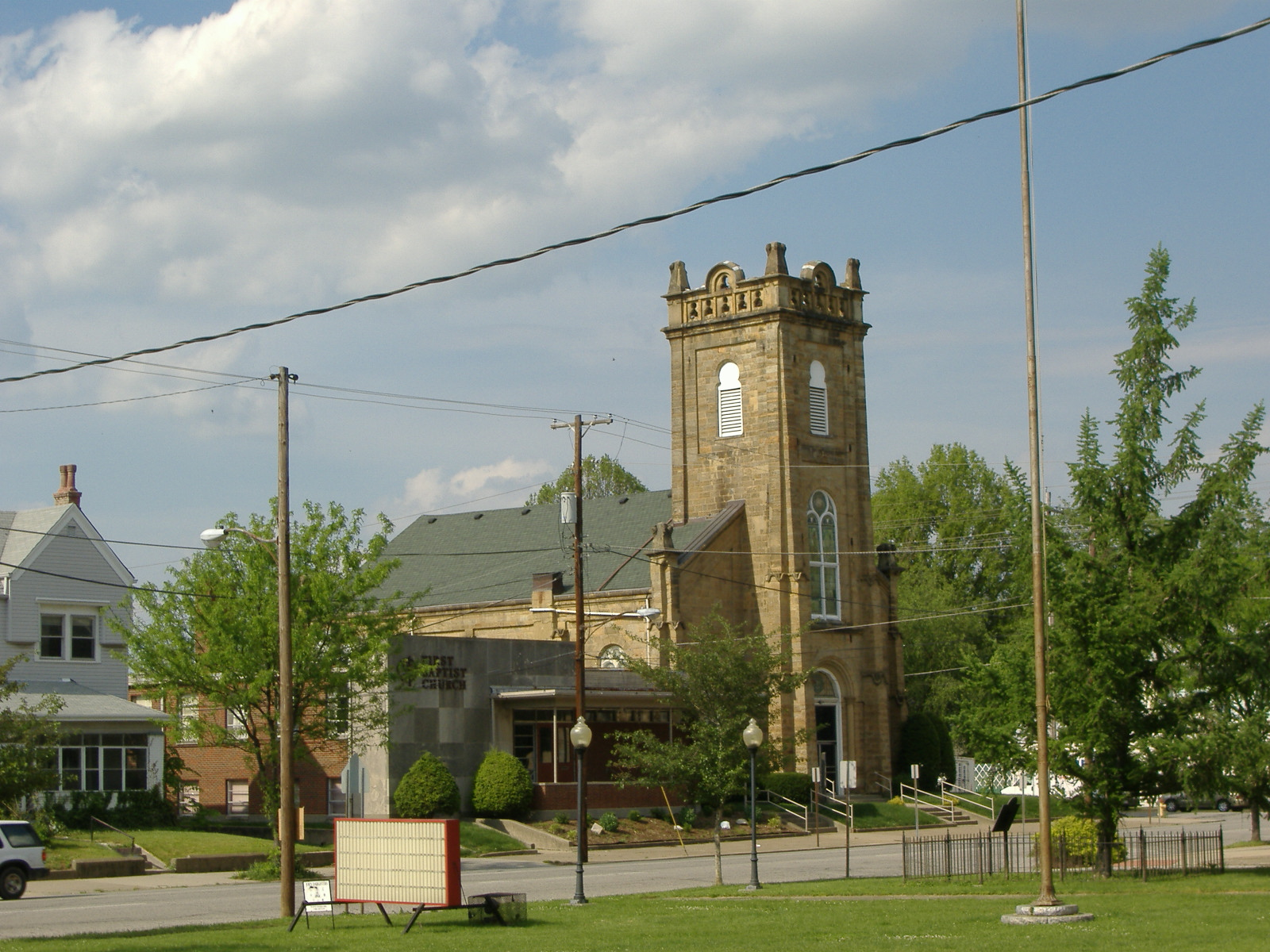
- First Baptist Church

- Location within Indiana Location within the United States
- Location: Roughly bounded by E. 5th, E. Spring, E. 8th, and E. Market Sts.; also roughly bounded by alley north/northwest of Elm St., the west curb line of Vincennes St., alley south/southwest of Market St., and the east curb line of 5th St., New Albany, Indiana
- Coordinates: 38°17′18″N 85°48′57″W
- Area: 32 acres (13 ha)
- Architect: Riedinger, Ludwig
- Architectural style: Queen Anne, Italianate, et al.
- NRHP reference No.: 02001566 (original); 100005877 (increase)

Significant dates
- Added to NRHP: December 19, 2002
- Boundary increase: December 2, 2020

The East Spring Street Historic District is a national historic district located at New Albany, Indiana. The general area is E. Fifth Street to the west, Spring St. to the north, E. Eighth Street to the east, and Market Street to the south. The Cedar Bough Place Historic District is one block north of the area, the New Albany Downtown Historic District is immediately west of the area, and the Market Street section of the Mansion Row Historic District starts. The district encompasses 84 contributing buildings in a largely residential section of New Albany. It developed in the late-19th and early-20th century and includes notable examples of Queen Anne and Italianate style architecture. Notable buildings include the Third Presbyterian Church (now First Baptist Church, 1853, 1955), St. Mary's Roman Catholic Church and Rectory (1858, 1886), the former John Conner House or Masonic Lodge (c. 1850), and Edwards City Hospital (c. 1890).

It was listed on the National Register of Historic Places in 2001, with a boundary increase in 2020.

In its prime, it was a haven for those of middle-class and upper-class social status. Many churches are within the area.

== Gallery ==
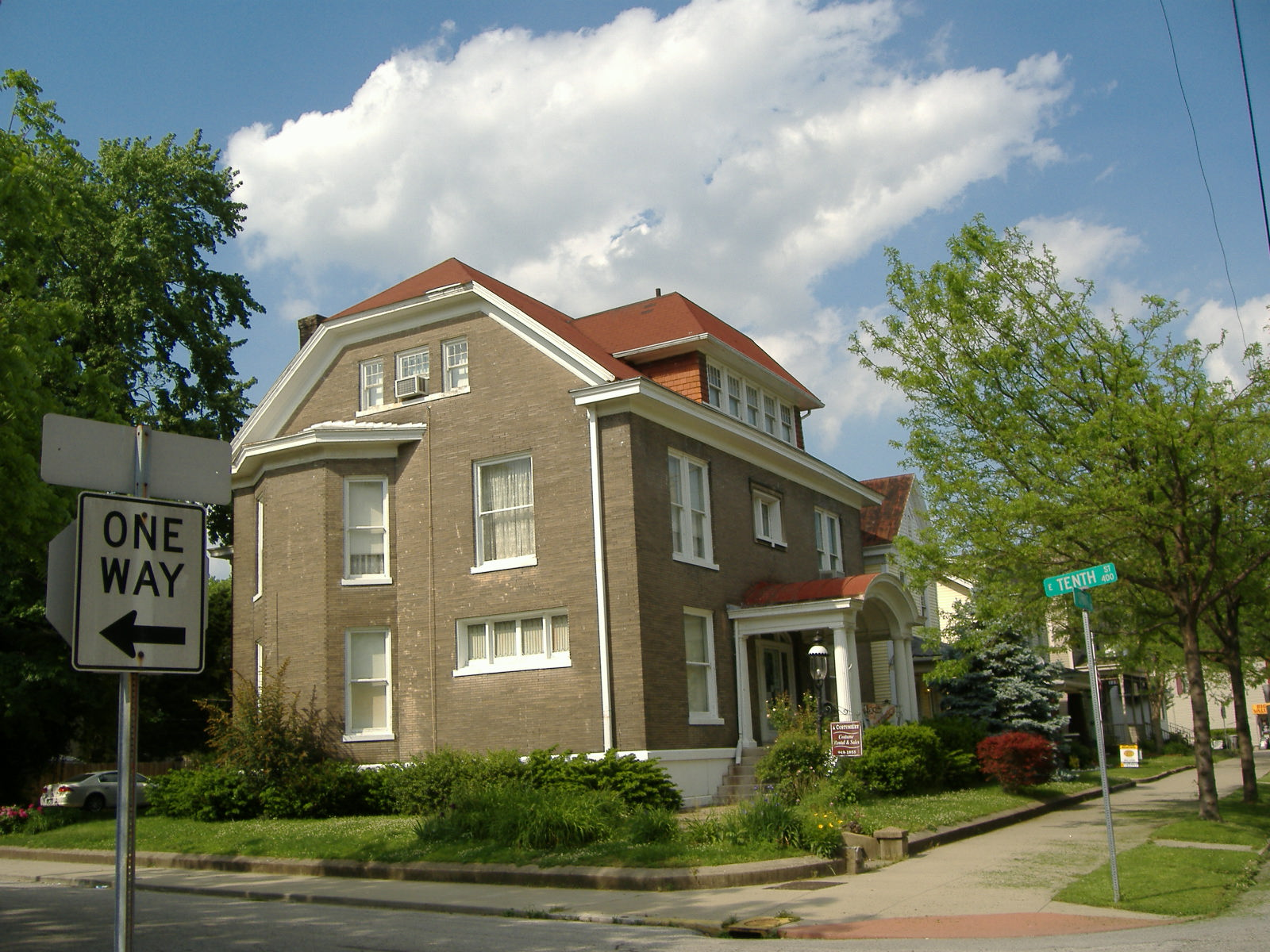
Colonial Revival home

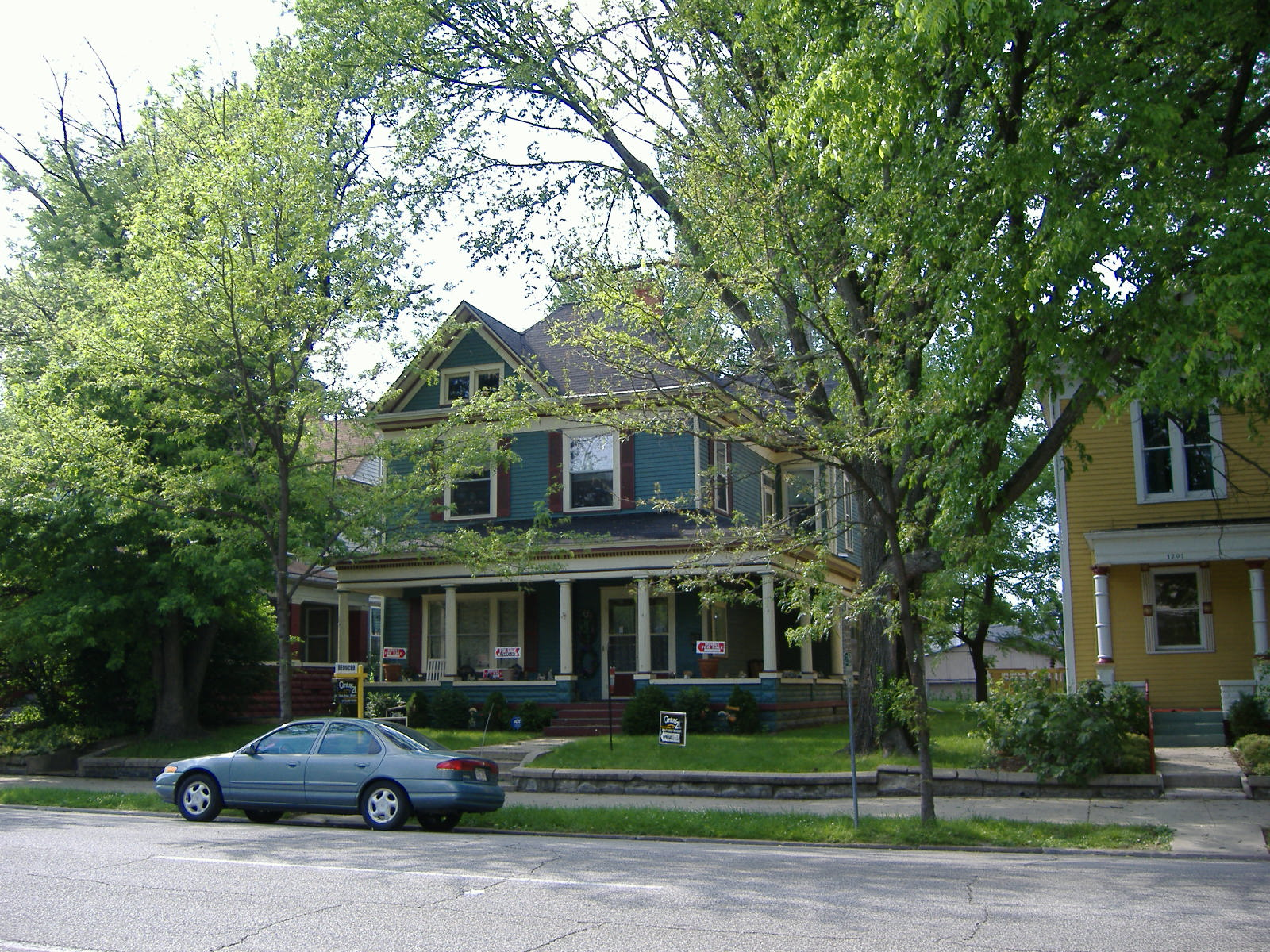
Queen-Anne home

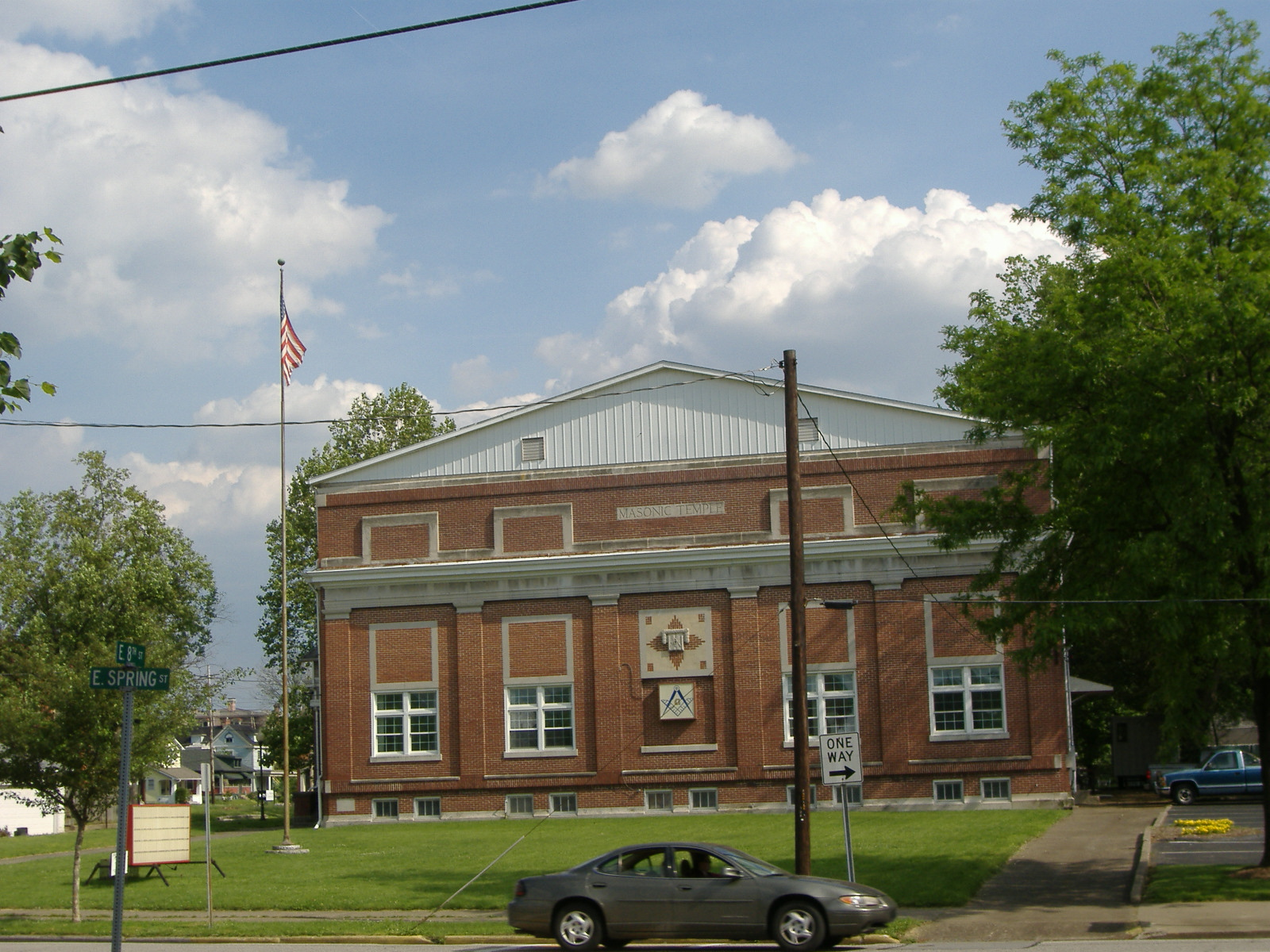
New Albany Masonic Temple
