= John Inshaw =

English mechanic and inventor (1807–1893)

John Inshaw (1807–1893) was a mechanic and inventor who lived in Aston, now a district of Birmingham, England. Inshaw designed and built machinery for the railway and shipping industries and constructed a steam carriage. He was consulted by George Stephenson on the design of wheels for steam locomotives. From 1859 to 1886, Inshaw operated the Steam Clock Tavern on Morville Street in which he exhibited working models and examples of his mechanical devices. It was named after the most notable, although perhaps least practical, of his inventions.

Showell's Dictionary of Birmingham credits Inshaw with introducing "Baby Shows" to Birmingham from the USA in 1874.

== Inshaw Steam Carriage ==
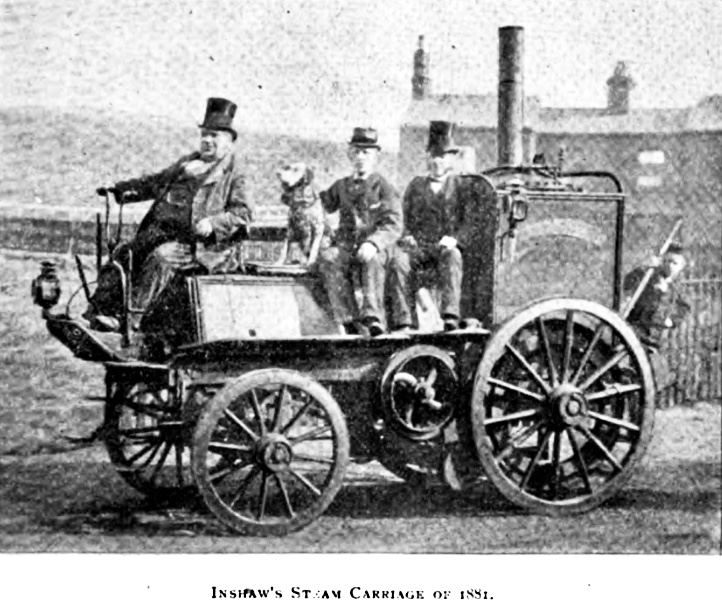
Inshaw Steam Carriage (1881)

John Inshaw built a steam carriage in 1881. It had a water-tube boiler, working at 200 psi, and steam could be raised in 20 minutes. The engine had two cylinders of 4in bore by 8in stroke, three gears and double-gear drive to the rear wheels. When loaded with ten passengers it weighed 35 cwt and averaged 8–12 mph.

Inshaw wrote about his machine in The Engineer magazine, published 1 November 1895. He claimed that he discontinued his experiments because of the law prohibiting the use of steam-propelled carriages and that he hoped to build a second one as soon as the law was repealed. A photograph of the carriage was printed in an American book, in 1904: "English & American Steam Carriages and Traction Engines". The author, William Fletcher, noted that the Inshaw Steam Carriage "was well known in Birmingham and district".

== See also ==
- Steam clock
