= Water Street (Vancouver) =

Street in Vancouver, British Columbia, Canada

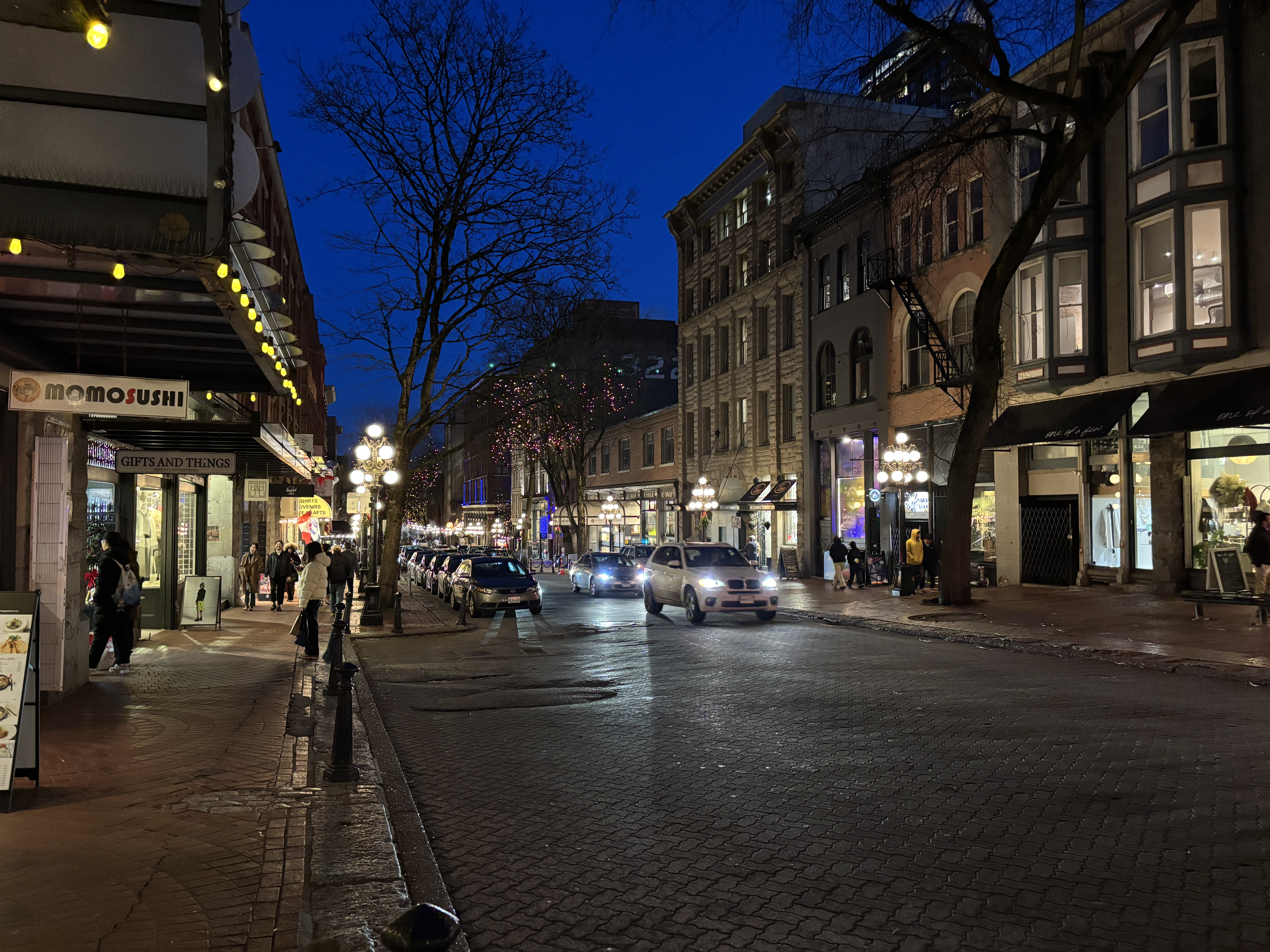
Water Street in evening

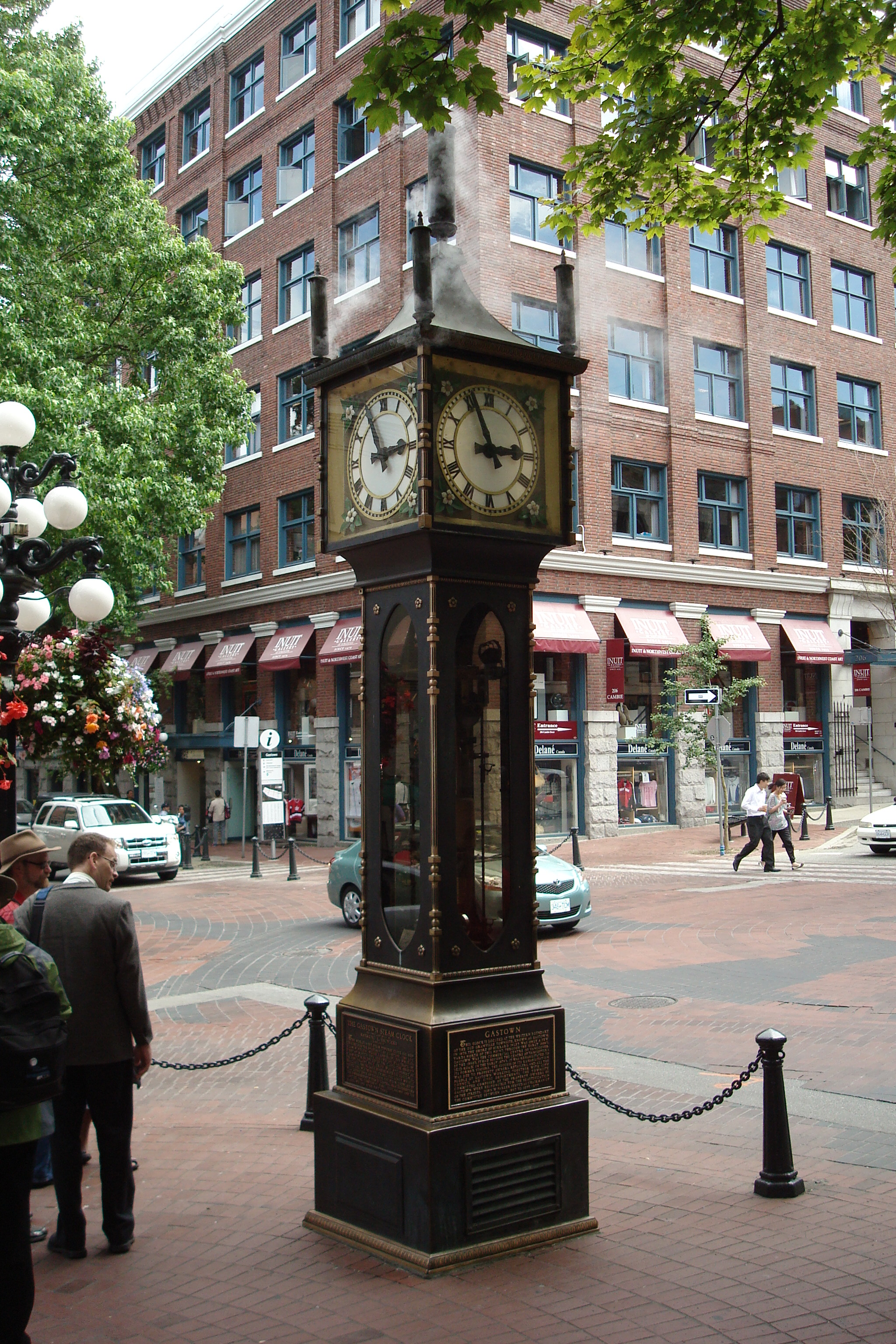
Gastown steam clock

Water Street is a street in the Gastown area of Vancouver, British Columbia. It is named for its proximity to the water, in this case the south shore of Burrard Inlet, and was briefly known as Front Street. Water Street is popular amongst tourists; its most famous landmark is the steam clock.

== History ==
In the early to mid 20th century, Water Street was the center of Vancouver's food, clothing and dry goods wholesale businesses. Due to Vancouver being the main port of western Canada, much of the trading of goods from east Asia went through Water Street. Water Street also housed the British and American firms that provided heavy equipment for the coastal and interior logging operations.

In the 1960s, due to limited space and rising real estate costs, the wholesale business left Water Street and gentrification occurred afterwards with shops, restaurants, offices and galleries opening on the street.
