= Raymond Saunders (clockmaker) =

Canadian clockmaker (1940–2024)

Ray Saunders
- Saunders in 1978
- Born: Raymond Lee Saunders; February 7, 1940; Courtenay, British Columbia, Canada
- Died: November 23, 2024 (aged 84); Vancouver, British Columbia, Canada
- Occupations: Clockmaker; horologist
- Known for: Designing and building the Gastown steam clock

Raymond Lee Saunders (February 7, 1940 – November 23, 2024) was a Canadian clockmaker who designed and built more than 150 customized clocks that have mainly served as tourist-attracting public artworks. He is best known for constructing the Gastown steam clock in Vancouver, which he completed in 1977. Saunders also built six other public steam clocks for clients including the city of Otaru, Japan (1994), and the Indiana State Museum (2002).

In 2019, Saunders was badly injured in a fall and became semi-retired, though he continued to train other clockmakers and work on smaller projects. He died on November 23, 2024, at the age of 84; at the time of his death, he had been working on a proposal for a new clock by the historic Drake Street Roundhouse in Yaletown. He was survived by five children.

== See also ==
- Steam clock
