= Culbertson Mansion State Historic Site =

- Culbertson Mansion
- U.S. National Register of Historic Places
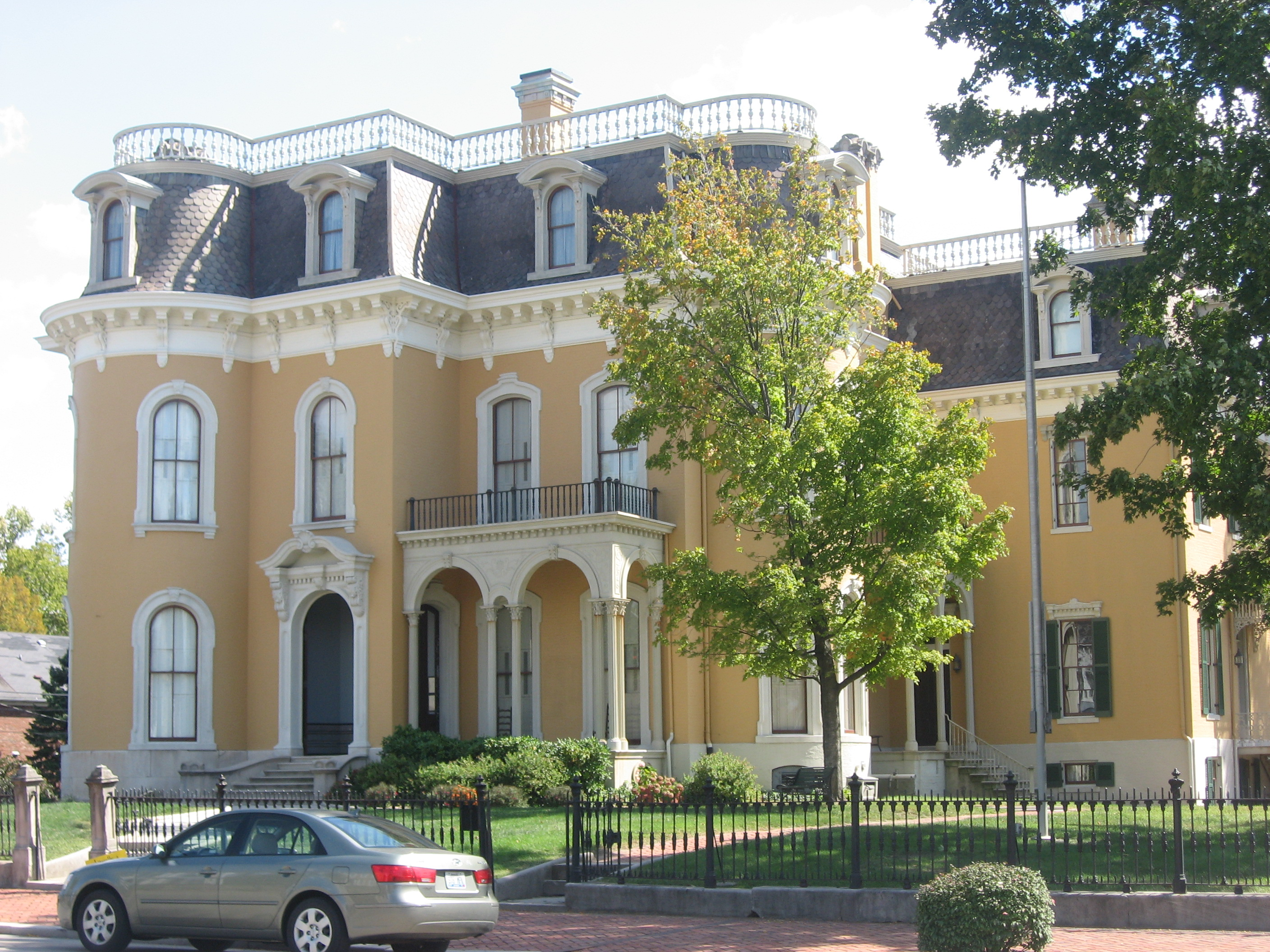

- Location within Indiana Location within the United States
- Location: 914 E. Main St., New Albany, Indiana
- Coordinates: 38°17′11″N 85°48′46″W
- Area: 1 acre (0.40 ha)
- Architectural style: Second Empire
- NRHP reference No.: 74000019
- Added to NRHP: June 28, 1974

Culbertson Mansion State Historic Site is located in New Albany, Indiana by the Ohio River. It was the home of William Culbertson, who was once the richest man in Indiana. Built in 1867 at a cost of $120,000, this Second Empire-style mansion has 25-rooms within 20,000 square feet (1,900 m^{2}), and was completed in November 1869. It was designed by James T. Banes, a local architect. Features within the three-story edifice include hand-painted ceilings and walls, frescoed ceilings, carved rosewood-grained staircase, hand painted floors, wall-to-wall carpeting, marble fireplaces, wallpaper of fabric-quality, and crystal chandeliers. The original tin roof was imported from Scotland. The displays within the mansion feature the Culbertson family and the restoration of the building. The rooms on the tour are the formal parlors, dining rooms, bedrooms, kitchen, and laundry room.

In its heyday, a railroad ran behind the house (Culbertson had sold land to the railroad), and a streetcar ran from his house towards downtown New Albany.

== History ==
After Culbertson's death, he willed the home to his third wife, who auctioned off the house and contents in 1899 to John McDonald, also a resident of New Albany, for $7,100. Upon his death, the American Legion obtained it from McDonald's daughter, Mrs. Helen Croxall. The Legion would make extensive changes to the mansion, making it more suitable for a meeting place.

After several different owners, the mansion was in danger of being torn down in the 1960s to put a gas station in its place. Instead, a local historic group called Historic New Albany purchased the mansion in 1964 from the American Legion for $24,000.00. It was listed on the National Register of Historic Places in 1974 and became a part of the Indiana State Museum and Historic Sites in 1976.

In 1980, the state began restoration on the exterior of the home, following by work on the interior by the Friends of the Culbertson Mansion.

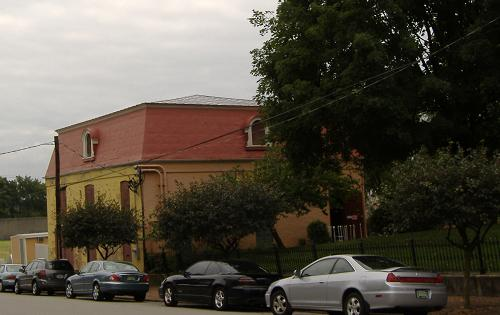
The Carriage House

In 1985 the tradition of having a haunted house started, and for the first two years the Mansion itself was used, using 10 people to acquire $500 as part of a Spook Run. Starting in 1987, the Carriage House of the Mansion has served as the haunted house. Today, the Haunted House requires 100 volunteers.

The Culbertson Mansion performs historic restoration rather than renovation to protect the historical integrity of the home. The eventual goal is to return the mansion to its 1869 appearance, barring necessary newer items such as electricity and bathrooms.

It is open for daily tours, Wednesday through Sunday from 10 a.m. to 5 p.m. Funds for restoration are raised by a non-profit group called The Friends of Culbertson Mansion, Inc., as well as the staff of the mansion itself. The Friends not only operate the Haunted House, but hold an herb sale annually in May.

== Gallery ==
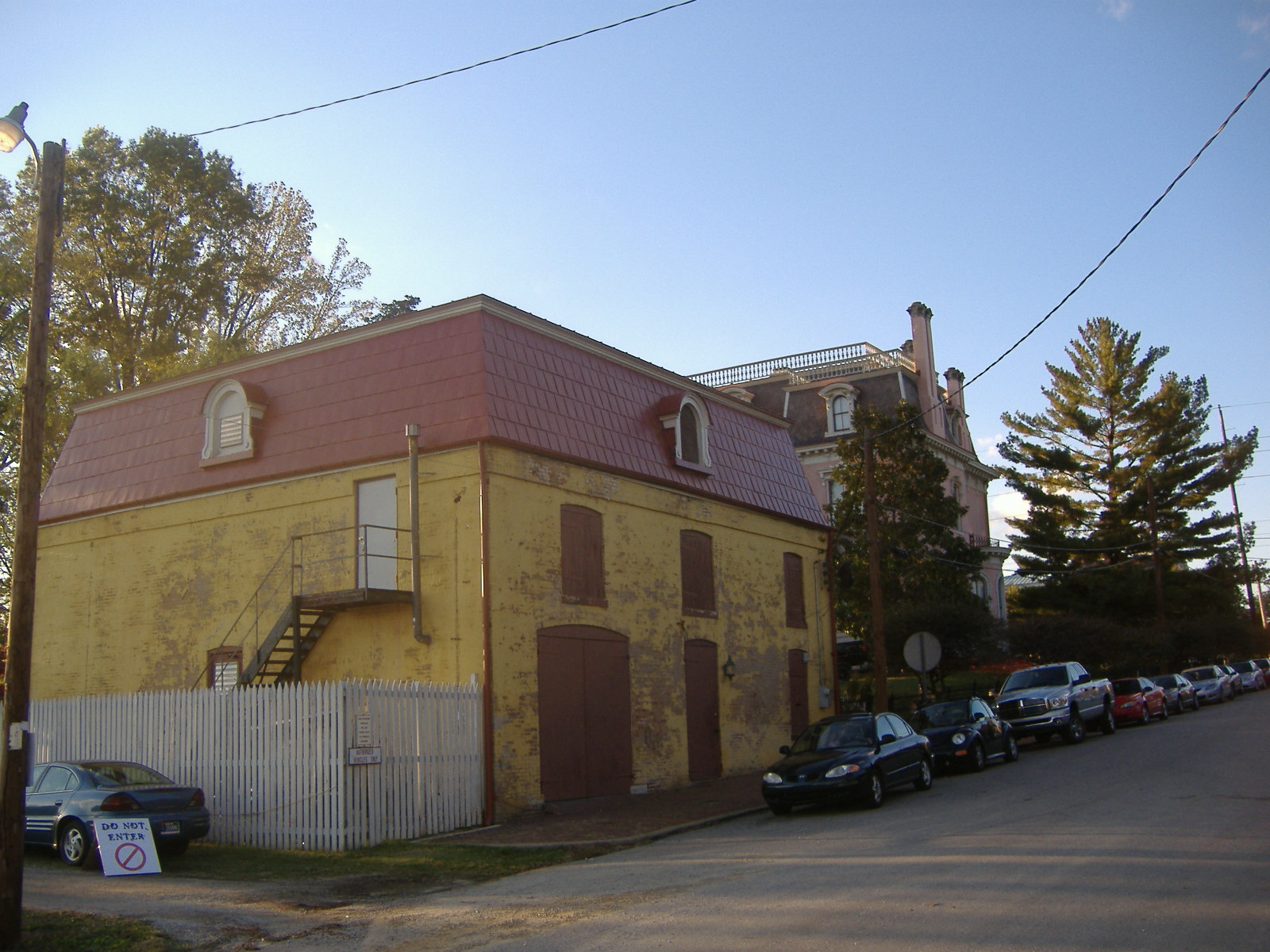
Carriage barn

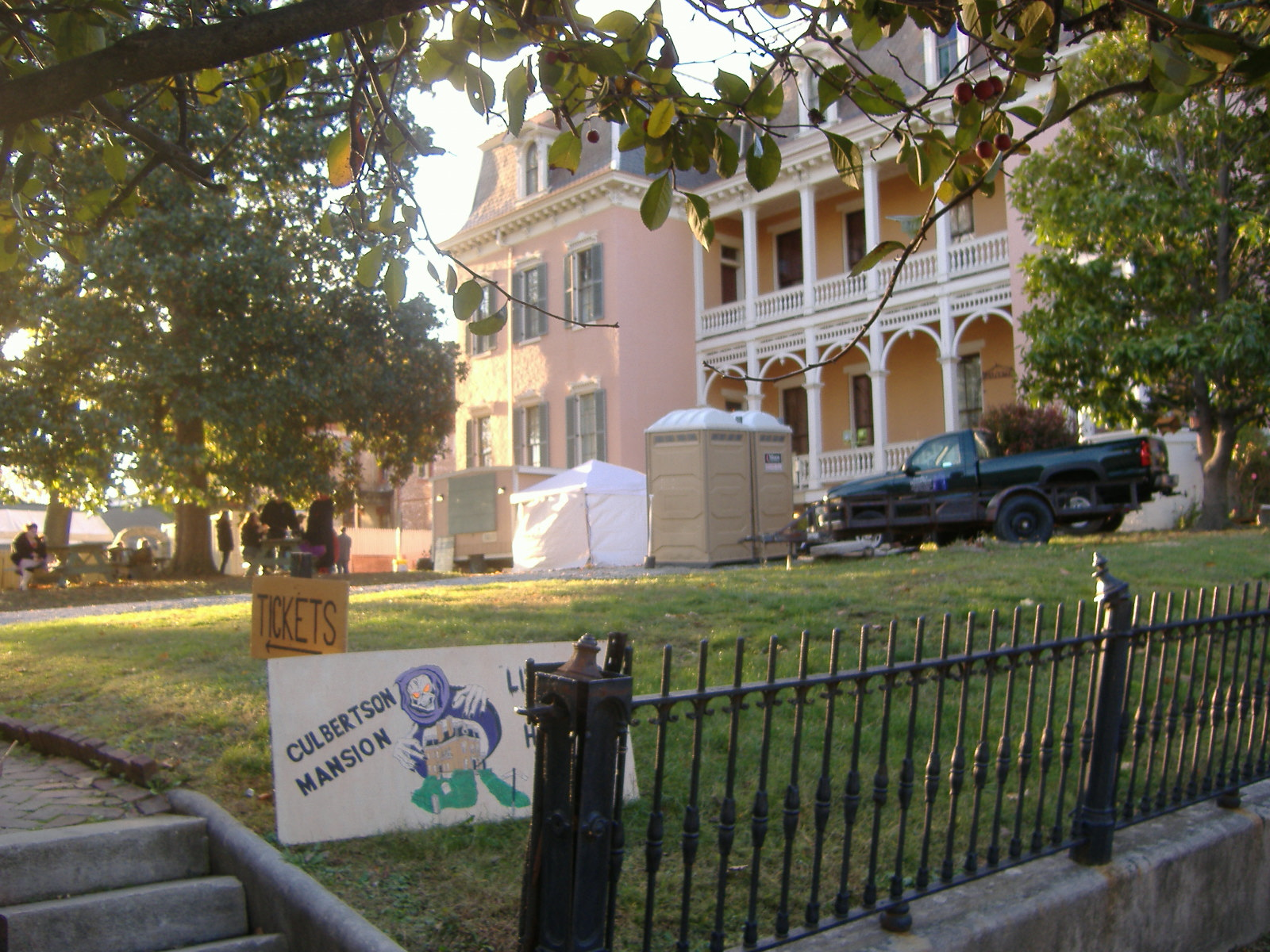
Back entrance to the Mansion

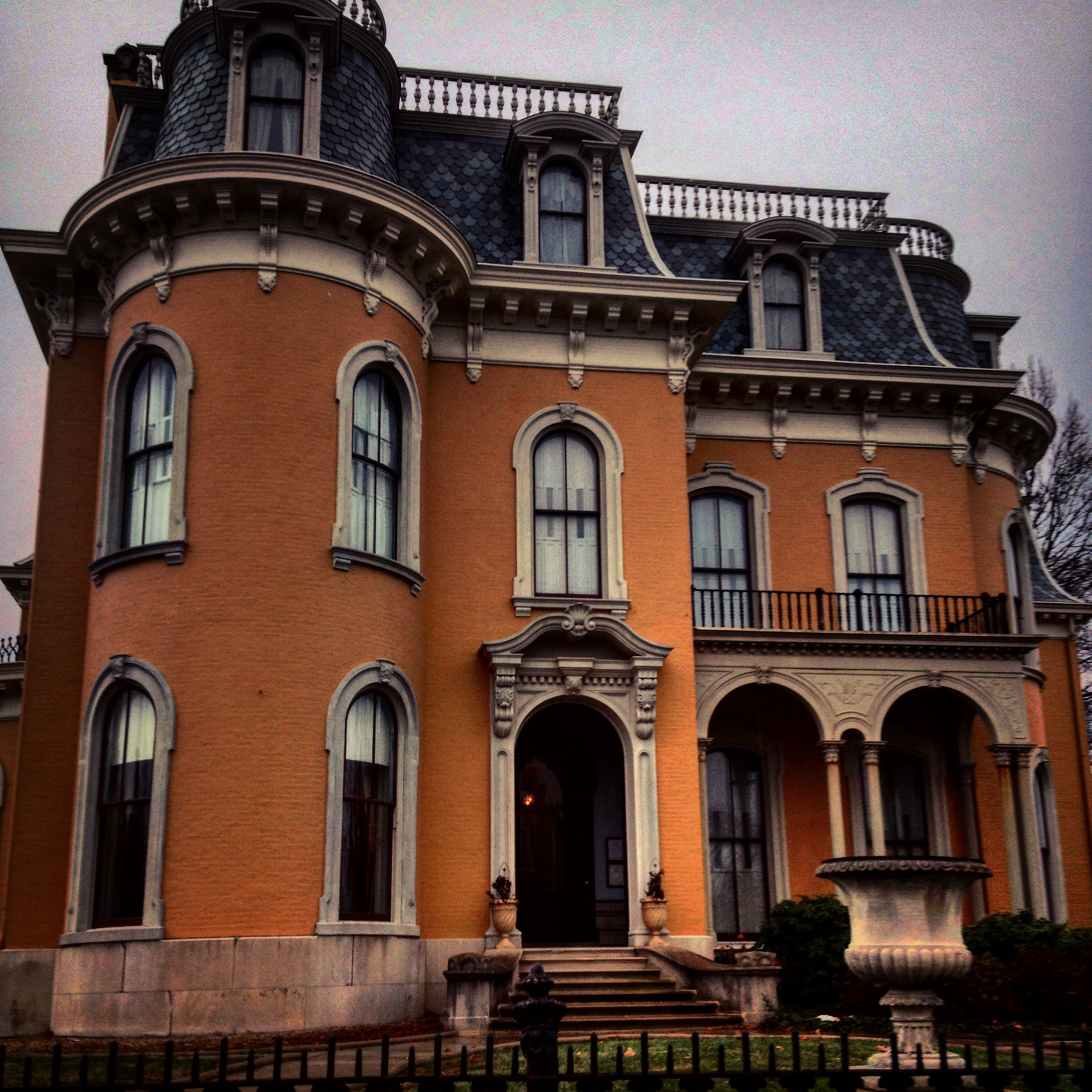
Culbertson Mansion

== See also ==
- List of attractions and events in the Louisville metropolitan area
- Mansion Row Historic District
- National Register of Historic Places listings in Floyd County, Indiana
