= William Culbertson (businessman) =

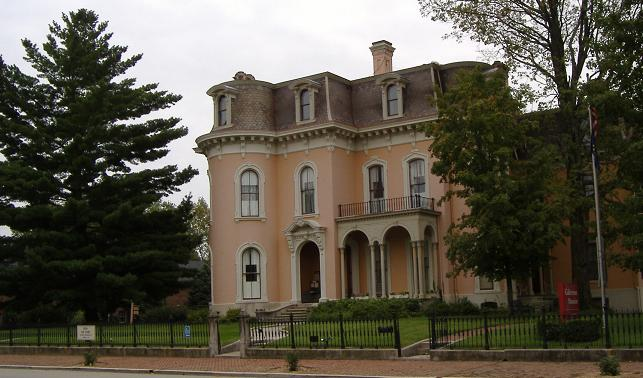
William S. Culbertson Mansion, 904 East Main Street, New Albany, Indiana

William Stuart Culbertson (1814–1892) was once the richest man in Indiana. Born in New Market, Pennsylvania, he migrated at age 21 to find his fortune along the Ohio River. He settled in New Albany, Indiana, taking a job as a dry goods clerk, but by 1860 had found his wealth in dry goods. In 1868 he retired from dry goods to become an investor. When he died in 1892, he was worth $3.5 million, leaving behind his third wife after two wives died before him. Culbertson Mansion State Historic Site in New Albany, Indiana, was his home.

== Early life ==
William Culbertson was born on February 4, 1814, in New Market, York County, Pennsylvania. He was the second of six children born to William Culbertson and Julia Stuart. William grew up learning the mercantile business, as his parents ran a successful one in New Market. At age 21, William left home to find work in Louisville, Kentucky but was turned away.

== Marriage and personal life ==
William Culbertson married his first wife Eliza Vance on February 19, 1840. They had eight children before her death from typhoid fever on January 3, 1865. William then married Cornelia Eggleston on January 10, 1867. They had two children before her death on October 18, 1880. He then married widow Rebecca Keith Spears Young.

Blanche Culbertson French, his daughter with his wife Cornelia, was the most notable among his children due to her involvement in the suffrage movement. She was President of the Equal Franchise League of New Rochelle, New York, and a member of the National Woman's Suffrage Association. His great-granddaughter was Rebekah Harkness, a socialite, philanthropist, and one of the richest women in America.

== Philanthropy ==
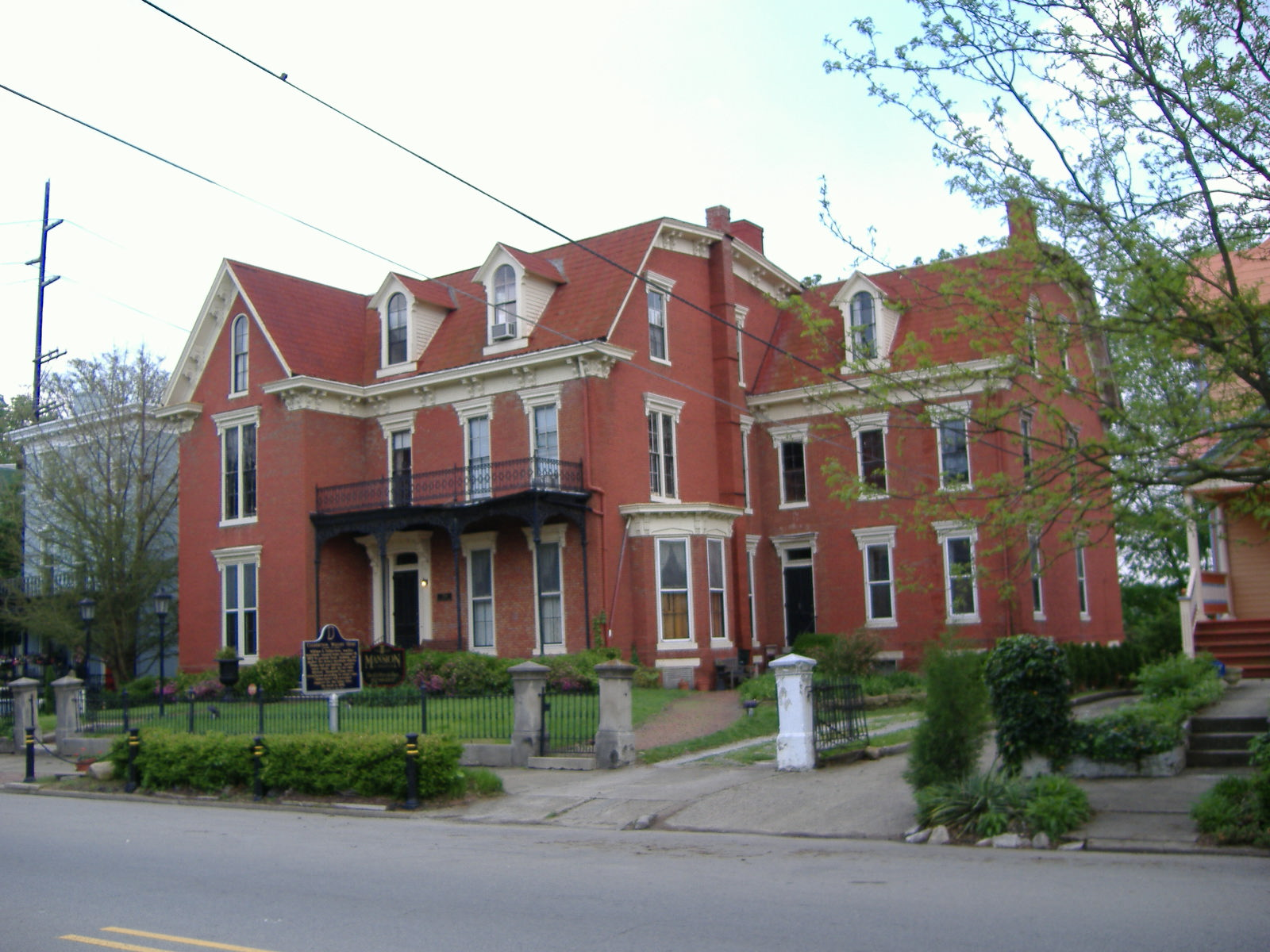
Culbertson Widow's Home, 704 East Main Street, New Albany, Indiana

Throughout his life, Culbertson assisted those less fortunate. As a utility company president he subsidized the city gas supply in order to provide heat to all residents, distributed meals to the hungry every day, and helped to combat water-borne disease as president of the water company.

In 1873, Culbertson organized the construction of the Culbertson Widows' Home. He had been led by the conditions in which the widows of the Civil War had found themselves. Culbertson paid $25,000 for its construction, and set up an endowment of $150,000 for its continued operation. The home closed in 1971.

In 1881, Culbertson gifted a large plot of land, as well as the construction of a large brick building to be used by the Orphans Home Society. His wife Cornelia had been the president of the association and died the previous year. The home was named in memory of Cornelia Culbertson.

== Later life and death ==
William S. Culbertson died on June 25, 1892, in New Albany, Indiana. He is buried in Fairview Cemetery in New Albany, Indiana.
