= Ballinger =

Ballinger may refer to:

== Places ==
- Ballinger, Buckinghamshire, UK
- Ballinger, Texas, US
- Lake Ballinger, Washington, US

== Other uses ==
- Ballinger (surname)
- Balinger or ballinger, a type of medieval sailing vessel
- The Ballinger Company, an architecture/engineering firm
- Ballinger High School, Ballinger, Texas
- Ballinger Bearcats, a 1920s West Texas League baseball team based in Ballinger, Texas
- Ballinger Cats, a Longhorn League baseball team based in Ballinger, Texas, that played from 1947 to 1950

== See also ==
- Pinchot–Ballinger controversy
- Ballenger
