= Bellinger =

Bellinger may refer to:

== Names ==
- Bellinger (given name), a masculine given name
- Bellinger (surname), a surname

== Places ==
- Bellinger, Wisconsin, an unincorporated community in Wisconsin, United States
- Bellinger River, a river in the Mid North Coast of New South Wales, Australia.

== See also ==
- Bellinger-Dutton
