= Ballenger =

Ballenger is a surname. Notable people with the surname include:

- A. F. Ballenger (1861–1921), Seventh-day Adventist Minister who started the "Receive Ye the Holy Ghost" movement
- Bill Ballenger (born 1941), American politician
- Cass Ballenger (1926–2015), American politician
- Frank Ballenger, American football coach in the United States
- Pelham Ballenger (1894–1948), Major League Baseball third baseman, for at least a week, with the Washington Senators in 1928
- Roger Ballenger, Oklahoma Senator from District 8, which includes McIntosh, Okfuskee, Okmulgee and Tulsa counties, since 2006
- William S. Ballenger Sr. (1866–1951), American businessman

== See also ==
- Ballenger Building in downtown Columbia, Missouri was listed by the National Register of Historic Places in 2004
- Ballenger Creek, tributary of the Monocacy River in Frederick County, Maryland
- Ballenger Creek, Maryland, census-designated place (CDP) in Frederick County, Maryland, United States
- Ballinger (disambiguation)
