= Bellinger (surname) =

Bellinger is a German surname, with popular variants such as Ballinger and Balinger. Notable people with the surname include:

- Bob Bellinger (1913–1955), American football player
- Charles B. Bellinger (1839–1905), American judge
- Clay Bellinger (born 1968), American baseball player
- Cody Bellinger (born 1995), American baseball player
- Daniel Bellinger (born 2000), American football player
- Eric Bellinger (born 1986), American singer, songwriter, and record producer
- Gene Bellinger (born 1948), American systems thinker
- Gerhard J. Bellinger (1931–2020), German theologian
- Jeff Bellinger (21st century), American creator of Killer Bunnies and the Quest for the Magic Carrot
- John B. Bellinger III (21st century), United States Senate lawyer
- Joseph Bellinger (1773–1830), American politician
- Katrin Bellinger (born 1958), London-based German art dealer
- Patrick N. L. Bellinger (1885–1962), American aviator
- Peter Bellinger (1726–1813), American militiaman
- Robert Bellinger (1910–2002), British politician
- Tony Bellinger (born 1957), American soccer coach
- Trudy Bellinger (21st century), British music video director
