= Charismatic Adventism =

Subtype of Adventist Protestantism

Charismatic Adventists are a segment of Adventism, specifically the Seventh-day Adventist Church, as well as some other Adventist denominations, such as the Adventist Church of Promise and the International Missionary Society of Seventh-Day Adventist Church Reform Movement, that is closely related to "Progressive Adventism", a liberal movement within the church.

== Beliefs ==
=== Music ===
Like progressive Adventists, charismatics are typically open to a variety of styles of worship music in church including Contemporary Christian Music.

=== Speaking in tongues ===
Adventists commonly believe that speaking in tongues refers to speaking in earthly languages not known to the user, so the user could communicate to those from distant lands, so it is always for a purpose. Not to ecstatic speech or a personal prayer language or similar as practiced by many charismatic and Pentecostal Christians. The 1991 National Church Life Survey in Australia found that approximately 5% of Australian Adventists approve of and/or speak in tongues, whereas 11% have no opinion and approximately 85% disapprove. This was the highest disapproval rating amongst all denominations surveyed. An Adventist with an acceptance for charismatic experiences could be considered progressive in one sense, particularly because traditional and mainstream Adventist views reject the Pentecostal and charismatic movements.

=== Fundamental Beliefs ===
Although belief "17. Spiritual Gifts and Ministries" of the official 28 Fundamental Beliefs of Adventists affirms that spiritual gifts do continue into the present. Adventists more often limit it to the ability to speak unlearned human languages, or "xenoglossy"; and have generally rejected the form of tongues practised by many charismatic and Pentecostal Christians, described as ecstatic speech or a "personal prayer language". Supporting this position is Gerhard Hasel, who believed the practice refers to unknown human languages only, and not angelic languages nor ecstatic speech. His document has been frequently cited by Adventists. The Handbook of Seventh-day Adventist Theology takes the position that speaking in tongues refers to "previously unlearned human languages" (xenoglossy), using the experience on the day of Pentecost in Acts 2 as the "criterion" for later interpretation. David Asscherick also believes tongues are xenoglossy only. See also other Adventist commentators.

== History ==
=== Modern ===
Few modern Adventist individuals and churches have charismatic leanings, or practice speaking in tongues, after coming into contact with its practices such as in the "Holy Flesh movement" in Indiana around the turn of the 19th century which Ellen White quickly rebuked." Some claim they see evidence in some teachings on holiness by medical doctor John Harvey Kellogg, and Jones and Waggoner of 1888 fame. Jon Paulien describes "the Montanists regarded as heresy, early charismatics who believed that every Christian was as inspired as the apostles or the Scriptures. The focus on the Spirit as the key to church life is now mirrored by some in Adventist circles as well." In September 1999 "Discerning the Spirit" conferences were held in the Australian part of the church. Adventist churches with charismatic leanings are very rare and controversial within the denomination, and rejected on the whole. New Life Celebration church was one of the earliest Adventist "celebration churches". Some such churches have had tension with the Adventist leadership, and some have left the Adventist denomination. Retired Australian Adventist pastor, evangelist and former official of the Greater Sydney Conference, E. Bruce Price has criticized the churches, which he says were introduced to the world Adventist church in the 1980s. According to Adventist historians Bull and Lockhart, "Adventist worship is generally restrained and carefully organized".

== See also ==
- Seventh-day Adventist theology
- Progressive Adventism
- Historic Adventism
- Seventh-day Adventist worship
