= A. F. Ballenger =

Seventh-day Adventist Minister

A. F. Ballenger (1861–1921) was a Seventh-day Adventist Minister who started the "Receive Ye the Holy Ghost" movement which helped inspire the Holy Flesh movement in the Seventh-day Adventist Church which Ellen White rebuked, and he was later dismissed from the church.

== Biography ==
Ballenger received his ministerial license from the SDA Church in 1885 and began to gain prominence in the late 1880s as a religious liberty advocate. He became a leading advocate for renewed emphasis on the Holy Spirit. He inspired the Holy Flesh movement in the Adventist church. Around 1900, Ballenger started teaching a “new theology” on salvation in Christ, and also that legal justification—universal forgiveness—has already been given to all men. He then came out against the Adventist understanding of the investigative judgment and believed that the atonement occurred at Christ's crucifixion and that He had entered the Most Holy Place at His ascension contrary to SDA Doctrine, which teaches that the atonement work continued in the heavenly sanctuary when Christ ascended to the Holy Place, and then in 1844, at the end of the prophetic period of 2300 days, Christ entered the Most Holy Place. He later was removed from his post as superintendent of Irish Missions and dismissed from the church over the teaching.

== Ellen White's critique ==
In January 1900, Ellen White received a vision about the Holy Flesh movement while in Australia. S. N. Haskell (1833–1922) and A. J. Breed were sent to the camp meeting at Muncie to meet this "fanaticism". At the 1901 General Conference Session, Ellen White criticized the Holy Flesh teachings as "error" on April 17 stating:

"The Holy Spirit never reveals Itself in such methods, in such a bedlam of noise. This is an invention of Satan to cover up his ingenious methods for making of none effect the pure, sincere, elevating, ennobling, sanctifying truth for this time. Better never have the worship of God blended with music than to use musical instruments to do the work which last January was represented to me would be brought into our camp meetings. The truth for this time needs nothing of this kind in its work of converting souls. A bedlam of noise shocks the senses and perverts that which if conducted aright might be a blessing. The powers of satanic agencies blend with the din and noise, to have a carnival, and this is termed the Holy Spirit's working.

White also came out against Ballenger's 'new light' on Universalism and beliefs on the heavenly sanctuary, and implied that satanic forces were directing the work against the Sanctuary.

== See also ==
- Seventh-day Adventist Church
