= Adventist Church of Promise =

Brazilian Christian denomination (1932-)

- Classification: Protestant, Evangelical
- Orientation: Adventist, Pentecostal
- Polity: Congregational
- Associations: Friendly relationship with General Conference of the Church of God (Seventh-Day)
- Region: South America, Africa, North America, Europe
- Founder: Pastor João Augusto da Silveira
- Origin: 24 January 1932; 94 years ago Paulista, Pernambuco, Brazil
- Separated from: Seventh-day Adventist Church
- Members: 200,000
- Official website: https://promessistas.org/

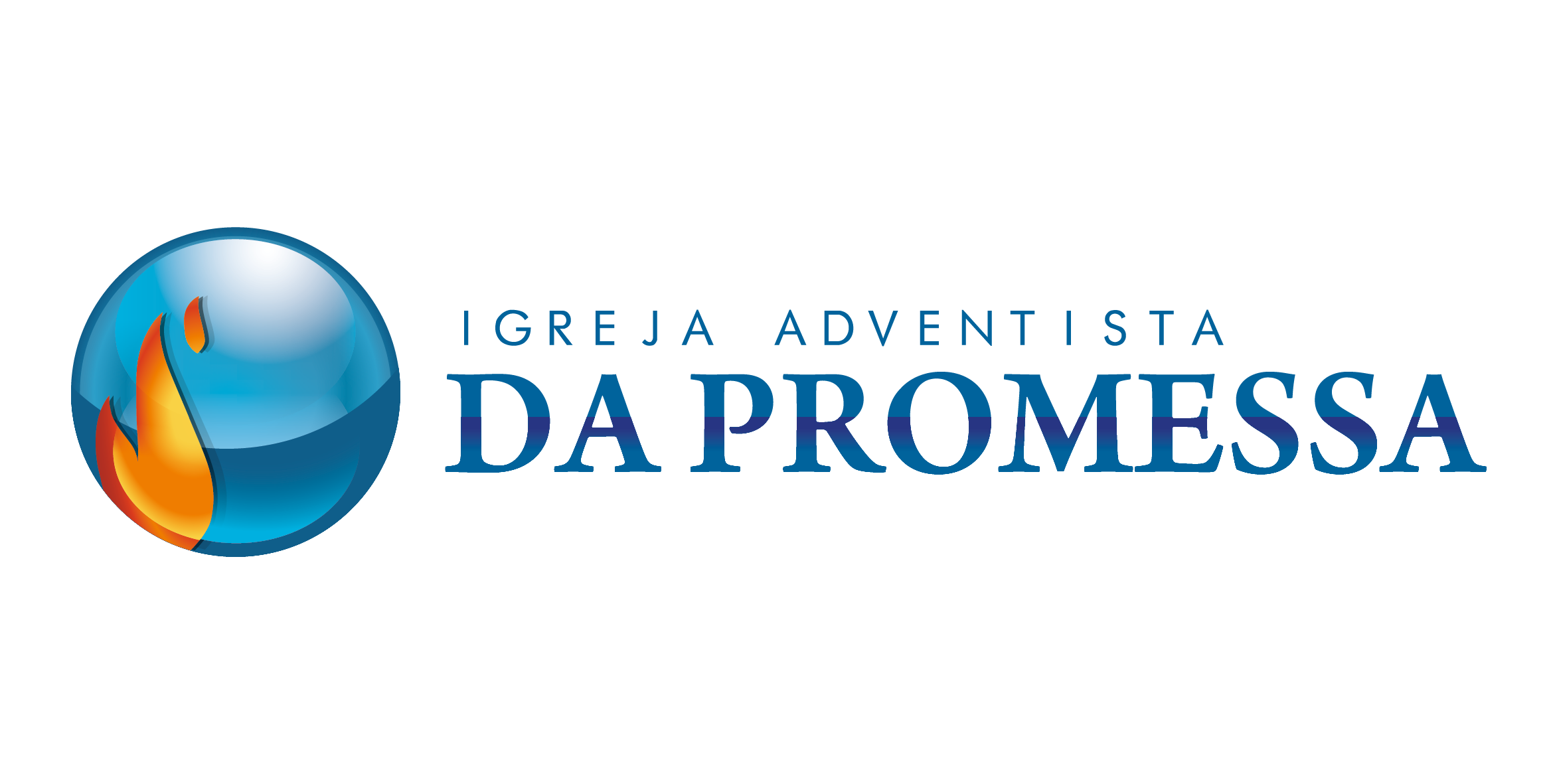
The logo

The Adventist Church of Promise (Portuguese: Igreja Adventista da Promessa or "IAP") is an evangelical Christian denomination which is both Sabbatarian Adventist and classical Pentecostal in its doctrine and worship. It was founded in Brazil in 1932 by pastor John August Silveira (Portuguese João Augusto da Silveira), as a split-off from the Seventh-day Adventist Church.

It is the second-largest Adventist denomination in South America (after the Seventh-day Adventist Church). It claims to be the first indigenous Brazilian Pentecostal denomination. (The earlier Assemblies of God in Brazil were introduced from the United States). Most of the church members live in Brazil, yet the church is also present in other countries: Argentina, Paraguay, Chile, Bolivia, Colombia, El Salvador, United States, Portugal, Spain, Nigeria, Mozambique, Cameroon and Uruguay. Worldwide there are approximately 200,000 Adventists of Promise.

== Beliefs ==
The Adventist Church of Promise believes in:

- Verbal inspiration of the Bible, sola scriptura and inerrancy of the Bible,
- Trinity: Father, Son and Holy Spirit,
- Virgin birth of Jesus Christ, substitutionary atonement on the cross, resurrection and ascension of Jesus,
- Jesus Christ as the only Saviour and only mediator between God and men,
- Justification is only by grace through faith, not by works,
- Experience of new birth or acceptance of Jesus as a personal Lord and Savior is absolutely necessary for salvation,
- Water baptism by immersion must be preceded by personal repentance and faith in the gospel,
- Baptism with the Holy Spirit is another blessing for those who believed,
- Initial evidence of the baptism with the Holy Spirit is always speaking with other tongues,
- Holy living, sanctification and obeying Ten Commandments is consequence of receiving salvation,
- Difference between ceremonial and moral laws of God; the moral law (Ten Commandments) is still valid for all Christians,
- The Seventh-day Sabbath, blessed and sanctified by God after creation, is still the holy day of rest and worship,
- Supernatural spiritual gifts (tongues, prophecy etc.) are as widespread as in the first century,
- Divine healing and all of the apostolic era signs are still available for the Church today,
- Christian temperance includes full abstinence from all alcoholic drinks, tobacco and unclean foods,
- Three ordinances of Christ: water baptism of repentant sinners, Lord’s Supper and washing of feet,
- Marriage between one man and one woman,
- Death is unconscious sleep until the resurrection (conditional immortality),
- Very soon premillennial second coming of Christ,
- Millennial Kingdom of Christ with saints in heaven,
- Postmillennial Great White Throne Judgment, annihilation of the wicked and restoration of the Earth to paradise.

== See also ==
- Charismatic Adventism
