= Ballinger (surname) =

Ballinger is a Germanic and English surname with Norman influences. Variants include Bellinger, Balinger, Barringer, Bellanger, Behringer, Berninger, Bailinger. Notable people with the surname include:

- Bob Ballinger (born 1974), Arkansas senator
- Colleen Ballinger, American comedian, actress, singer and YouTube personality
- Bill Ballinger (born 1945), Canadian politician
- Bill S. Ballinger (1912–1980) American author and screenwriter
- Heather Ballinger (born 1982), Australian rugby league player
- Ian Ballinger (1925–2008), New Zealand sports shooter and Olympic bronze medalist
- Mandi Ballinger (1975–2025), American politician from Georgia
- Margaret Ballinger (1894–1980), first President of the Liberal Party of South Africa
- Mark Ballinger (1949–2014), American Major League Baseball pitcher
- Paul Ballinger (born 1953), New Zealand long-distance runner
- Richard A. Ballinger (1858–1922), Mayor of Seattle, Washington, and U.S. Secretary of the Interior
- William Pitt Ballinger (1825–1888), Texas lawyer and statesman

== See also ==
- Art Balinger (1915–2011), American actor
