= Louis Glavis =

American lawyer

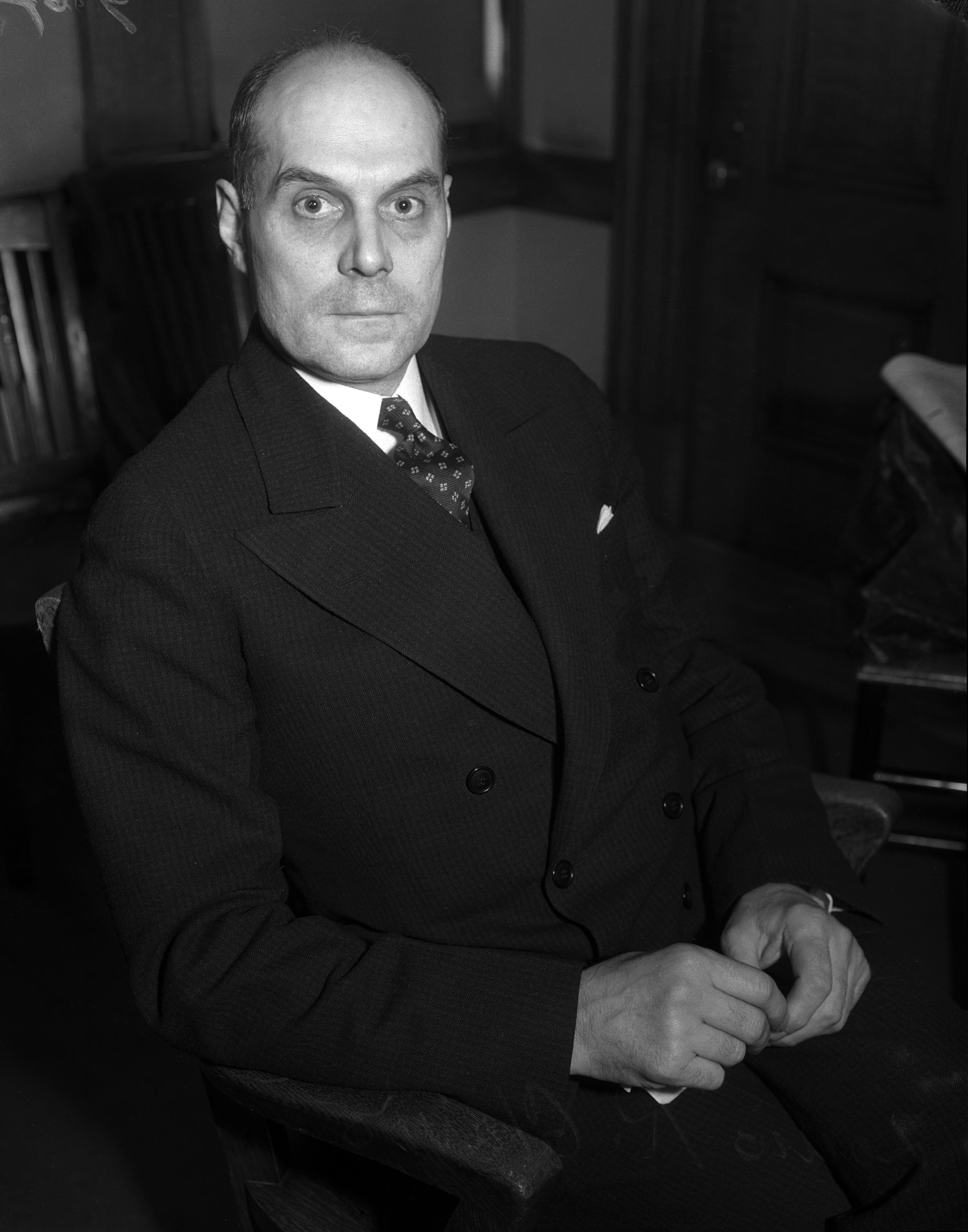
Glavis in 1934

Louis Russell Glavis (1883–1971) was an American lawyer and an employee of the United States Department of the Interior. He was a prominent figure in the 1910 Pinchot–Ballinger controversy; a political dispute between President Taft's Secretary of Interior, Richard Ballinger and conservationist Gifford Pinchot over Governmental conservation policies.

== Biography ==
In 1909, Glavis was an agent of the Department's United States General Land Office's Field Division in the northwestern United States and was based in Portland, Oregon. He provided Pinchot with information about land deals in Alaska which he, Glavis, believed were illegal. Pinchot, in turn, accused Secretary Ballinger of providing Clarence Cunningham's syndicate of land claims that did not respect Roosevelt's conservation policies; policies Taft claimed to uphold in his administration. These accusations led to the controversy. After a Senate hearing, Ballinger was exonerated and Glavis was fired on the grounds of insubordination by President Taft who supported Ballinger's position.

In 1933, Glavis was rehired by incoming Secretary of Interior Harold L. Ickes as Chief of the Division of Investigation. This Division was responsible for investigating charges of corruption involving all the Department's many business contracts. However, after three years, Ickes found Glavis to have a generally insubordinate nature. Glavis would conduct unauthorized surveillance of Department employees he felt were disloyal, for example. Ultimately, Glavis resigned from the Department in the summer of 1936 and was transferred to a Senate investigating committee. Later, Ickes wrote in his diary that he felt disappointed in Glavis, whom Ickes had once admired for his honesty; and that he had been unfairly unjust toward Ballinger, someone he had opposed in 1910, as he had also had to act in a similar way with Glavis. In the biographical supplement that came with the Ickes diaries that were published in 1953, it is mentioned that Glavis had returned to a private law practice.

== Bibliography ==
- Ickes, Harold, The Secret Diary of Harold L. Ickes: The First Thousand Days, New York, Simon and Schuster, 1953.
- Mowry, George, The Era of Theodore Roosevelt, New York, Harper & Row, 1958 SBN 06-133022-1
- Watkins, T.H., Righteous Pilgrim, New York, Henry Holt and Co., 1990, ISBN 0-8050-2112-4 (pbk.)
