= Balinger =

Ship type

A balinger, or ballinger was a type of small, sea-going vessel. It was swift and performed well under both sail and oars. It was probably developed in Bayonne for hunting whales. The ships were used in the conquest of Anglesey in 1282. They were also in use in the 15th and 16th centuries. They were distinguished by their lack of a forecastle, and by carrying either a square sail, or a sail extended on a sprit on a single mast. They were generally less than 100 tons, with a shallow draught, and the earlier vessels at least carried 30 or more oars for use in sheltered areas or for close fighting. They were mainly used for coastal trade, but could also be used as transports, carrying around forty soldiers. A number were employed in the early Royal Navy for this purpose.

An early reference appears in the Calendar of Patent Rolls for December 1374, when Thomas Rede, master, and the quartermasters and constable of the ballinger of Fulston were (with others) to be arrested by the constable of Dover Castle.

In June 1377, only days after the death of King Edward III and before his successor Richard II had been crowned, a French fleet attacked English ports along the English Channel. In response, Richard's regency council ordered towns across England to build a total of 25 balingers. The build order sent to the city of York is preserved in the National Archives: "Order at the cost of the best, most able and richest men of the city only, [...] to cause one small barge called a ‘balingere’ with from 50 to 40 oars."

Another reference dates from July 1387, when merchants William Terry, John Tutbury and Peter Stellar of Hull, and Walter Were of Grimsby were reported to have "equipped a ship, ballinger and barge at their own expense to arm themselves 'against the king's enemies'."

A statute of 1441 referring to pirate raids on the south coast of England contained a request from the House of Commons of England asking King Henry VI to provide "eight ships with four stages, carrying one with the other 150 men each. Every great ship was to have in its company a barge, with 80 men, and a ballinger, with 40; and there were also to be four pinnances, with twenty-five men in each."

Despite their long history there are no confirmed illustrations of a balinger in contemporary medieval sources while a confirmed archaeological example has yet to be discovered. Speculation suggests that it may have resembled a modern Thames barge in overall size but with a square rig.
