= Holy Flesh movement =

7th-day Adventist movement (1890s-1901)

The term Holy Flesh movement is a derogatory term given to a brief but controversial religious movement within the Seventh-day Adventist Church from the late 1890s till 1901. They sought a physical demonstration of the "spirit" and shouted and prayed and sang until someone in the congregation would fall, prostrate and unconscious, from his seat. When the subject revived, he was counted among those who had passed through the "Gethsemane experience", had obtained holy flesh, and had translation faith. Thereafter, it was asserted, he could not sin and had obtained a form of immortal assurance. The doctrinal teachings of this movement regarding the nature of Christ's humanity is that he took the nature of Adam before the Fall.

The movement in Indiana, just before the wider outbreak of Pentecostal-like phenomena in the U.S. state, combined enthusiastic forms of worship with millenarian ideas about the perfectibility of human nature. Recent research suggests that the movement shaped Adventist attitudes towards charismatic religious experiences and worship styles for a century after.

== Beginnings ==
In the 19th century, sporadic outbreaks of emotionally expressive and body-centered worship styles occurred in various branches of evangelical Protestantism. The Holiness movement in particular spawned dozens of these, each with unique doctrinal content and associated personalities. An Adventist version, the so-called "holy flesh movement," followed the teachings of A. F. Ballenger (1861–1921), who was in turn influenced by the Holiness movement and who advocated an emphasis on the Holy Spirit in Christian thought and life.

== Indiana ==
In Indiana, Ballenger's ideas were picked up by S. S. Davis, a minister and evangelist, who was supported by his Conference president, Robert Donnell (1844–1937). Davis was impressed by the enthusiasm of a group of Pentecostals he worked with.

"The Holy Flesh theory alleged that those who follow the Saviour must have their fallen natures perfected by passing through a “Garden of Gethsemane” experience... Eyewitness accounts report that in their services the fanatics worked up a high pitch of excitement by use of musical instruments such as organs, flutes, fiddles, tambourines, horns, and even a big bass drum. They sought a physical demonstration and shouted and prayed and sang until someone in the congregation would fall, prostrate and unconscious, from his seat. One or two men, walking up and down the aisle for the purpose, would drag the fallen person up on the rostrum. Then about a dozen individuals would gather around the prostrate body, some singing, some shouting, and some praying, all at the same time. When the subject revived, he was counted among those who had passed through the Gethsemane experience, had obtained holy flesh, and had translation faith. Thereafter, it was asserted, he could not sin and would never die."

Like many short-lived, enthusiastic or revivalistic movements, this one died out by early 1901.

== Ellen White's critique ==
In January 1900, Ellen White received a vision about it while in Australia. S. N. Haskell (1833–1922) and A. J. Breed were sent to the campmeeting at Muncie to meet this "fanaticism". At the 1901 General Conference Session, Ellen White criticized the Holy Flesh teachings as "error" on April 17 stating:

"It is impossible to estimate too largely the work that the Lord will accomplish through His proposed vessels carrying out His mind and purpose. The things you have described as taking place in Indiana, the Lord has shown me would take place just before the close of probation. Every uncouth thing will be demonstrated. There will be shouting, with drums, music, and dancing. The senses of rational beings will become so confused that they cannot be trusted to make right decisions. And this is called the moving of the Holy Spirit."

"The Holy Spirit never reveals Itself in such methods, in such a bedlam of noise. This is an invention of Satan to cover up his ingenious methods for making of none effect the pure, sincere, elevating, ennobling, sanctifying truth for this time. Better never have the worship of God blended with music than to use musical instruments to do the work which last January was represented to me would be brought into our camp meetings. The truth for this time needs nothing of this kind in its work of converting souls. A bedlam of noise shocks the senses and perverts that which if conducted aright might be a blessing. The powers of satanic agencies blend with the din and noise, to have a carnival, and this is termed the Holy Spirit's working.

"When the camp meeting is ended, the good which ought to have been done and which might have been done by the presentation of sacred truth is not accomplished. Those participating in the supposed revival receive Impressions, which lead them adrift. They cannot tell what they formerly knew regarding Bible principles.

"No encouragement should be given to this kind of worship. The same kind of influence came in after the passing of the time in 1844. The same kind of representations were made. Men became excited, and were worked by a power thought to be the power of God...

"I will not go into all the painful history; it is too much. But last January the Lord showed me that erroneous theories and methods would be brought into our camp meetings, and that the history of the past would be repeated. I felt greatly distressed. I was instructed to say that at these demonstrations demons in the form of men are present, working with all the ingenuity that Satan can employ to make the truth disgusting to sensible people; that the enemy was trying to arrange matters so that the campmeetings, which have been the means of bringing the truth of the third angel's message before multitudes, should lose their force and influence.

"The Holy Spirit has nothing to do with such a confusion of noise and multitude of sounds as passed before me last January. Satan works amid the din and confusion of such music, which, properly conducted, would be a praise and glory to God. He makes its effect like the poison sting of the serpent.

"Those things which have been in the past will be in the future. Satan will make music a snare by the way in which it is conducted. God calls upon His people, who have the light before them in the Word and in the Testimonies, to read and consider, and to take heed. Clear and definite instruction has been given in order that all may understand. But the Itching desire to originate something new results in strange doctrines, and largely destroys the influence of those who would be a power for good if they held firm the beginning of their confidence in the truth the Lord had given them. "

== Influence on Later Adventist Attitudes ==
For the last hundred years or so, SDA attitudes towards charismatic experience and lively worship styles have been somewhat negative, due largely to Ellen White's negative response to the movement.

== See also ==
- Charismatic Adventism
