= Gene Bellinger =

American organizational theorist

Gene Bellinger (born March 9, 1948) is an American organizational theorist, systems thinker, and consultant, known for his work on systems thinking and knowledge management.

Bellinger obtained his BS in Physics and Computer Science from the Miami University in 1975, where he had started his studies in 1971. He started his career in industry and was Marketing Manager at Honeywell from 1983 to 1992. He started as independent consultant in 1992 working in the field of knowledge management, and from 1997 to 2005 manager Operations & Finance at the management consultancy firm Outsights. In 2009 he started the Systems Thinking World initiative, which he hosts ever since.

== Selected publications ==
- Bellinger, Gene and Scott Fortmann-Roe, Beyond Connecting the Dots: Modeling for Meaningful Results, 2013.

Articles, a selection:

- Bellinger, Gene. "Systems thinking, an operational perspective of the universe." Systems University on the Net 25 (1996).
- Bellinger, Gene, Durval Castro, and Anthony Mills. "Data, information, knowledge, and wisdom." 1997/2004.
- Bellinger, Gene. "Knowledge management—Emerging perspectives." Systems thinking (2004).
- Bellinger, Gene, Durval Castro, and Anthony Mills. "Data, Information, Knowledge, and Wisdom (2004)." Available at: www. systems-thinking. org/dikw/dikw. htm (accessed: 5 February 2006) (2006).
