= Bellinger (given name) =

Bellinger is a masculine given name. Notable people with the name include:

- Peter Bellinger Brodie (1815–1897), English geologist
- Peter Bellinger Brodie (conveyancer) (1778–1854), English lawyer
- William Bellinger Bulloch (1777–1852), American politician
