= Gerhard J. Bellinger =

German theologian (1931–2020)

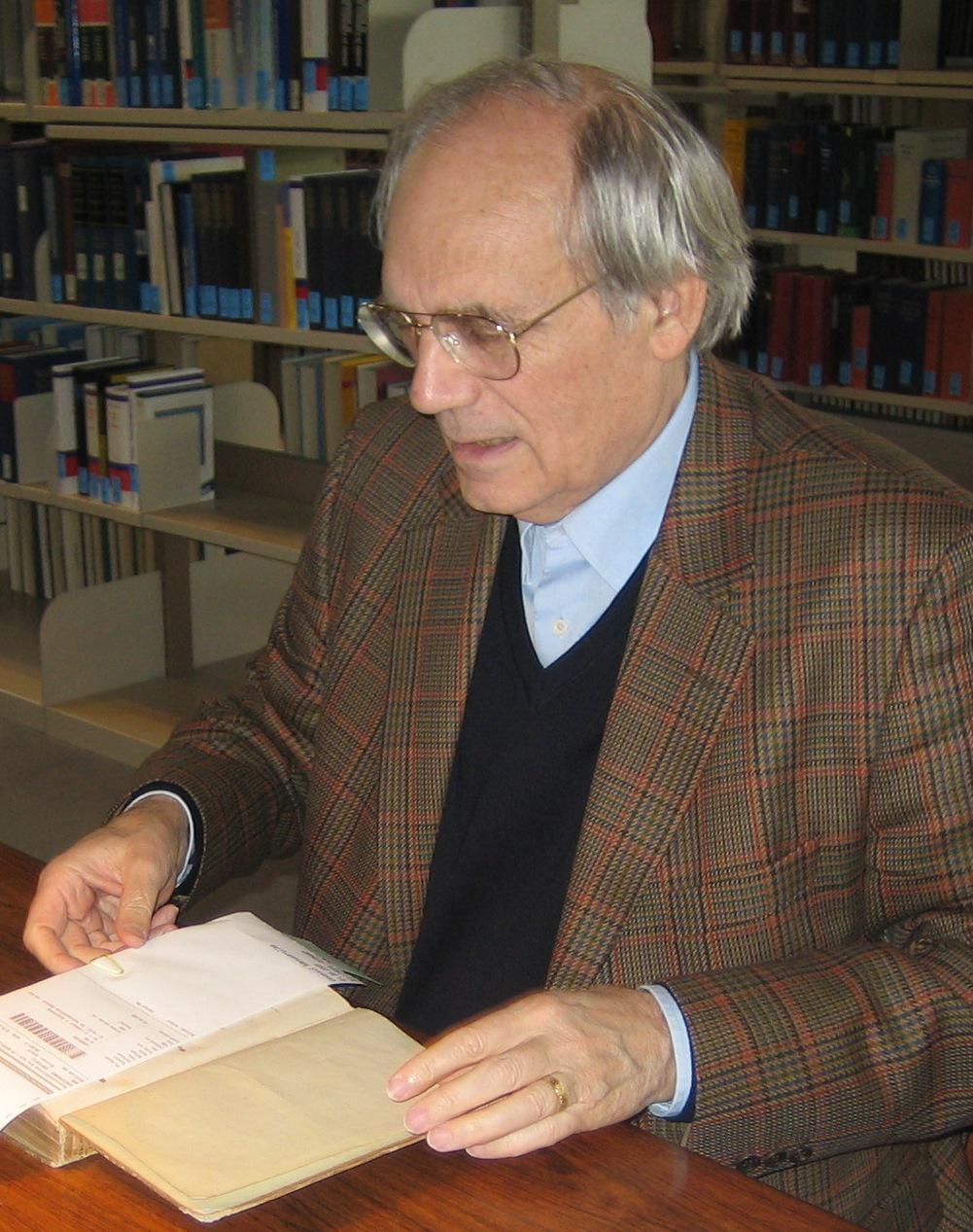
Bellinger in 2009.

Gerhard J. Bellinger (11 March 1931 – 20 June 2020) was a German theologian, university professor of the New Testament, the history of Christianity, and the history of religions at the Technical University of Dortmund.

== Study and occupation ==
Bellinger was born 1931 in Bochum, Westphalia, Prussia, Germany, and he got an Abitur in 1952 from the Collegium Josephinum Bonn. He died on 20 June 2020 in Bonn, North Rhine-Westphalia, Germany. He began his studies of philosophy, theology and history at Paderborn University and then at LMU Munich. At LMU Munich, he had been taught by Michael Schmaus (dogmatic Theology), Romano Guardini (philosophy of religion) just as by Helmut Kuhn (American cultural history and philosophy), Hermann Krings (philosophy) and Franz Schnabel (history).

In order to attain the degree in catholic theology, Bellinger continued his studies starting from 1961 at the University of Münster. There he was taught by Joseph Ratzinger, later Pope Benedict XVI. (dogmatic theology and dogma history), Walter Kasper (dogmatic theology), Johann Baptist Metz (fundamental theology) and above all by Theodor Filthaut (practical theology), which referred him to the Roman Catechism as topic of a thesis and became then also his doctor father. At the University of Münster, Bellinger 1966 obtained a "Doctor theologiae (Dr. theol.)" degree (Doctor of Theology in English), and 1967 he was nominated as scientific assistant at the educational university in Münster.

In 1970, Bellinger was appointed professor ordinarius for catholic theology and its didactics at the educational university Hagen, and in 1976 he moved to the educational university at Dortmund. From 1977 to 1979, Bellinger became dean for the faculty of catholic and Protestant theology. Since 1980, he teaches catholic theology and its didactics with the emphasis Theology of the New Testament and History of Christianity and History of religions at the Technical University of Dortmund. As teacher of the university, he had imparted in his lectures and seminars to the necessary knowledge of instruction religious teachings during three decades generations of studying for the teaching profession in the different school stages. According to his name is designated the Professor Dr. Bellinger Foundation in the trusteeship of the SOS Children's Villages foundation, by which all children and young person in the SOS Kinderdorf support within the range of the education and the training experience. On the occasion of his retirement in 1996, Bellinger received an anniversary publication from his colleagues and friends.

== Teaching and research ==
His teaching and research cover a wide field ranging from historical to literary studies. His achievements are finding national and international acknowledgement. Apart from his training activity at the university Bellinger wrote important specialized books, which were translated into thirteen languages.

Within the range of the Theology of the New Testament, which represented the principal part of his topics in lectures and seminars, the "Great Bible Guide" (1985), in whom he cooperated substantially, is translated into three languages: French (1990), Spanish (1991) and Russian (1993). One of his major works is his comprehensive book "Jesus: life – working – fate" (2009), which appears as a summary of his lectures about the theology of the New Testament.

On the area of the History of Christianity his main point of research was the history of the denominational catechisms, whereby he has written in continuation of his thesis the "Bibliography of the Roman Catechism" (1983), and he also has examined the "First Cathecismo Pequeno of Diogo Ortiz de Vilhegas", a manual of catechetic instruction, which appeared in the year 1504 in Lisbon and as first of all has used the word "catechism" as title for this kind of books.

In his point of research History of religions he occupied himself strongly with the religions of mankind and the myths of the peoples. The results of his researches are several times published. His "Great Religions Guide. 670 religions, churches and cults." (1986) is translated into five languages: Italian (1989), Hungarian ((1993), Polish (1999), French ((2000) and Serbian (2004).

Likewise, his "Great Encyclopedia of the mythology. 3100 items to the myths of all people" (1989) is often printed and translated into five languages: Danish (1993), Slovenian (1997), Polish (2003), Chinese (2006) and Bulgarian (2008).

A contribution to the Sexualethik of the religions is his comprehensive work "Sexuality in the religions of the world" (1993), which is translated into Czech (1998).

Furthermore, he wrote over 800 reference articles for general reference books and specialized encyclopedias as well as numerous essays in specialized scientific compilations, manuals and magazines.

== Publications ==
- Der Catechismus Romanus und die Reformation. Die katechetische Antwort des Trienter Konzils auf die Haupt-Katechismen der Reformatoren. Paderborn 1970. – Reprint 1987. ISBN 3-487-07849-X
- Bibliographie des Catechismus Romanus Ex Decreto Concilii Tridentini ad Parochos (1566–1978). Baden-Baden 1983. ISBN 3-87320-087-2.
- Knaurs Großer Bibelführer. München (1985) 1999. ISBN 3-426-66417-8.
- Knaurs Großer Religionsführer. 670 Religionen, Kirchen und Kulte. München (1986) 1992. ISBN 3-426-26221-5
- Knaurs Lexikon der Mythologie. 3100 Stichwörter zu den Mythen aller Völker. München (1989) 1999. ISBN 3-426-66415-1
- Im Himmel wie auf Erden. Sexualität in den Religionen der Welt. München 1993. ISBN 3-426-26502-8
- "Der erste Cathecismo von 1504 und sein Verfasser Diogo Ortiz des Vilhegas". In: Communio et sacramentum. Pamplona 2003. ISBN 84-8081-011-4, S. 201–219.
- Bautz, Traugott, ed. (2004). "Ortiz de Vilhegas, Diogo". Biographisch-Bibliographisches Kirchenlexikon (BBKL) (in German). Vol. 23. Nordhausen: Bautz. cols. 1036–1040. ISBN 3-88309-155-3.
- Jesus: Leben – Wirken – Schicksal. Norderstedt 2009. ISBN 978-3-8370-3964-1; E-Book 2012. ISBN 978-3-8448-8981-9.

== Literature ==
- Hermann Horn (Hrsg.): Didaskalos. Studien zum Lehramt in Universität, Schule und Religion. Festschrift für Gerhard J. Bellinger zum 65. Geburtstag. Dortmund 1996. ISBN 3-928861-52-2.
- Kürschners Deutscher Gelehrten-Kalender 2005. Bio-bibliographisches Verzeichnis deutschsprachiger Wissenschaftler der Gegenwart. 20th ed., Saur, Munich 2005. ISBN 3-598-23612-3.
