= David Asscherick =

Seventh-day Adventist minister and evangelist

- Spouse: Violeta Asscherick
- Children: 2 children, Landon Asscherick & Jabel Asscherick

Ecclesiastical career
- Church: Seventh-day Adventist
- Congregations: Sonora Seventh-day Adventist Church, Kingscliff Seventh-day Adventist Church

David Asscherick (/ˈæʃərɪk/ ASH-ə-rik) is a speaker/director for Light Bearers Ministry and has been featured on 3ABN and Hope Channel. He is also the former pastor of the Troy Seventh-day Adventist Church in Troy, Michigan and Kingscliff Seventh-day Adventist church in Chinderah, New South Wales, Australia (2014–2020).

A former punk rocker, David became a Seventh-day Adventist Christian at the age of 23 and went on to become a pastor, co-founder of ARISE and author of God in Pain.
