= Ballenger Building =

- U.S. National Register of Historic Places
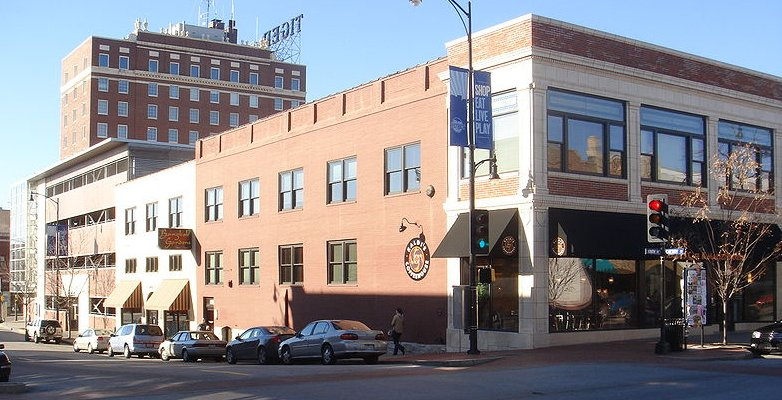

- Location within Missouri Location within the United States
- Location: Columbia, Missouri
- Coordinates: 38°57′2″N 92°19′40″W
- Area: less than one acre
- Built: c. 1892, c. 1904, 1928
- Architectural style: Two-Part Commercial Block
- MPS: Downtown Columbia, Missouri MPS
- NRHP reference No.: 03001474
- Added to NRHP: January 21, 2004

The Ballenger Building, also known as G.F. Troxell Furniture Store, Taylor Music and Furniture Co., and Safeway, is a historic commercial building located in downtown Columbia, Missouri. It was originally built about 1892, and expanded rearward about 1904. It was extensively remodeled in 1928. It is a two-story brick building on a stone foundation. It features terra cotta ornamentation and Chicago school style windows. Today it holds Kaldi's Coffee House.

It was listed on the National Register of Historic Places in 2004.
