= Pinchot–Ballinger controversy =

Dispute among officials in the US government

Pinchot–Ballinger controversy

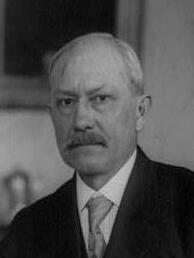
Richard A. Ballinger

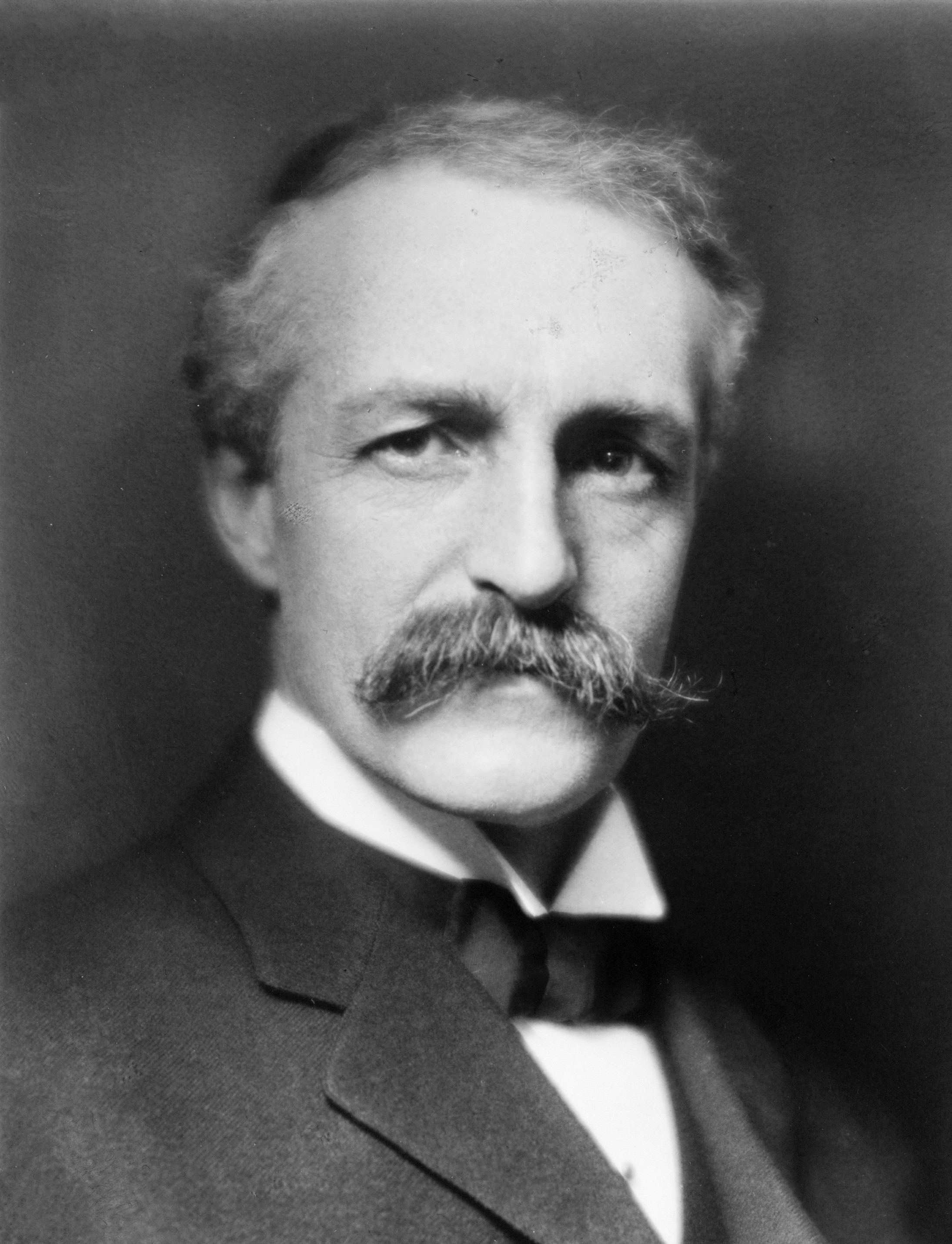
Gifford Pinchot

The Pinchot–Ballinger controversy, also known as the Ballinger affair, was a 1909–10 political controversy in the United States between interior secretary Richard A. Ballinger and United States Forest Service chief Gifford Pinchot regarding departmental authority, conservation, and privatization of resource rights. Pinchot and his progressive allies accused Ballinger of improperly granting private access to public resources and shielding corporate interests from scrutiny in return for financial benefit, and Pinchot was later dismissed by President William Howard Taft for insubordination.

Between 1909 and 1910, the dispute between the two officials and their supporters escalated to a battle within the Republican Party between Taft (who defended Ballinger) and his predecessor, Theodore Roosevelt (who supported Pinchot, his close personal friend). While Ballinger was eventually cleared of the charges at the core of the dispute, the affair contributed to renewed attention for the conservation movement, a growing schism in the Republican Party, that party's defeat in the 1910 United States elections, and Roosevelt's decision to challenge Taft in 1912.

== Background ==
In 1898, President William McKinley appointed Gifford Pinchot to head the United States Division of Forestry. In 1905, under Theodore Roosevelt, the Division was reorganized within the Department of Agriculture as the United States Forest Service (USFS), which took over management of the United States forest reserves from the General Land Office (GLO) in the Department of the Interior. Pinchot remained head of the USFS after its reorganization. In 1907, Roosevelt appointed Seattle mayor Richard A. Ballinger to lead the GLO under interior secretary James Rudolph Garfield.

In keeping with an earlier promise, Roosevelt opted not to seek another term in the 1908 presidential election. Instead, he publicly endorsed Secretary of War William Howard Taft as his successor and left the country in early 1909 for an expedition to Africa. In March 1909, Taft began his presidency by replacing Garfield in the cabinet with Ballinger. Ballinger's appointment was a disappointment to conservationists, who interpreted the change as a break with the Roosevelt administration's policies on conservation. Within weeks of taking office, Ballinger reversed some of Garfield's policies, including restoring 3 million acres (12,000 km²) of preserved land to private use. Many of the policies which Ballinger reversed had been last-minute declarations by Roosevelt and Garfield during the lame duck period of his presidency.

Ballinger's chief critic was his own subordinate, United States Forestry Service chief Gifford Pinchot, who had overseen Roosevelt's conservation efforts and was Roosevelt's close personal friend. The dispute soon became a proxy for several latent political conflicts within the Republican Party—progressives versus conservatives, corporate interests versus public rights, East versus West, agriculture versus industry. In reaction to Ballinger's initial policy decisions, Pinchot became convinced that Ballinger was seeking to assist big business in gaining control of major water sources, and he claimed that Ballinger intended to "stop the conservation movement" entirely.

== Initial allegations ==
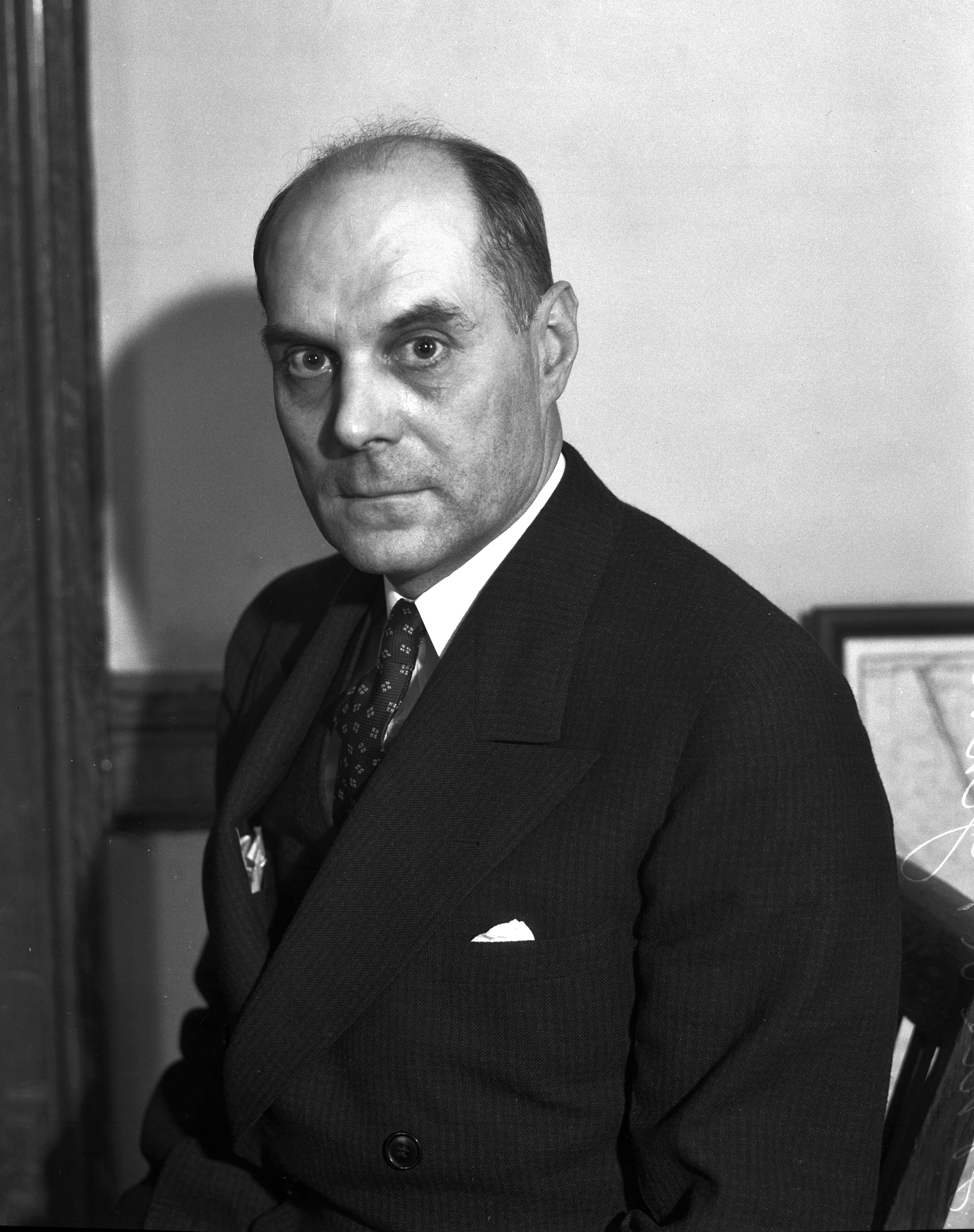
Louis Glavis (pictured 1934) was also a central figure in the dispute.

In August 1909, both Pinchot and Ballinger addressed the National Irrigation Conference in Spokane, Washington. Pinchot "threw down the gauntlet" by stating "unequivocally" that a national hydropower trust was "in the process of formation," aided by "strict construction" of the law, which inevitably championed "the great interests as against the people." Ballinger, under direct attack from Pinchot and the progressive press, merely recited a "routine dissertation on public-land matters." He was the only speaker not to accept questions, which drew an open rebuke from California governor George Pardee. Immediately after his Spokane speech, Pinchot took his case directly to Taft, claiming that waterpower interests had begun an immense land grab in Montana.

Parallel to Pinchot's allegations of a hydropower trust conspiracy, Portland, Oregon land office director Louis Glavis alleged that in 1907, Ballinger had obstructed an investigation the purchase of Alaska coal field claims by a syndicate, led by Seattle developer Clarence Cunningham and backed by J. P. Morgan and Simon Guggenheim. Glavis had launched an antitrust investigation into the Alaska Syndicate purchases, but Ballinger, as head of the GLO, rejected Glavis's findings and removed him from the investigation. Cunningham later hired Ballinger as legal counsel.

In 1909, Glavis sought support from Pinchot, whose jurisdiction over the Chugach National Forest included several of the Alaska claims. Glavis received a sympathetic response from Pinchot, Alexander Shaw, and Overton Price, who helped him to prepare a presentation for Taft. Pinchot also arranged a meeting between Taft and Glavis, at which Pinchot and Glavis delivered a 50-page report accusing Ballinger of improper conflicts of interest in his handling of the Cunningham purchases and his firing of Glavis.

== Dismissals ==
After consulting with attorney general George W. Wickersham, Taft issued a public letter in September 1909 exonerating Ballinger and authorizing the dismissal of Glavis on grounds of insubordination. At the same time, Taft tried to conciliate Pinchot and affirm his administration's pro-conservation stance. In response, Glavis took his case to the press. In November 1909, Collier's published an article elaborating on his allegations, The Whitewashing of Ballinger: Are the Guggenheims in Charge of the Department of the Interior?

In January 1910, Pinchot sent an open letter to progressive Iowa senator Jonathan P. Dolliver, who read it into the Congressional Record. In the letter, Pinchot praised Glavis as a "patriot," openly rebuked Taft, and called for congressional hearings into Ballinger's conduct. As a result of this letter, Taft promptly dismissed Pinchot.

== Congressional investigations and public reaction ==
From January to May 1910, Congress investigated the dismissals and Ballinger's handling of the 1907 Alaska Syndicate investigation. Ballinger was ultimately cleared of any impropriety, but his policies continued to receive criticism for favoring private enterprise and the exploitation of natural resources over conservation. During the hearings, Glavis was represented by future Supreme Court justice Louis Brandeis, who raised his profile as an advocate for progressive causes through his forceful arguments.

While on his African expedition for much of the controversy, Theodore Roosevelt declined to publicly comment but privately wrote to Pinchot, "I cannot believe it. I do not know any man in public life who has rendered quite the service you have rendered." Separately, he wrote to Massachusetts senator Henry Cabot Lodge that he would "say nothing about politics until I have been home long enough to know the situation" and affirmed that the party "must renominate" Taft. Nevertheless, public speculation that Roosevelt would come out publicly against Taft mounted. Dolliver said, "With Pinchot knocked out and [Rhode Island senator Nelson] Aldrich put in command, I think you can hear a roar in East Africa."

Pinchot met with Roosevelt at Porto Maurizio, Italy during the latter's return journey through Europe, where he shared his and others' criticisms of the Taft administration. Roosevelt then wrote to Lodge of his impression that the Taft administration had "completely twisted 'round the policies I advocated and acted upon."

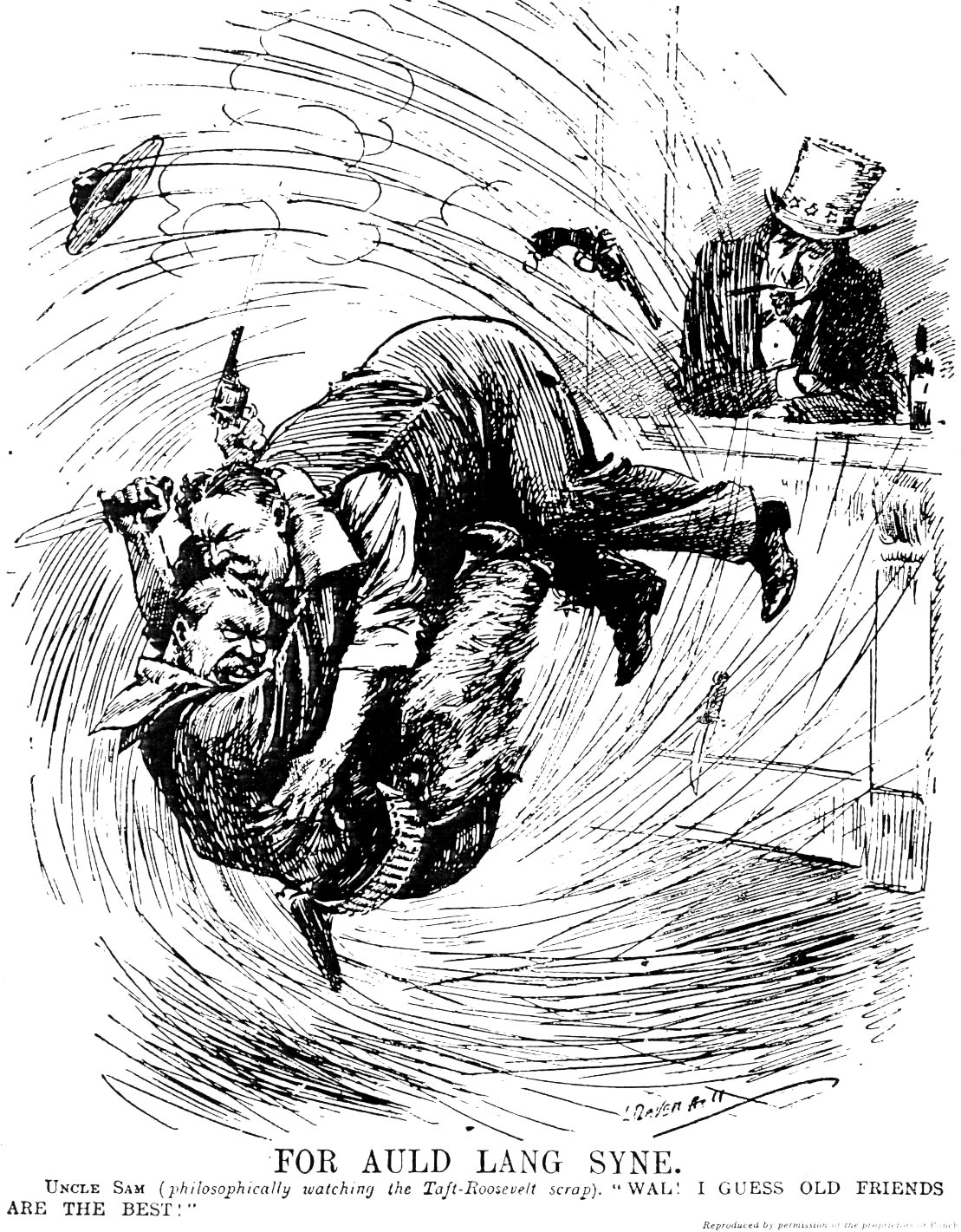
The May 1912 issue of Punch depicted a no-holds-barred fight between Taft (top) and Roosevelt for the Republican presidential nomination.

== Aftermath ==
Pinchot's dismissal alienated many Republican progressives and drove a personal wedge between Taft and Roosevelt, contributing to the split of the party in the 1912 presidential election.

As a leading icon of the progressive movement and conservation movement in the United States, Pinchot launched a political career in his native state of Pennsylvania. He served two terms as governor of Pennsylvania from 1923 to 1927 and 1931 to 1935. He made three unsuccessful bids for United States Senate and ran unsuccessfully for a final term as governor in 1938.

== Historical legacy ==
The clash had a long-term influence on the conservation movement, positioning it as one aspect of a broader class struggle between the rich, who ostensibly exploited resources, and the poor and working class, who benefited from their preservation. According to environmental historian Samuel P. Hays, however, many industrialists at the time in fact supported conservation programs as barriers to entry, and many farmers and workers opposed them as obstacles to economic expansion.

In 1939, Taft biographer Henry F. Pringle considered Ballinger an innocent victim of vindictive Roosevelt loyalists and of yellow journalism that gave their accusations validity:

An examination of thousands of pages of evidence can lead the impartial reader only to the conclusion that Ballinger was the victim of an attack fostered by fanaticism and nurtured by bad journalism. But Pinchot, Glavis, Hapgood [of Collier's Weekly], Sullivan [also of Collier's], Marse Henry [Henry Watterson of the Louisville Courier-Journal] and the rest handed down their verdict against Ballinger in 1909 and 1910 and a large element of the public believed that they had spoken justly.

Harold L. Ickes, interior secretary under Franklin D. Roosevelt, hired Glavis as a chief investigator in 1934 on the basis of his conduct during the controversy, during which Ickes had supported Pinchot and Glavis against Ballinger. Ickes found Glavis, who conducted unauthorized surveillance on employees whom he considered disloyal, generally insubordinate and excessively paranoid. Ickes published a popular account of his findings in The Saturday Evening Post, in which he recanted his 1910 position and referred to Ballinger as "an American Dreyfus." After an official investigation, his findings were expanded to a 58-page departmental report in 1940 that asserted Ballinger's innocence and paints Pinchot as a vindictive publicity-seeker who pitilessly pursued Ballinger even after Ballinger's death.
