= James M. Edmunds =

American politician (1810–1879)

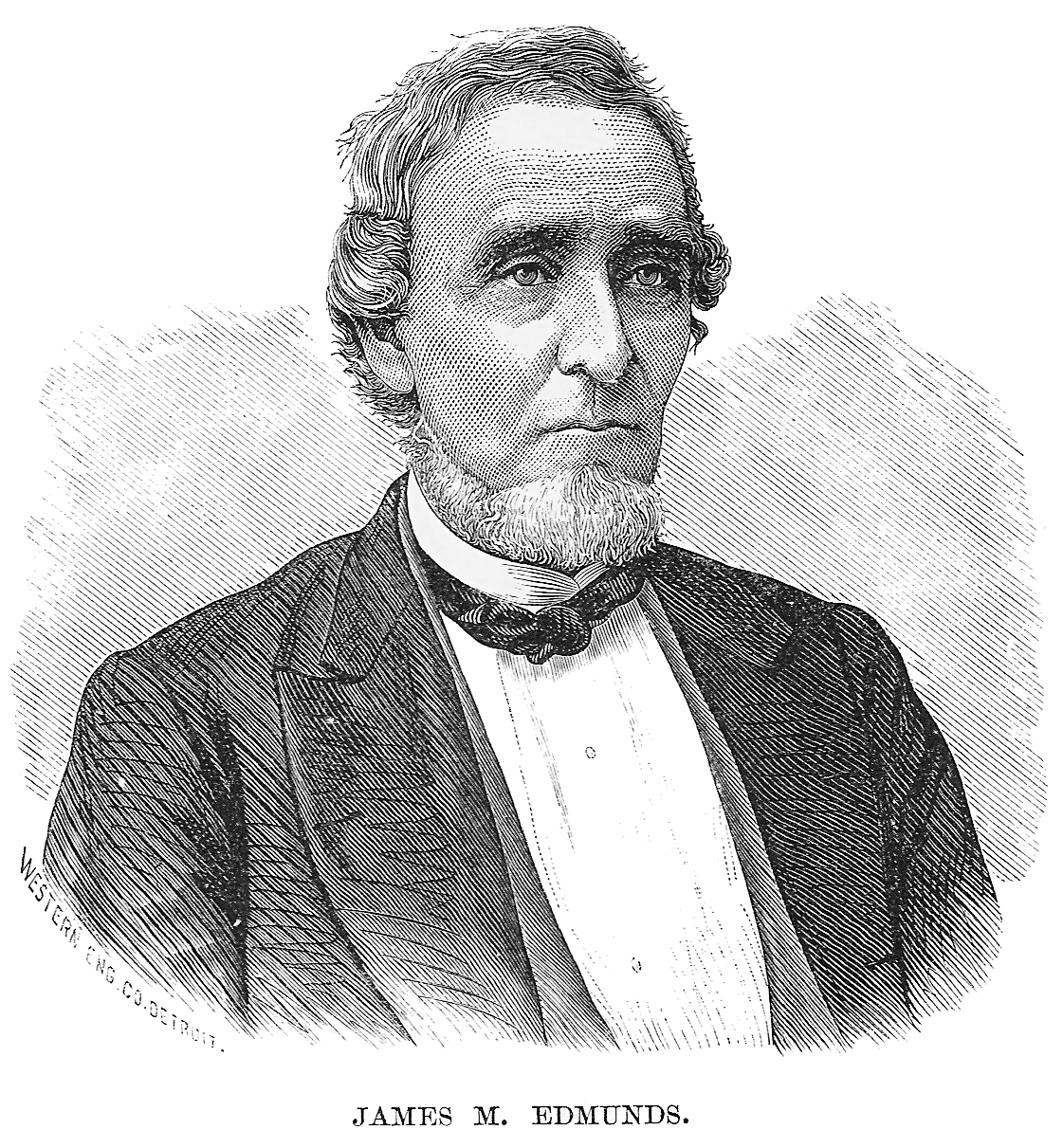
- Born: August 23, 1810; Niagara County, New York, U.S.
- Died: December 14, 1879 (aged 69); Washington, D.C., U.S.

James M. Edmunds (August 23, 1810 – December 14, 1879) was a politician from the U.S. state of Michigan who was the commissioner of the United States General Land Office of Washington, and the postmaster of Washington, D. C..

== Biography ==
Edmunds was born in Niagara County, New York, received a common school and academic education and taught school from 1826 to 1831.

In 1831, he moved to Ypsilanti, Michigan, where he became a merchant. He took an interest in the schools there and for ten years was an inspector of schools, also holding a number of other local positions. He was elected as a Whig to the Michigan Senate from Washtenaw County (5th district) 1840-41 and later to the Michigan House of Representatives 1846-47. In 1847, he was a Whig candidate for Governor of Michigan, losing to Epaphroditus Ransom. Edmunds was also a delegate to the constitutional convention of 1850 and member 1851.

In 1853 he moved to Detroit, engaged in the lumber business, extending his operations to Saginaw and Tuscola counties. In 1854, he became a Republican and chaired the Michigan Republican Party from 1855 to 1861. He was also Comptroller of Detroit during most of those years from 1857 to 1861. In 1859 he was appointed postmaster of Washington, D.C., and held that position until his death.

In 1861, Edmunds resigned as comptroller when he was appointed by U.S. President Abraham Lincoln as commissioner of the United States General Land Office of Washington, and he held that office until 1866. Edmunds was a member of the Southern Treaty Commission that renegotiated treaties with the Indian Tribes siding with the Confederacy. After resigning from the land office, he became postmaster of the Senate which he resigned in 1869.

He was also president of the Michigan Soldiers’ Relief Association in Washington, D.C. from its organization in 1861. He was also president of the National Council of the Union League from 1862 to 1869 and for a number of years published The Republic, a Washington magazine.

Edmunds died at the age of sixty-nine in Washington, D.C.

== Sources ==
- Political Graveyard
- Bingham, Stephen D. (2005) [1888]. "s.v. James M. Edmunds". Early history of Michigan, with biographies of state officers, members of Congress, judges and legislators. Pub. pursuant to act 59, 1887. Ann Arbor, Mich.: University of Michigan Library. p. 246.
- Lanman, Charles (2005) [1871]. "Biographical History of Michigan". The red book of Michigan; a civil, military and biographical history. Ann Arbor, Mich.: University of Michigan Library. p. 437.

Party political offices
Preceded by Stephen Vickery	Whig nominee for Governor of Michigan; 1847	Succeeded by Flavius J. Littlejohn
Preceded by Joseph Warren	Chairman of the Michigan Republican Party; 1855 – 1861	Succeeded by E.C. Walker
Political offices
Preceded by Joseph S. Wilson	Commissioner of the General Land Office; 1861–1866	Succeeded by Joseph S. Wilson
