= Gordon Graham Heiner =

United States Army general (1869–1943)

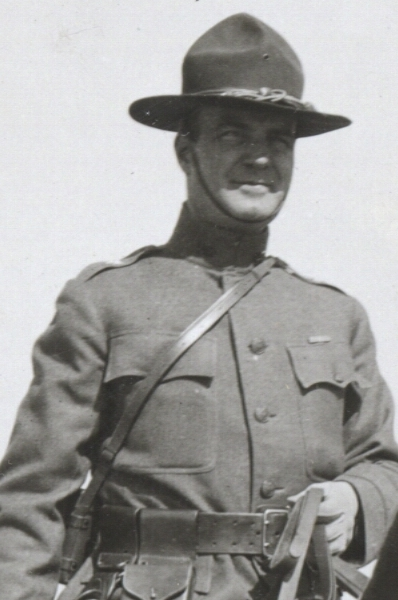
- Heiner in 1918
- Born: November 2, 1869; Washington, D.C., U.S.
- Died: December 23, 1943 (aged 74); Baltimore, Maryland, U.S.
- Burial place: Arlington National Cemetery
- Spouse: Elizabeth C. Kent (m. 1895)
- Children: 4
- Military career
- Allegiance: United States
- Branch: United States Army
- Service years: 1893–1929
- Rank: Brigadier general
- Service number: 0-315
- Commands: 30th Coast Artillery Brigade; 155th Field Artillery Brigade
- Conflicts: Spanish–American War; Border War (1910–19); World War I • Meuse-Argonne Offensive

Gordon Graham Heiner (November 2, 1869 – December 23, 1943) was a United States Army officer in the late 19th and early 20th centuries. He served in the Spanish–American War and World War I.

== Biography ==
Heiner was born in Washington, D.C., on November 2, 1869. His family had served as soldiers since the American Revolutionary War. Heiner graduated from West Virginia University in 1889 with an A.B., and he graduated from the United States Military Academy in 1893.

Heiner was commissioned into the Second Artillery as a second lieutenant, though he was later transferred to the Fourth Artillery. He served under Oswald Herbert Ernst during the Spanish–American War, campaigning in Cuba and Puerto Rico. Heiner then worked at West Point from 1900 to 1904 as an instructor for ordnance and gunnery, and then he graduated from the Artillery School with honors. He also served as a secretary, adjutant, and Chief of Staff of the Coast Artillery School at Fort Monroe. Heiner commanded the coastal defenses at Savannah, Georgia, and at Balboa, Panama, and he was detailed for four years with the Department of the inspector general. He served as the chief of staff of the Coast Artillery, Organized Reserve, Third Corps Area Headquarters in Baltimore. He commanded a provisional regiment from the Coast Artillery during the incidents at the border with Mexico.

Heiner was promoted to the rank of brigadier general on August 5, 1917. He commanded the 155th Field Artillery Brigade, training his soldiers at Camp Lee and then leading them to France on May 11, 1918, because of World War I. In France, he participated in the Meuse-Argonne Offensive. After the war's end, Heiner reverted to his permanent rank of lieutenant colonel, though he stayed in Bordeaux until June 1919 as assistant chief of staff at the port of embarkation. He was promoted to colonel on March 21, 1919. Heiner retired on September 10, 1929 after commanding the 30th Coast Artillery Brigade and Fort Eustis from September 15, 1928, to May 1, 1929. He was advanced to brigadier general on the retired list on June 21, 1930.

In retirement, Heiner served as the treasurer and as president of the Society of the Cincinnati in Pennsylvania. He died in Baltimore on December 23, 1943, and is buried at Arlington National Cemetery.

== Personal life ==
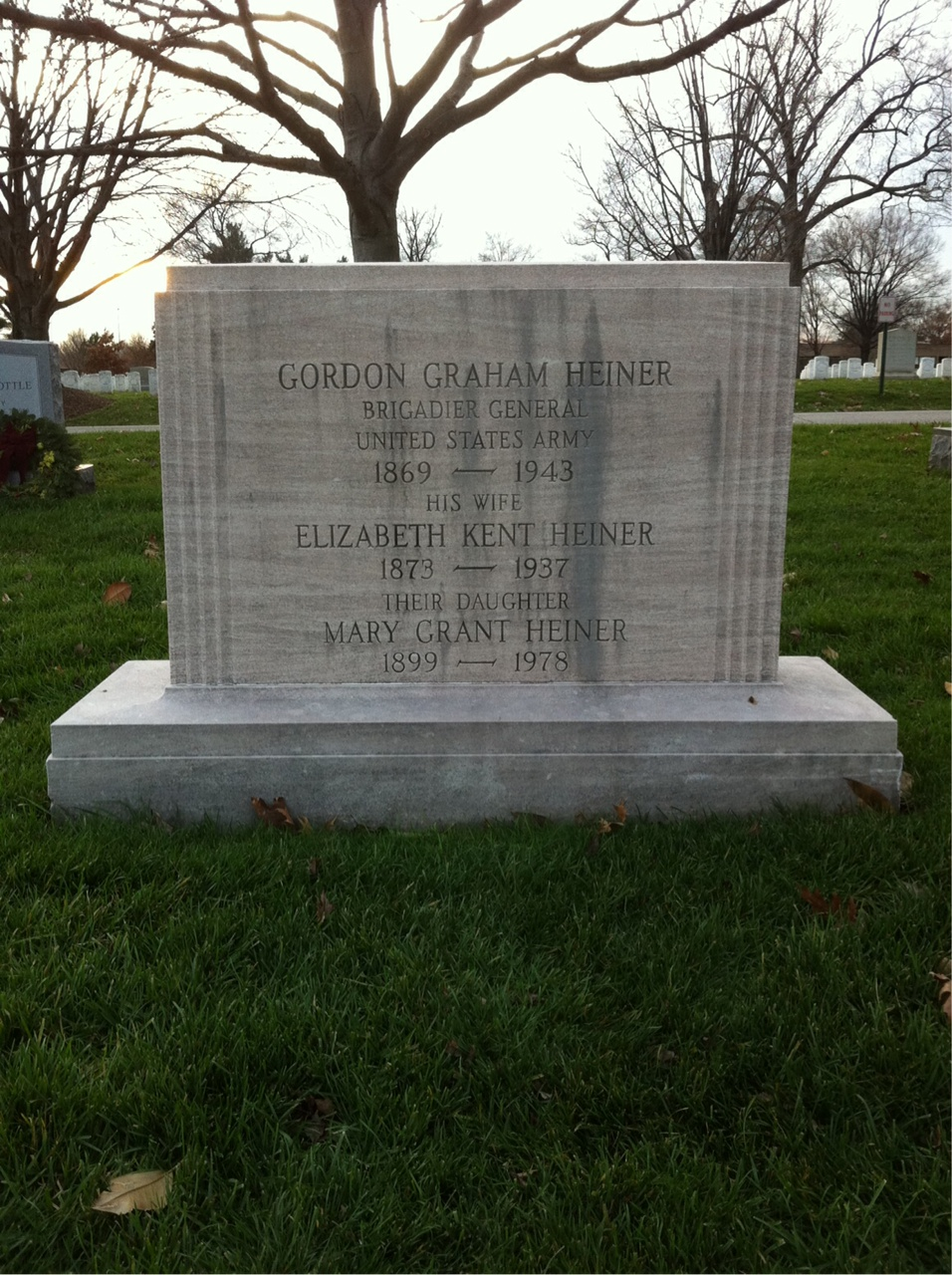
Grave of Heiner at Arlington National Cemetery

Heiner married Elizabeth C. Kent on November 12, 1895. Together, they had four children – two sons and two daughters. A fifth child died in infancy. His wife died on June 19, 1937.
