= Butternuts, New York =

- Town
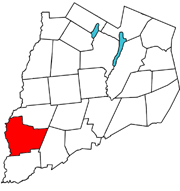
- Butternuts, Otsego County, New York
- Coordinates: 42°28′20″N 75°19′10″W
- Country: United States
- State: New York
- County: Otsego

Area
  - Total: 53.87 sq mi (139.52 km^{2})
  - Land: 53.83 sq mi (139.41 km^{2})
  - Water: 0.039 sq mi (0.10 km^{2})
- Elevation: 1,070 ft (326 m)

Population (2010)
  - Total: 1,786
  - Estimate (2016): 1,696
  - Density: 31.5/sq mi (12.17/km^{2})
- Time zone: UTC-5 (Eastern (EST))
  - Summer (DST): UTC-4 (EDT)
- ZIP code: 13776
- Area code: 607
- FIPS code: 36-11528
- GNIS feature ID: 0978770
- Website: www.townofbutternuts.org

Butternuts is a town located in Otsego County, New York, United States. As of the 2010 census, the town had a population of 1,786. The Town of Butternuts is located in the southwestern part of the county, and is west of Oneonta.

== History ==
Butternuts is generally believed to be named for three butternut (a.k.a. white walnut) trees growing from one stump that originally marked the corner of the townships of what is now New Lisbon, Pittsfield and Morris when this entire section of the county was surveyed by Richard Smith before the Revolution. Said tree was depicted as the corporate logo of the Butternuts Woolen & Cotton textile firm but was cut down by the Lull family to build their log cabin.

In 1787, Abijah Gilbert and Jacob Morris, early owners of land in the county, were among the first who settled the town, Morris giving Gilbert land of his choice as payment for his services. Ample waterpower sites allowed for many industries in addition to agriculture that benefitted by the wide fertile valley floor along the Butternut and Unadilla.

The town was established from part of the Town of Unadilla in 1796. The north part of Butternuts was annexed to form the Town of Morris in 1849, and additional territory was taken from the Town of Unadilla in 1857.

== Geography ==
According to the United States Census Bureau, the town has a total area of 54.1 square miles (140 km^{2}), of which 54.1 square miles (140 km^{2}) is land and 0.02% is water.

Butternuts Creek is an important stream flowing through the town. It was named by early settlers, who noted some unusual butternut trees growing near it.

New York State Route 51 is a north-south highway in Butternuts, and was one of the first concrete-paved highways in Upstate New York, starting from Mt. Upton northwards circa 1919.

The Butternut Creek flows diagonally through the town, from Morris to the creek's confluence with the Unadilla River in the southwestern corner of the town.

=== Butternuts town lines ===
- The northern line borders the Town of Morris in Otsego County.
- The eastern line borders the Town of Otego in Otsego County.
- The southern line borders the Town of Unadilla in Otsego County.
- The western line lies along the Unadilla River, bordering the towns of Norwich and Guilford in Chenango County.

== Demographics ==
Historical population
Census	Pop.	Note	%±
1820	3,601		—
1830	3,991		10.8%
1840	4,057		1.7%
1850	1,928		−52.5%
1860	2,365		22.7%
1870	2,174		−8.1%
1880	2,036		−6.3%
1890	1,813		−11.0%
1900	1,698		−6.3%
1910	1,453		−14.4%
1920	1,383		−4.8%
1930	1,260		−8.9%
1940	1,369		8.7%
1950	1,315		−3.9%
1960	1,352		2.8%
1970	1,433		6.0%
1980	1,486		3.7%
1990	1,626		9.4%
2000	1,792		10.2%
2010	1,786		−0.3%
2016 (est.)	1,696		−5.0%
U.S. Decennial Census

As of the census of 2000, there were 1,792 people, 715 households, and 502 families residing in the town. The population density was 33.1 inhabitants per square mile (12.8/km^{2}). There were 902 housing units at an average density of 16.7 per square mile (6.4/km^{2}). The racial makeup of the town was 97.32% White, 0.78% African American, 0.39% Native American, 0.22% Asian, 0.45% from other races, and 0.84% from two or more races. Hispanic or Latino of any race were 1.17% of the population.

There were 715 households, out of which 30.5% had children under the age of 18 living with them, 58.9% were married couples living together, 7.0% had a female householder with no husband present, and 29.7% were non-families. 24.1% of all households were made up of individuals, and 10.9% had someone living alone who was 65 years of age or older. The average household size was 2.50 and the average family size was 2.98.

In the town, the population was spread out, with 25.2% under the age of 18, 5.2% from 18 to 24, 25.4% from 25 to 44, 29.6% from 45 to 64, and 14.6% who were 65 years of age or older. The median age was 41 years. For every 100 females, there were 94.1 males. For every 100 females age 18 and over, there were 91.2 males.

The median income for a household in the town was $40,536, and the median income for a family was $45,368. Males had a median income of $31,473 versus $25,446 for females. The per capita income for the town was $19,223. About 6.6% of families and 8.6% of the population were below the poverty line, including 10.7% of those under age 18 and 4.7% of those age 65 or over.

== Communities and locations in Butternuts ==
- Church Corners – A location on the northern town line.
- Copes Corner – A hamlet southwest of Gilbertsville on NY-51, most noted for a county-owned campgrounds on the Butternut Creek, once site of a proposed flood control dam that would have flooded Gilbertsville and much of the valley.
- Filer Hill – An elevation east of Rootville.
- Freer Corner – A hamlet east of Gilbertsville near the eastern town line.
- Gilbertsville – The Village of Gilbertsville is located on NY-51. Listed on the historic register, it was formerly called "Butternuts."
- Heslops Corner – A hamlet northeast of Gilbertsville located at the junction of County Highways 4 and 8.
- Hugheston Corner – A location near the southeastern corner of the town.
- Mallory Corner – A location near the southern town line.
- Rootville -- A location southeast of Gilbertsville, located on County Highway 5, north of Wells Bridge, once a busy hamlet founded by Major Charles Root, a cheese manufacturer who operated many small factories around the region a century ago.
- Toll Corner – A hamlet east of Gilbertsville on County Highway 8.

== Notable people ==
- Winchel Bacon: abolitionist farmer and teacher who served in the Wisconsin State Assembly – farmed and taught in Butternuts, and married a local girl, before moving to Wisconsin
- Samuel B. Garvin: lawyer, judge, United States Attorney and New York County District Attorney – native of Butternuts
- Jared Comstock Gregory: mayor of Madison, Wisconsin and thrice Democratic nominee for Congressman – born in Butternuts
- Elisha Mills Huntington: lawyer, Indiana state legislator, state and federal judge, and Commissioner of the U.S. Land Office – native of Butternuts
- Isaac Van Duzen Reeve: United States Army officer who fought in the Seminole Wars, the Mexican–American War and the American Civil War, rising to brigadier general – born a native of Butternuts, New York
- Jesse C. Smith: lawyer, New York State Senator, and brigadier general who was a commander at the Battle of Gettysburg – native of Butternuts
- Joseph G. Thorp: lumberman and member of the Wisconsin State Senate – born in Butternuts
- E. C. Walker: lawyer, politician and University of Michigan regent in Michigan – native of Butternuts
