= Benninghofen House =

Historic house in Ohio, United States

- U.S. National Register of Historic Places
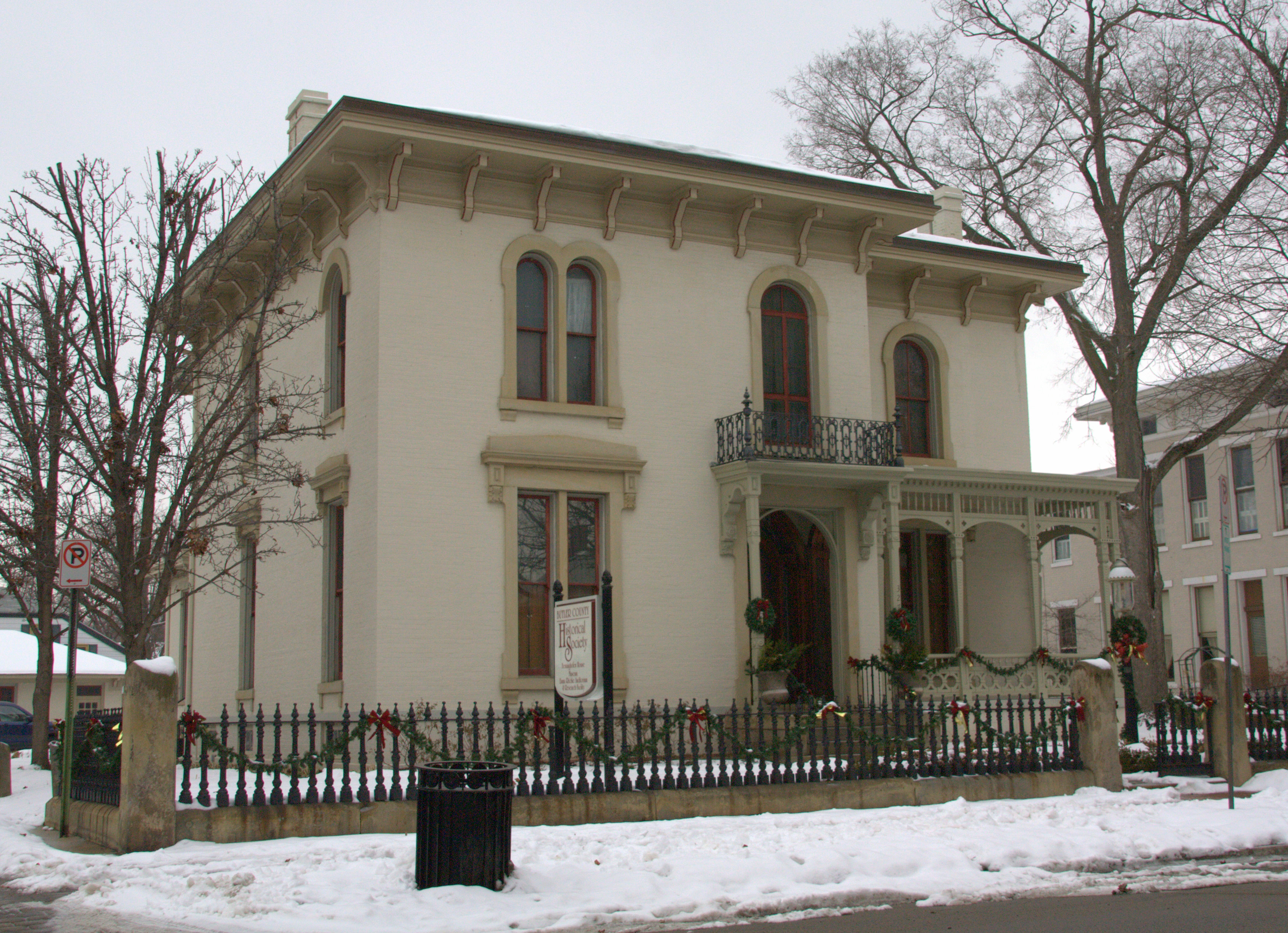
- Front and side of the house

- Location within Ohio Location within the United States
- Location: 327 N. 2nd St., Hamilton, Ohio
- Coordinates: 39°24′14″N 84°33′37″W
- Area: Less than 1 acre (0.40 ha)
- Built: 1862
- Architectural style: Italianate
- NRHP reference No.: 73001388
- Added to NRHP: May 17, 1973

The Benninghofen House is a historic residence located in Hamilton, Ohio, United States. Constructed in the 1860s, this house has been named a historic site for its high-quality architecture. Once the home of prominent Hamilton residents, it has been converted into a museum.

== History ==
Constructed in 1862, the house was built for Hamilton lawyer Noah C. McFarland, who became a politician and public servant a few years later: he was the senator for the district encompassing Butler and Warren Counties from 1866 to 1868, and from 1881 to 1885 he was the commissioner of the federal United States General Land Office. He only resided in the house for twelve years before selling it to John Benninghofen in 1874.

An immigrant from the German kingdom of Prussia, Benninghofen had established himself as a textile magnate in the 1850s, and by 1874 the firm of Benninghofen and Shuler had branched out into the paper-manufacturing business that later became a mainstay of the local economy.

Built of brick with iron elements, the Benninghofen House is a high-quality Italianate structure. Among the clearest examples of the style are the windows and front porch: the windows (some paired and some single) feature rounded arches, while the porch features small columns with decorative elements both at top and bottom.

Some of the windows (more on the side than on the front) are rectangular instead of rounded; some of these feature complicated lintel constructions instead of simple frames. Besides the "normal" porch surrounding the main entrance, the house includes a subsidiary second-story porch placed above the entrance to the main porch. The hip roof covering the house is supported on all sides by bracketing, which combines to form a decorative cornice. A metal fence with stone base separates the property from the sidewalk and street.

No longer a residence, the Butler County Historical Society maintains the Benninghofen House as a historic house museum. Some of the interior is maintained at its nineteenth-century appearance, although with minor changes such as the relocation of a painting from a hallway to the formal parlor. Other parts have been converted for unrelated museum purposes, such as the basement, which holds a display depicting dentist's tools from the nineteenth century. Yet other parts hold artifacts such as the Civil War battle flag of the 35th Ohio Infantry, which belonged to Hamilton resident Ferdinand Van Derveer.

In 1973, the Benninghofen House was added on the National Register of Historic Places, qualifying both because of its historic architecture and because of its connection to John Benninghofen. It is one of sixteen Hamilton locations on the Register, and one of more than eighty countywide.
