= Senator Tallman =

Senator Tallman may refer to:

- Clay Tallman (1874–1949), Nevada State Senate
- Peleg Tallman (1764–1840), Maine State Senate
