= Noah C. McFarland =

American politician

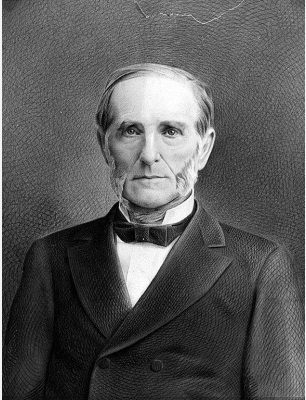
- charcoal drawing at National Portrait Gallery

22nd Commissioner of the General Land Office
- In office June 17, 1881 – March 26, 1885
- Preceded by: James A. Williamson
- Succeeded by: William A. J. Sparks

Personal details
- Born: April 23, 1822 Washington County, Pennsylvania, U.S.
- Died: April 26, 1897 (aged 75) Topeka, Kansas, U.S.
- Party: Republican
- Education: Washington College

Noah C. McFarland (April 23, 1822 – April 26, 1897) was a state senator in multiple U.S. states and was Commissioner of the United States General Land Office from 1881 to 1885.

== Biography ==
Noah C. McFarland was born in Washington County, Pennsylvania in 1822. He attended Washington College as a member of the class of 1844, but did not graduate. He moved to Bucyrus, Ohio in 1846, studied law, and was admitted to the bar. He moved to Hamilton, Ohio and practiced law; his house in Hamilton is still standing and has been named a historic site.

McFarland was elected to the Ohio State Senate in 1865. He then moved to Topeka, Kansas in 1870. He was elected to the Kansas State Senate, and was twice appointed a regent of the University of Kansas.

In 1881, McFarland was appointed Commissioner of the United States General Land Office, and served until 1885.

McFarland died at the Copeland Hotel, Topeka, Kansas on April 26, 1897.

Ohio Senate
Preceded by Andrew McBurney	Senator from 2nd District; 1866–1867	Succeeded by W. H. Campbell
Political offices
Preceded by James A. Williamson	Commissioner of the General Land Office; 1881–1885	Succeeded by William A. J. Sparks
