= Isaac Van Duzen Reeve =

United States Army officer (1813–1890)

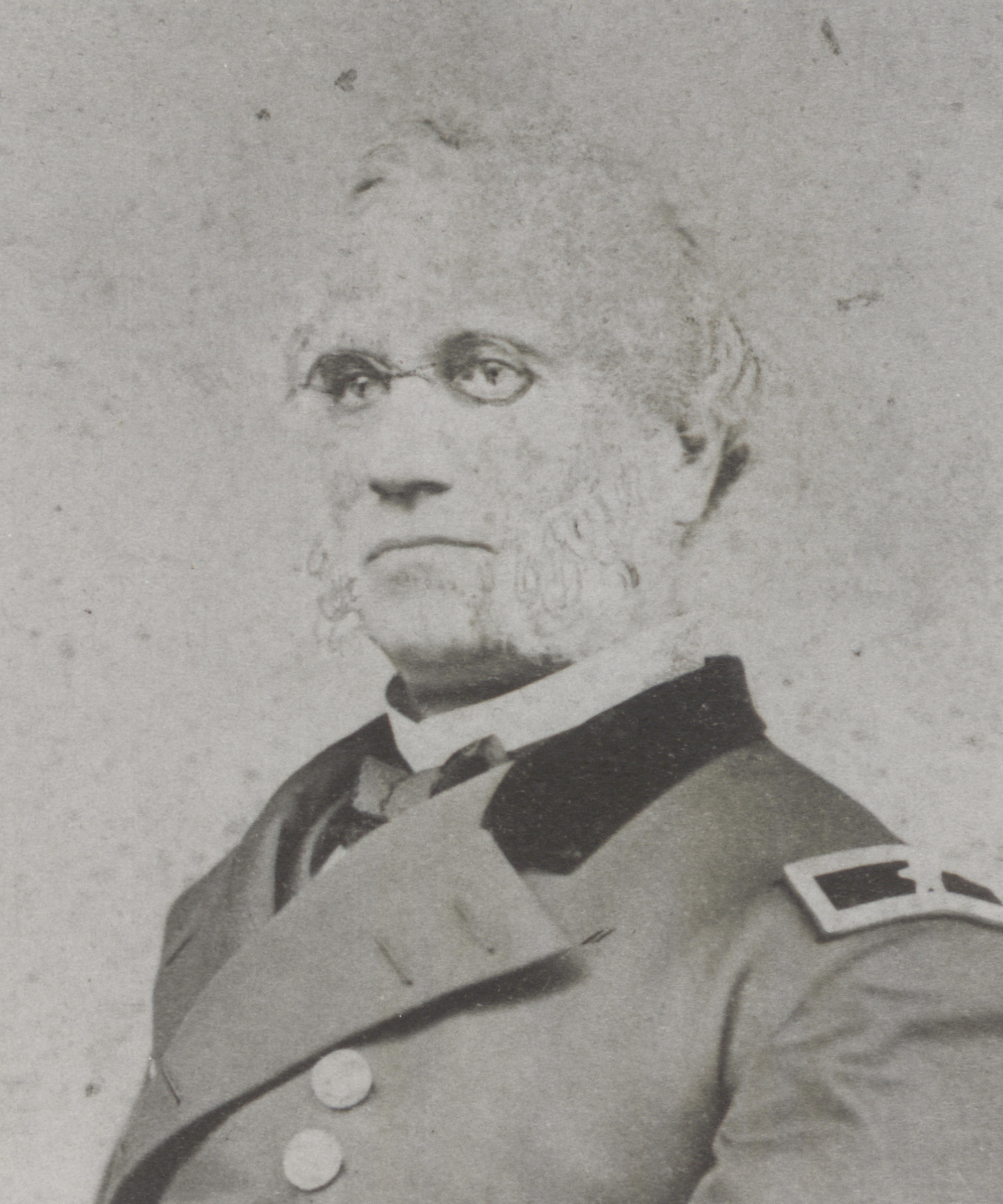
- Reeve as Colonel of the 13th U.S. Infantry Regiment c. 1864–1869
- Born: July 29, 1813; Butternuts, New York, U.S.
- Died: December 31, 1890 (aged 77); New York City, U.S.
- Burial place: Green Mount Cemetery, Dansville, Livingston County, New York
- Military career
- Allegiance: United States of America; Union
- Branch: United States Army; Union Army
- Service years: 1835–1871
- Rank: Colonel
- Conflicts: Second Seminole War; Mexican American War; Battle of Palo Alto; Battle of Resaca de la Palma; Siege of Veracruz; Battle of Cerro Gordo; Battle of Contreras; Battle of Churubusco; Battle of Molino del Rey; Battle of Chapultepec; American Civil War (POW)

Isaac Van Duzen Reeve (29 July 1813 – 31 December 1890) was a soldier in the United States Army during the 19th century. He rose to the rank of colonel, and retired a few years after his service in the American Civil War.

== Biography ==
Reeve was born on July 29, 1813, in Butternuts, New York.

Reeve graduated from the United States Military Academy in July 1835, and was initially assigned to the 4th Infantry. He was engaged in the Seminole Wars in 1836–1837 and in 1840–1842, transferring to the 8th Infantry in July 1838. Reeve served throughout the Mexican–American War, becoming captain in June 1846. He received the brevet of major in August 1847 and lieutenant colonel in September 1847 for gallant and meritorious service at Contreras, Churubusco, and Molino del Rey. Reeve commanded the expedition against the Pinal Apaches 1858–1859, but was made prisoner of war near San Antonio, Texas by Gen. David E. Twiggs on 9 May 1861. He was not exchanged until 20 August 1862, when he was promoted to major retroactive to 14 May 1861 and transferred to the 1st Infantry. Reeve was chief mustering and disbursing officer in New York City, 1862–1863, became lieutenant colonel in September 1862, and was in command of the draft rendezvous at Pittsburgh, Pennsylvania, 1864–1865. He became colonel of the 13th Infantry in October 1864, and was brevetted brigadier general in the U.S. Army, 13 March 1865, "for faithful and meritorious service during the civil war."

After the war, his regiment was based in Kansas and Montana. In January 1871, Reeve was retired at his own request. He died in New York City on 31 December 1890. Reeve was interred at Green Mount Cemetery in Dansville, Livingston County, New York.
