= Richard M. Young =

American judge (1798–1861)

Richard Montgomery Young
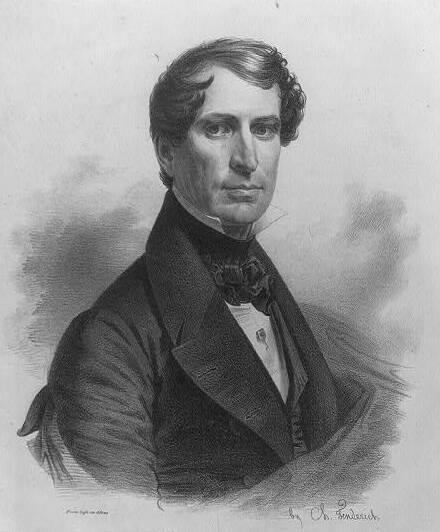

United States Senator from Illinois
- In office March 4, 1837 – March 3, 1843
- Preceded by: William Ewing
- Succeeded by: Sidney Breese

11th Commissioner of the General Land Office
- In office January 6, 1847 – June 30, 1849
- President: James K. Polk; Zachary Taylor
- Preceded by: James Shields
- Succeeded by: Justin Butterfield

Clerk of the United States House of Representatives
- In office 1850–1851
- Speaker: Howell Cobb
- Preceded by: Thomas J. Campbell
- Succeeded by: John W. Forney

Personal details
- Born: February 20, 1798 Fayette County, Kentucky, U.S.
- Died: November 28, 1861 (aged 63) Washington, D.C., U.S.
- Party: Democratic

Richard Montgomery Young (February 20, 1798 – November 28, 1861) was a U.S. Senator from Illinois.

Young was born in Fayette County, Kentucky and was admitted to the bar in 1816. In 1817, he moved his law practices to Jonesboro, Illinois, and was appointed a captain in the state militia. He served in the Illinois state house from 1820 to 1822 and as a circuit court judge from 1825 to 1837. He resigned his judgeship after being elected to the U.S. Senate in 1837 as a member of the Democratic Party. As a federal Senator, he served one six-year term; during the first four of his six years in office he was Chairman of the Senate Committee on Roads and Canals.

Upon the end of his term in the Senate, he was appointed to the Illinois Supreme Court (1843–1847) and then became a land office commissioner by appointment of James K. Polk. He served as the Clerk to the United States House of Representatives in 1850 and practiced law in Washington, D.C. from 1851 until his death.

Young was the presiding judge at the 1844 trial of the accused killers of Joseph Smith, the founder of the Latter Day Saint movement.

Young owned slaves.

U.S. Senate
Preceded by William L.D. Ewing	U.S. senator (Class 3) from Illinois; 1837–1843; Served alongside: John M. Robinson, Samuel McRoberts	Succeeded by Sidney Breese
Government offices
Preceded by James Shields	Commissioner of the General Land Office; 1847–1849	Succeeded by Justin Butterfield
Preceded by Thomas J. Campbell	Clerk of the United States House of Representatives; 1850–1851	Succeeded by John W. Forney
