= Fred Dennett =

American politician (1863–1928)

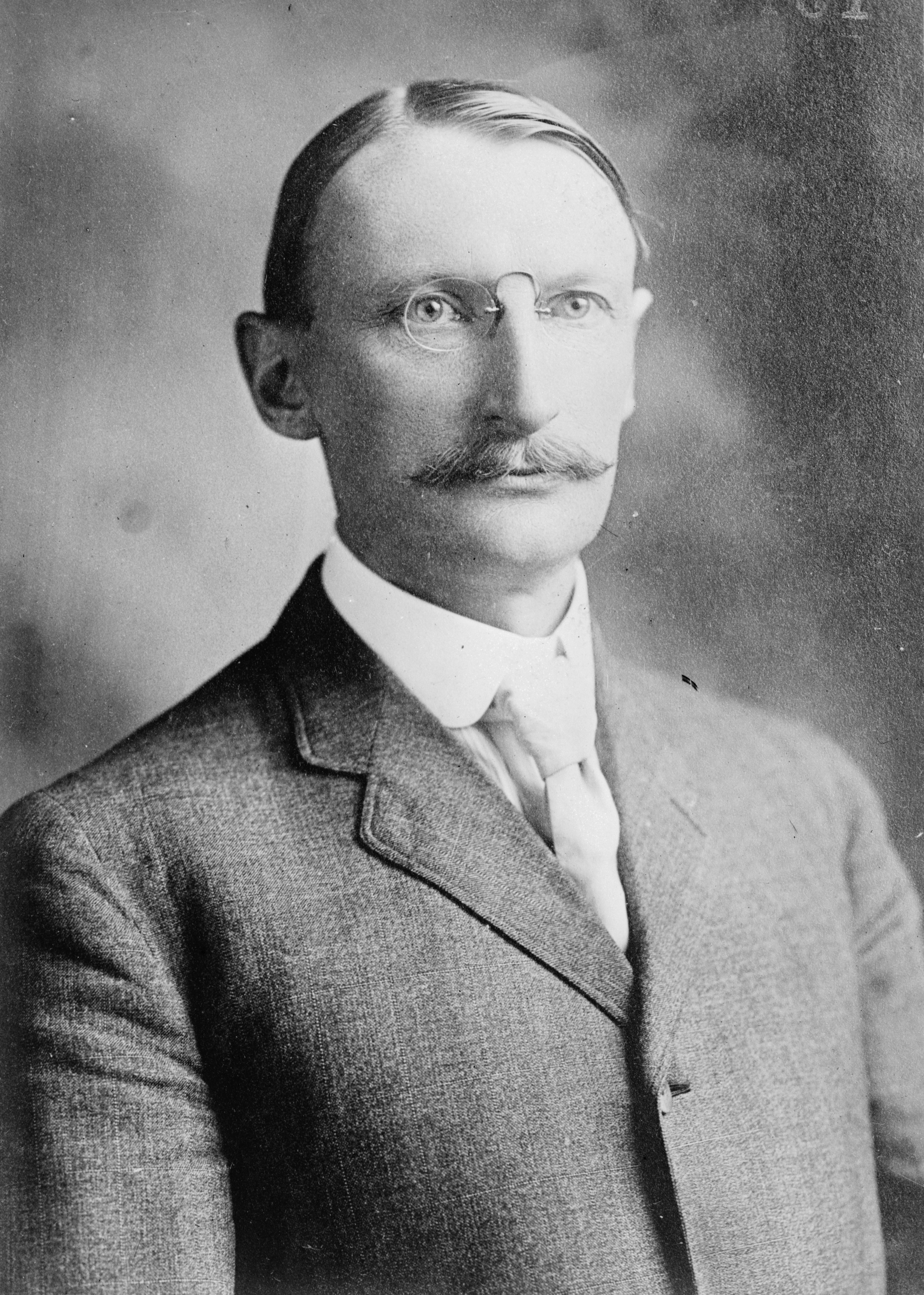

32nd Commissioner of the General Land Office
- In office January 14, 1908 – June 5, 1913
- President: Theodore Roosevelt; William Howard Taft; Woodrow Wilson
- Preceded by: Richard Achilles Ballinger
- Succeeded by: Clay Tallman

Personal details
- Born: June 27, 1863 Valparaiso, Chile
- Died: September 28, 1928 (aged 65) Washington, D.C., U.S.
- Resting place: Fort Lincoln Cemetery, Brentwood, Maryland
- Spouse: Elizabeth A. Comerford
- Education: George Washington University Law School

Fred Dennett (June 27, 1863 – September 28, 1928) was the 32nd Commissioner of the General Land Office from 1908 to 1913.

== Biography ==
Dennett was the son of Rev. D. Richard and Eleanor (Garforth) Dennett. He was born at Valparaiso, Chile on June 27, 1863. He was educated at Malvern College, Great Malvern, England. He was a graduate of George Washington University Law School with LL.B. in 1894 and LL.M. in 1896. Dennett married Elizabeth A. Comerford of Morris, Illinois, on November 23, 1892. He edited and part-owned the Milton, North Dakota Globe. He was a member of the North Dakota House of Representatives.

Dennet died September 28, 1928, at Washington, D.C., and is buried at Fort Lincoln Cemetery in Brentwood, Maryland.
