= John Wilson (American civil servant) =

American lawyer

John Wilson (1807 – January 10, 1876) was an immigrant from Ireland to the United States who held positions in the United States Department of the Treasury and United States Department of the Interior.

== Biography ==
John Wilson was born in Ireland and settled in the District of Columbia at an early age. He held a clerkship in the United States Post Office and United States Department of the Treasury. He was appointed Commissioner of the United States General Land Office in 1852, and held that office until 1855. He later practiced law in Chicago before returning to Washington to serve as Third Auditor of the Treasury, a post he held from 1864 to 1869.

Wilson remained in Washington to work as a claim agent and attorney. He died in Washington on January 10, 1876, at age 68, and was buried at Rock Creek Cemetery in Washington.

Wilson's brother, Joseph S. Wilson, also served as Commissioner of the General Land Office.

Wilson was the nephew of Congressman James Shields (1762–1831), and the cousin of Senator James Shields (1806–1879).

Political offices
Preceded by Justin Butterfield	Commissioner of the General Land Office; 1852–1855	Succeeded by Thomas A. Hendricks
Preceded by Elijah Sells	Third Auditor of the United States Treasury; 1864–1869	Succeeded by Reader W. Clarke
