= E. C. Walker =

American politician from Michigan

Edward Carey Walker
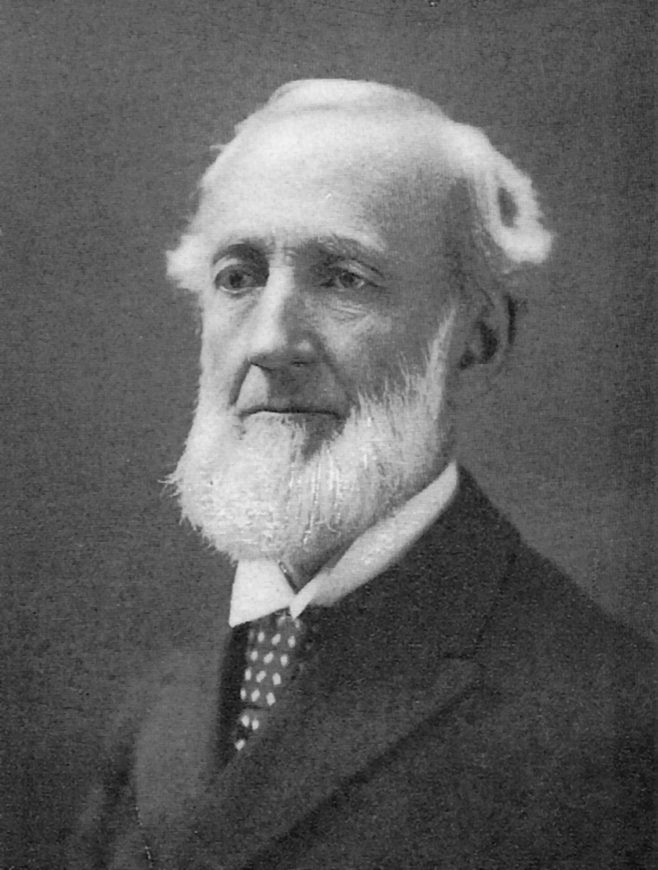

Chairman of the Michigan Republican Party
- In office 1861–1862
- Preceded by: James M. Edmunds
- Succeeded by: William Alanson Howard

Member of the Michigan House of Representatives
- In office January 1, 1867 – December 31, 1868

Regent of the University of Michigan
- In office 1864–1882
- Preceded by: Ebenezer Lakin Brown
- Succeeded by: James F. Joy

Personal details
- Born: July 4, 1820 Butternuts, New York, U.S.
- Died: December 28, 1894 (aged 74) Detroit, Michigan, U.S.
- Spouse: Lucy Bryant
- Children: Bryant Walker and Jessie Walker
- Education: University of Michigan Detroit Branch School; Yale University (BA 1841); Harvard Law School

Edward Carey Walker (July 4, 1820 – December 28, 1894) was a politician from the U. S. state of Michigan.

== Biography ==
Walker was born to Stephen and Lydia (Gardner) Walker in Butternuts, New York, and prepared for college at Hamilton Academy. At the age of fifteen, he left his studies and joined an engineering corps engaged in building the Chenango Canal, under the charge of William J. McAlpine. After two years' service he suffered a broken knee when thrown from a carriage, which prevented him from continuing his profession. He later studied at a branch of the University of Michigan then at Detroit, became Chaplain in the United States Army and in 1840 studied at Yale, graduating in 1842.

Walker returned to Detroit, taught school at the university and then began the study of law in the office of Joy & Parker. He then studied for a year under Judge Story at Harvard and was admitted to the bar in 1845. He returned to Detroit to practice law and in 1850 practiced with his brother Charles I. Walker under C. I. & E. C. Walker. On June 16, 1852, he married Lucy Bryant of Buffalo, New York and they had two children, Bryant and Jessie. In 1854, he was present in Jackson, Michigan, when the Republican Party was formed. In 1857, when his brother retired, he was then associated with Charles A. Kent for fifteen years under the name of Walker & Kent in 1862. Then he practiced with his only son, Bryant, under the name Walker & Walker. He was also, for many years, member and Secretary of the Board of Education of Detroit.

Walker served as Chairman of the Republican State Central Committee from 1861-62. In 1863, he was elected to serve as regent of the University of Michigan being re-elected twice. Also in 1863, during the American Civil War, he was very charitable towards the Union cause, serving as Chairman of the Michigan Branch of the United States Christian Commission which sent delegate to the hospitals and fields. He also served in the Michigan House of Representatives in 1867 as Chairman of the Judiciary Committee.

E. C. Walker continued to practice law until his death in 1894. His son resumed the practice under Walker & Spalding.

The attribution of the song "I like cigars beneath the stars" by an "E. C. Walker" to the poem by Ella Wheeler Wilcox to the politician is probably mistaken.

== Additional sources ==
- Bingham, Stephen D. (2005) [1915]. "s.v. Bryant Walker". History of Michigan. Ann Arbor, Mich.: University of Michigan Library. pp. 679–680.
- Farmer, Silas (2005) [1890]. "s.v. Edward Carey Walker". History of Detroit and Wayne County and early Michigan. Ann Arbor, Mich.: University of Michigan Library. pp. 1129–1130.
- Moore, Charles (2005) [1878]. "s.v. Walker, Hon. Edward Carey". American biographical history of eminent and self-made men…Michigan volume. Ann Arbor, Mich.: University of Michigan Library. pp. 146–147.
- Palmer, Friend; Hunt, Harry P.; June, Charles Mills (1906). Early days in Detroit; papers written by General Friend Palmer of Detroit, being his personal reminiscences of important events and descriptions of the city for over eighty years. Hunt & June. OCLC 1361237087.
