= Winchel Bacon =

19th century American politician

W. D. Bacon
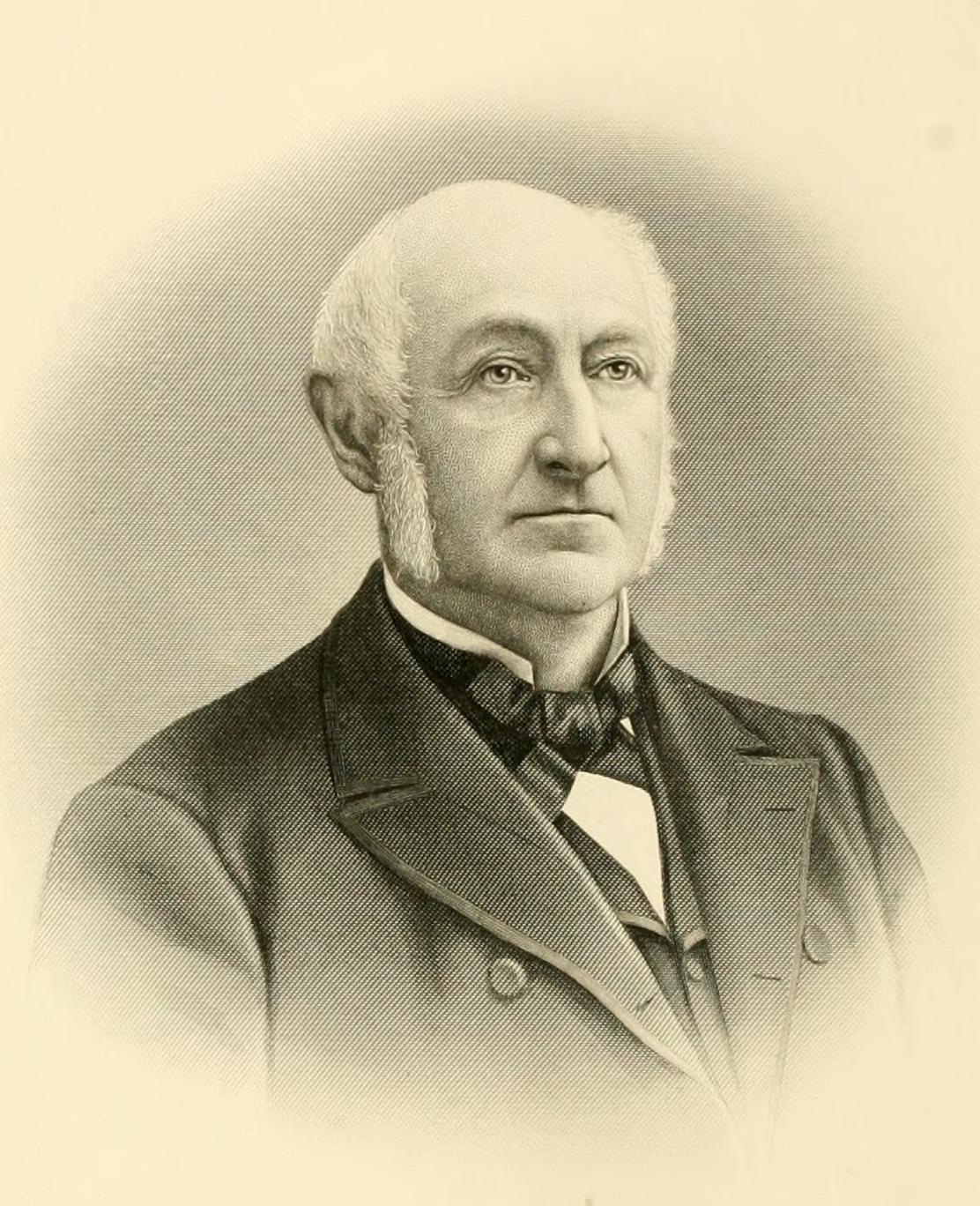
- Portrait from Portrait and Biographical Record of Waukesha County, Wisconsin (1894)

Member of the Wisconsin State Assembly from the Waukesha 4th district
- In office January 3, 1853 – January 2, 1854
- Preceded by: Publius V. Monroe
- Succeeded by: Jesse Smith

Personal details
- Born: August 21, 1816 Stillwater, New York, U.S.
- Died: March 20, 1894 (aged 77) Waukesha, Wisconsin, U.S.
- Resting place: Prairie Home Cemetery, Waukesha, Wisconsin
- Party: Republican; Free Soil (before 1854); Liberty (before 1849)
- Spouse: Delia Blackwell (m. 1838; died 1880)
- Children: Joshua Edgar Bacon; (1848–1929)
- Occupation: Farmer

Winchel Dailey Bacon (August 21, 1816 – March 20, 1894) was an American farmer, abolitionist activist, and Wisconsin pioneer. He was a prominent Baptist layman in Waukesha, Wisconsin, and represented Waukesha for one term in the Wisconsin State Assembly.

== Background ==
Bacon was born August 21, 1816, in Stillwater, New York, son of Samuel and Lydia Barber Dailey Bacon. He worked as a clerk in Troy, New York, for a couple of years. In 1836 he was baptized in the Unadilla River by Elder Jabez Swan; he would remain a lifelong Baptist.

He joined his parents in their 1837 move to Butternuts, New York. On July 4, 1838, he married Delia Blackwell, a native of Butternuts. For four years he farmed in Butternuts, teaching school in the winters. On September 2, 1841, the couple left for the west, going by canal from Utica to Buffalo, New York, by steamer from thence to Milwaukee in the Wisconsin Territory, and west from there to what was then called "Prairieville" (now Waukesha), where they would settle for the rest of their lives.

== In Wisconsin ==
Bacon farmed (as he would for the rest of his active life), and taught school, primarily in the winter, through 1844. From 1843, he engaged in the wagon-making and blacksmithing business, in partnership with either his brother-in-law Charles Blackwell or one Edmund Clinton. About 1850 he traded the shop he'd built in Waukesha for a steam-powered sawmill in Brookfield.

== Politics and public office ==
Originally a Whig, Bacon was active in organizing the Liberty Party and then the Free Soil Party in Wisconsin. In 1852, he was elected to a single term in the Assembly from Waukesha as a Free Soiler. He was on the commission that selected a location for a reform school; with his influence, this was sited in Waukesha County, becoming the Wisconsin Industrial School for Boys. He served as its acting director, and supervised the erection of its first buildings. For years he was a trustee of the Wisconsin Hospital for the Insane, and was then appointed a trustee of the Asylum for the Deaf and Dumb.

He also held various local offices, including school board member and president of the village board,

Bacon was an abolitionist, and active in the Underground Railroad; it was at his home that fugitive slave Joshua Glover was sheltered on the first night after he had been broken out of jail in Milwaukee in 1854. He became active in the Republican Party after it was founded in Wisconsin, publishing the Waukesha Republican, a campaign newspaper, for three months in 1856 which was credited with raising the Republican margins sufficiently to ensure the election of John F. Potter to Congress.

In June 1861, after the outbreak of the American Civil War, Bacon (who was already chairman of the county's "Central War Committee" to organize and coordinate war efforts) was commissioned by Governor Randall to make purchases of military supplies in New York for Wisconsin (supplies in Wisconsin had been exhausted), a task he completed on time and under budget. On February 26, 1863, Bacon was appointed by President Abraham Lincoln as a paymaster for the United States Army, with the rank of major. He served a while in St. Louis, Missouri, but resigned, as he said that his business interests required that he return to Wisconsin (a recurrent theme throughout his career; he felt that he could not spend more than a few days away from his business[es]).

== Personal, religious and civic activities ==
Bacon was a teetotaler, and a strong advocate of the temperance movement. He was active in the Baptist church, and served at a trustee of several Baptist-affiliated organizations, including the University of Chicago and Wayland Academy, as well as Carroll College, where he also taught for three terms. He was a long-time supporter of evangelist Dwight L. Moody. He was an active Mason.

From his first arrival in Prairieville to the final illness which confined him to his home, Bacon never ceased work as a farmer; in 1853, he won prizes at the Wisconsin State Fair in the farming implements category. Between 1861 and 1871 he was several times elected President of the Waukesha County Agricultural Society, whose charter he had helped write in 1856. He held shares in the Waukesha County Bank, and from 1865 to 1868 served as president of the Farmers' Nation Bank in Waukesha, of which he was majority shareholder. It was liquidated in 1868, not because of lack of success, but because Bacon needed the capital for other purposes.

He and Delia (Blackwood) Bacon had five children, of whom three lived to adulthood. She died February 12, 1880. On September 15, 1883, he married Clara Campbell, of Muncy, Pennsylvania.

He died March 20, 1894, at his home in Waukesha, after a lingering illness of more than three years' duration, and was buried in that city which had grown up around him.

When Bacon's old house in downtown Waukesha was demolished in 1956 to build a parking lot, workers discovered gravestones of the two Bacon children who had died in infancy, Samuel and Winchel Jr.
