= Joseph S. Wilson =

16th & 18th Commissioner of the General Land Office
- In office February 23, 1860 – March 16, 1861
- Preceded by: Samuel Axley Smith
- Succeeded by: James M. Edmunds
- In office September 1, 1866 – February 4, 1871
- Preceded by: James M. Edmunds
- Succeeded by: Willis Drummond

Personal details
- Born: Ireland
- Died: June 23, 1874 Washington, D.C., U.S.

Joseph Shields Wilson (died June 23, 1874) was an immigrant from Ireland to the United States who held positions in the United States Department of the Treasury and United States Department of the Interior.

== Biography ==
Joseph Shields Wilson was born in Ireland circa 1806 and settled in the District of Columbia at an early age. He became a Messenger in the Department of the Treasury, and then a clerk. With the organization of the Department of the Interior in 1849, he became Chief Clerk of the United States General Land Office. He was appointed Commissioner of the General Land Office 1860–1861 and then again 1866–1871. His brother, John Wilson, was also commissioner.

Wilson died in Washington, D.C., on June 23, 1874.

== Personal ==
Wilson was the nephew of Congressman James Shields (1762–1831), and the cousin of Senator James Shields (1806–1879).

Wilson married Eliza Uhler Moulder in 1829. Their oldest child Mary Shields Wilson became the wife of Brevet Brig. Gen. Thomas Duncan. Their second child was Brevet Brig. Gen. Thomas Wilson, a 1853 United States Military Academy graduate who served as Chief Commissary of Subsistence for the Army of the Potomac, and their third child was Brig. Gen. John Moulder Wilson, a 1860 West Point graduate and Medal of Honor recipient.

Political offices
Preceded by Samuel Axley Smith	Commissioner of the General Land Office; 1860–1861	Succeeded by James M. Edmunds
Preceded by James M. Edmunds	Commissioner of the General Land Office; 1866–1871	Succeeded by Willis Drummond
