= Samuel Axley Smith =

American politician (1822–1863)

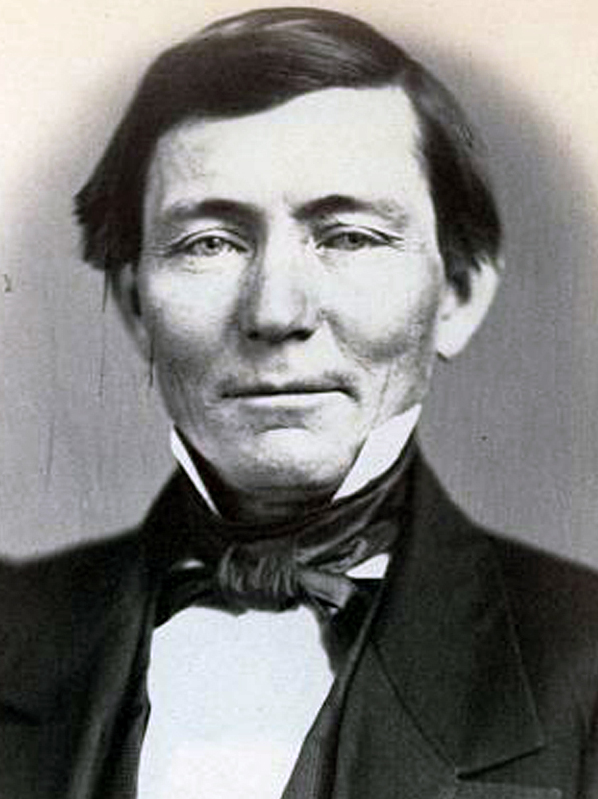

Member of the U.S. House of Representatives from Tennessee's 3rd district
- In office March 4, 1853 – March 3, 1859
- Preceded by: William M. Churchwell
- Succeeded by: Reese B. Brabson

Personal details
- Born: June 26, 1822 Monroe County, Tennessee, U.S.
- Died: November 25, 1863 (aged 41) Ladd Springs, Tennessee, U.S.
- Party: Democratic
- Spouses: Lea Henderson Smith; Martha E Mccarty Smith
- Children: William Smith; John Lea Smith
- Profession: lawyer; politician; land agent

Samuel Axley Smith (June 26, 1822 – November 25, 1863) was an American politician and a member of the United States House of Representatives for the 3rd congressional district of Tennessee.

== Biography ==
Smith was born in Monroe County, Tennessee on June 26, 1822. He was the younger brother of Colonel M. Whit Smith (b. Oct. 7, 1814), prominent lawyer, politician and Confederate officer from Florida. Smith received a limited education, taught school, and studied law. He was admitted to the bar in 1845 and commenced practice in Cleveland, Tennessee. He married Martha E McCarty in 1846 and they had two children, William and John Lea. Smith later married Lavinia W. Henderson, daughter of Hon. Luke Lea, U. S. Representative for Tennessee, in 1855.

Notably, his grandson W.P Smith became an attorney and mayor of Miami, Fl.

== Career ==
From 1845 to 1848, Smith was a District Attorney General for the city of Chattanooga, TN. He was a delegate to the Democratic National Convention in 1848.

Smith was elected as a Democrat to the Thirty-third, Thirty-fourth, and Thirty-fifth Congresses. He served from March 4, 1853, to March 3, 1859. He was an unsuccessful candidate for renomination in 1858 to the Thirty-sixth Congress.

Appointed by President Buchanan to be Commissioner of the United States General Land Office, Smith served from January 18 to February 12, 1860, when he resigned. On November 16, 1861, he was appointed by the governor of Tennessee to be an agent to collect arms for the Confederate Army.

== Death ==
Smith died at Ladd Springs, Tennessee in Polk County on November 25, 1863 (age 41 years, 152 days). He is interred at Amos Ladd's Burial Ground, Ladd Springs, Tennessee.

U.S. House of Representatives
Preceded by Josiah M. Anderson	Member of the U.S. House of Representatives from Tennessee's 3rd congressional district 1853–1859	Succeeded by Reese B. Brabson
Government offices
Preceded by Thomas A. Hendricks	Commissioner of the General Land Office; 1859–1860	Succeeded by Joseph S. Wilson
