= Justin Butterfield =

American politician (1790–1855)

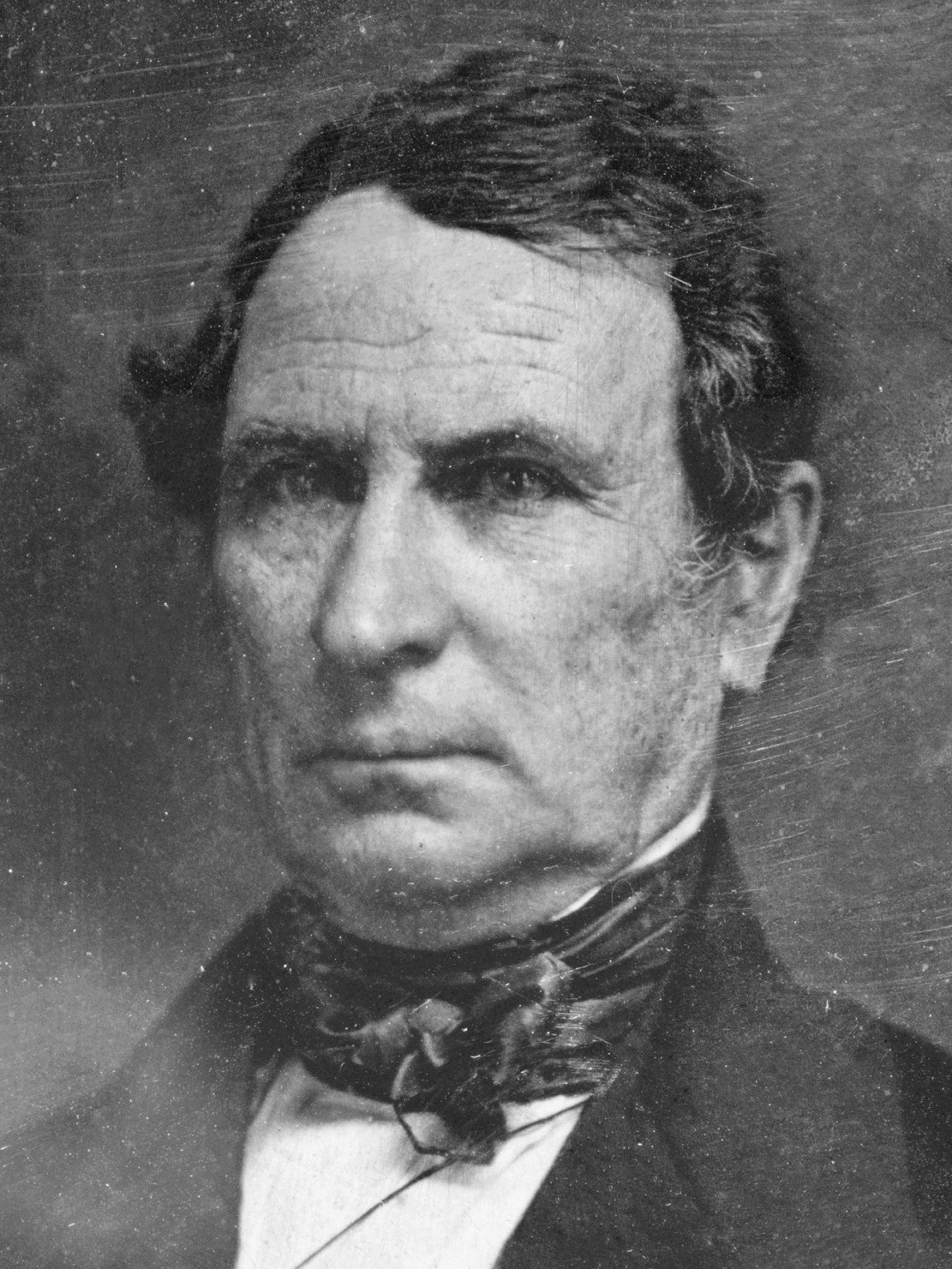
- Justin Butterfield by Mathew Brady

12th Commissioner of the General Land Office
- In office June 21, 1849 – September 15, 1852
- President: Zachary Taylor
- Preceded by: Richard M. Young
- Succeeded by: John Wilson

Personal details
- Born: 1790 Keene, New Hampshire, US
- Died: October 23, 1855 (aged 64–65) Chicago, Illinois, US
- Resting place: Graceland Cemetery
- Party: Whig
- Spouse: Elizabeth Pearce
- Children: eight
- Education: Williams College
- Occupation: lawyer
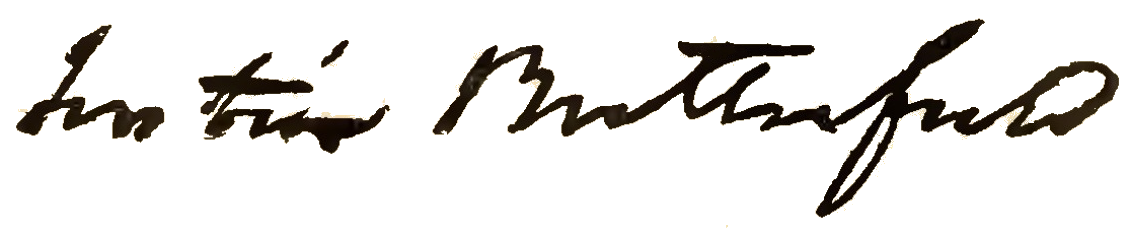
- Signature

Justin Butterfield (1790 – October 23, 1855) served in 1849–1852 as commissioner of the General Land Office of the United States. Appointed to this position in 1849 by the incoming Zachary Taylor administration, he is best known for having faced down, and defeated, another Whig candidate for the same job, Abraham Lincoln. In the General Land Office, he was one of the leading adopters of the railroad land grant system for financing the construction of long-distance railroad infrastructure throughout the United States. He was also one of the foremost Gentile defenders of the rights of the Church of Jesus Christ of Latter Day Saints in Illinois during the final period of Joseph Smith's leadership at Nauvoo.

== Biography ==
Justin Butterfield was born in Keene, New Hampshire in 1790. He entered Williams College at age seventeen; a work-study student, he simultaneously studied college-level courses and served as a schoolteacher, as was allowed by the laws of that day. Upon completion of his studies he removed to Watertown, New York, where he read law in the office of Egbert Ten Eyck. At age 22 he was admitted to the bar, and practiced in Adams, New York; New Orleans; and Watertown. He also married Elizabeth Butterfield née Pearce (1795–1863) of Schoharie, New York, and the couple had eight children. As a New York State attorney, Butterfield was a strong defender of civil liberties, acting for two defendants sued in separate cases of libel. Butterfield argued both cases before juries with separate defenses of the principle of freedom of speech. In 1835 the now middle-aged lawyer visited and established a practice with James H. Collins in the fast-growing frontier village of Chicago, and by 1837 he completed his casework in upstate New York.

Butterfield had a colorful practice in New York. During the War of 1812, he obtained a writ of habeas corpus for his client, who was suspected of communicating with the enemy in Canada. He served the writ on the commanding general who was holding his client. The general evaded compliance, and Butterfield was branded as disloyal by the public. During the Mexican–American War he was asked if he opposed that war, replying "No, Sir! I oppose no war; I opposed one once and it ruined me. Henceforth I'm for war, pestilence, and famine!"

=== Illinois lawyer ===
Butterfield became one of the pioneer attorneys of Chicago at a time when the village at the foot of Lake Michigan was beginning to establish its supremacy over all of the other settlements of the American Midwest. A legal history of Illinois describes Butterfield as "one of the greatest lawyers of his time" and refers to the partnership of Butterfield & Collins, formed in 1835, as a firm of "very high rank, not only in the city of Chicago, but across the state." He was one of the trustees of Rush Medical College at its incorporation in 1837. In 1841 he was named United States Attorney for the District of Illinois

Butterfield practiced with Collins in 1835–1843, and then with Erastus S. Williams in 1843–1849. He played a key role in helping Illinois businesses, and the State as a whole, work out from under the effects of the Panic of 1837. Specializing in debt restructuring, he and close associates developed legal language in 1843 to refinance the Illinois and Michigan Canal, a work of such magnitude that it had helped to drive the state of Illinois into default. By pledging to Eastern capital the half-excavated canal and much public land owned by the state, Butterfield obtained an emergency loan of $1.6 million, with which a shallow canal could be dug out and completed from Chicago to La Salle, Illinois. Although Illinois taxpayers achieved a less-than-optimal resolution of the state's difficulties, the deal helped Butterfield establish enduring connections with New York bankers.

Butterfield also practiced criminal law. In summer 1843, Joseph Smith, the head of the Church of Jesus Christ of Latter Day Saints, asked Butterfield to defend him in federal court. The Nauvoo leader had been arrested by Missouri peace officers on a variety of charges related to the Mormons' time in that state some years earlier; in order to avoid extradition and possible lynching, Butterfield asked a federal court sitting in Illinois to grant habeas corpus to Smith. When Judge Nathaniel Pope granted this motion, Smith and his lawyer made a spectacular appearance in a Springfield, Illinois courtroom. Unrepentantly admitting to Judge Pope that his client was a fugitive, Butterfield proclaimed the supremacy of federal law over state law (a contested legal doctrine in 1843) and stated that he and his client had appeared in federal court to "plead for liberty, personal freedom, secured to every citizen in this broad land by the Constitution of the United States." During the trial, the gallery had a large number of women. Butterfield's witty opening statement was "May it please your Honor, I appear before the Pope, in the presence of angels, to defend the Prophet of the Lord!"

Although Judge Pope issued a decision on the lines suggested by counsel Butterfield and released Smith upon these terms, the Mormon leader and his close associates began to realize that they could not practice their faith within the boundaries of any of the existing states of the United States. Only the federal government could grant the Latter-Day Saints the space they needed to continue to develop their church. After Smith was killed in June 1844, Brigham Young led most of the surviving Mormons westward towards Utah. Although a Gentile, Butterfield's legal advocacy had played a role in the history of the Latter-Day Saints.

=== General Land Office ===
By 1849 Justin Butterfield was a Chicago attorney with strong national connections throughout the then-dominant Whig Party. In November 1848, the Whigs elected Zachary Taylor to the White House, and now had the pleasant task of selecting loyal party political figures to the high-ranking positions of the incoming Taylor administration.

Next to seats in Taylor's cabinet, one of the highest-ranking patronage plums available to the triumphant Whigs was that of Commissioner (chief operating officer) of the U.S. General Land Office, the agency responsible for accounting for and selling public lands on the American frontier. The General Land Office hired surveyors to map the lands for sale, and appointed local land agents to operate regional land sale offices. In addition, the position of the General Land Office at the fulcrum of what was then the American real estate business meant that its commissioner had the opportunity of developing many ties with East Coast banking interests that could serve each public servant well when the time came for him to retire to private life. Furthermore, the commissioner was paid the then-substantial salary of $3,000 per year.

The Whig Party inner circles doled out key administration positions to political applicants by state, and it became known in early 1849 that the post of General Land Office commissioner would be awarded to a Whig from Illinois to be named later. At least four candidates, including Butterfield, Cyrus Edwards, Lincoln, and J.L.D. "Don" Morrison mounted substantial campaigns for the position. In addition, Lincoln claimed in his correspondence that he estimated that at least 300 Illinois Whigs had taken at least preliminary steps to apply for the attractive job. The Springfield lawyer attacked Butterfield for being one of the least-partisan applicants, with among the weakest ties to the Whig Party. The Chicagoan's performance in office would confirm this judgment. On May 16, 1849, Lincoln wrote to Secretary of the Navy William B. Preston "When you and I were almost sweating blood to have Genl. Taylor nominated, this same man was ridiculing the idea…If (Butterfield) went out of the city of Chicago to aid in (Taylor's) election, it is more than I ever heard, or believe."

While Lincoln's friends at first believed that he had the inside track for the appointment, the result was a disappointment. At the same time as Illinois Whigs were competing for the commissionership, the 30th Congress was creating the new United States Department of the Interior, and folding the Land Office into the newly created department. Taylor's choice for Interior Secretary, Ohio's Thomas Ewing, aggressively favored Butterfield for the position, and his wishes prevailed. Scholars have found pro-Butterfield letters of recommendation in federal files from prominent national Whigs such as Henry Clay and the Chicago lawyer's personal friend Daniel Webster, while similar letters written and signed by congressmen on Lincoln's behalf disappeared from the same files, never to be seen again. Butterfield, appointed in July 1849, would head the Land Office for three years.

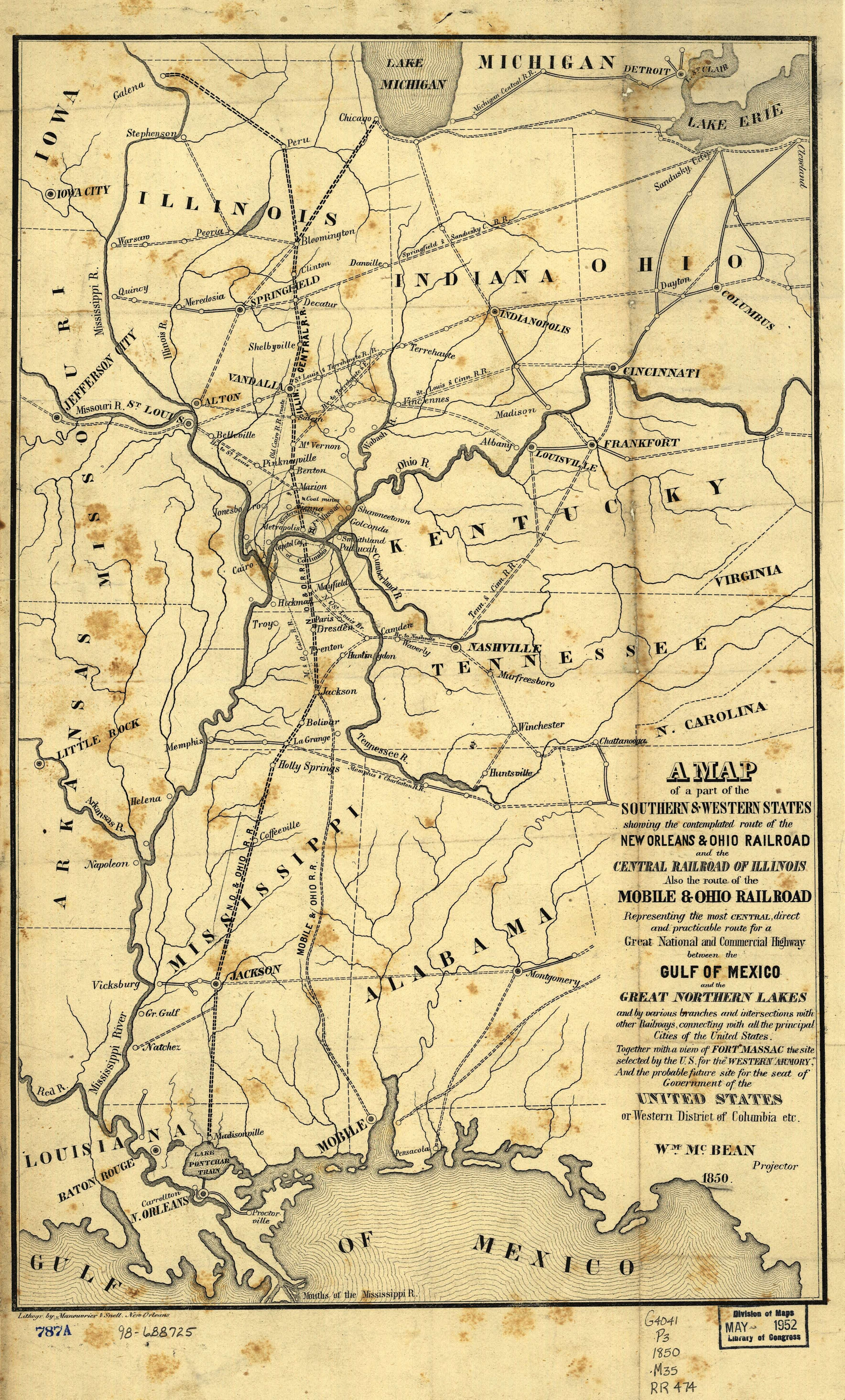
Illinois Central 1850 route map

=== Railroad land grants ===
Butterfield's connections played a role in 1849–1852 as the General Land Office made one of the key policy moves in the history of U.S. public lands. During the 1840s planning had commenced for the construction of the Illinois Central Railroad. The state of Illinois, which had little capital of its own, needed to raise funds for the construction of a trunk railroad line to span the state from Chicago to Cairo, Illinois. Butterfield's fellow Illinoisan Stephen A. Douglas, a Democrat elected to Congress in 1842, became the leader in this effort.

Although Butterfield was a Whig officeholder nominally opposed to Douglas, his cross-party ties made it possible for the political appointee to develop a subterranean alliance with the Democratic senator. Butterfield and Douglas, working together, adopted the "checkerboard" system, previously used for canal land grants, by which a strip of unsold United States public lands under the control of the General Land Office could be marked off in alternate squares. By re-conceptualizing this system for railroad development, strips of land could be drawn so as to lay over, along, and on both sides of the proposed right-of-way of a politically favored railroad. Alternate sections of public land were then granted to the railroad planners as a construction subsidy. The system was self-incentivizing; the land grants were almost worthless to the railroad and its builders unless they actually built the railway that was to serve the real properties contained within the grants. Under the Butterfield-Douglas system, the General Land Office temporarily retained fifty percent of the real property within each land grant strip; but these sections were retained subject to the understanding that the railroad construction would open these sections for settlement and frontier farmers would eagerly buy them up when the time came. The negative side of these transactions was that the public purse received minimal recompense for the transfer of real estate that could soon see sharp increases in value. Concluded critic George Draffan: "The unfortunate checkerboard pattern of the land grants had begun during the canal land grant era, and continued with the railroad grants as a concession to opponents both of land subsidies and of interstate railroads."

The adoption of the Butterfield-Douglas system made it possible, in late 1850, to unsnarl the forces that blocked construction of the railroad. The Whig executive Butterfield, the Democratic senator Douglas, and the Whig president Millard Fillmore found themselves working together. The 31st Congress enacted the Douglas bill to grant alternate sections of land to the new Illinois Central railroad, and the new railroad was chartered by the state of Illinois in February 1851. Butterfield's banking connections had helped make it possible to craft a deal that would enable the fledgling venture to monetize the land grants and raise the necessary capital; the railroad's construction was swift, with rail-laying starting December 1851 and the work concluding in September 1856. The system presaged other land grants that would be integral to building later western railway projects and opening the American Frontier.

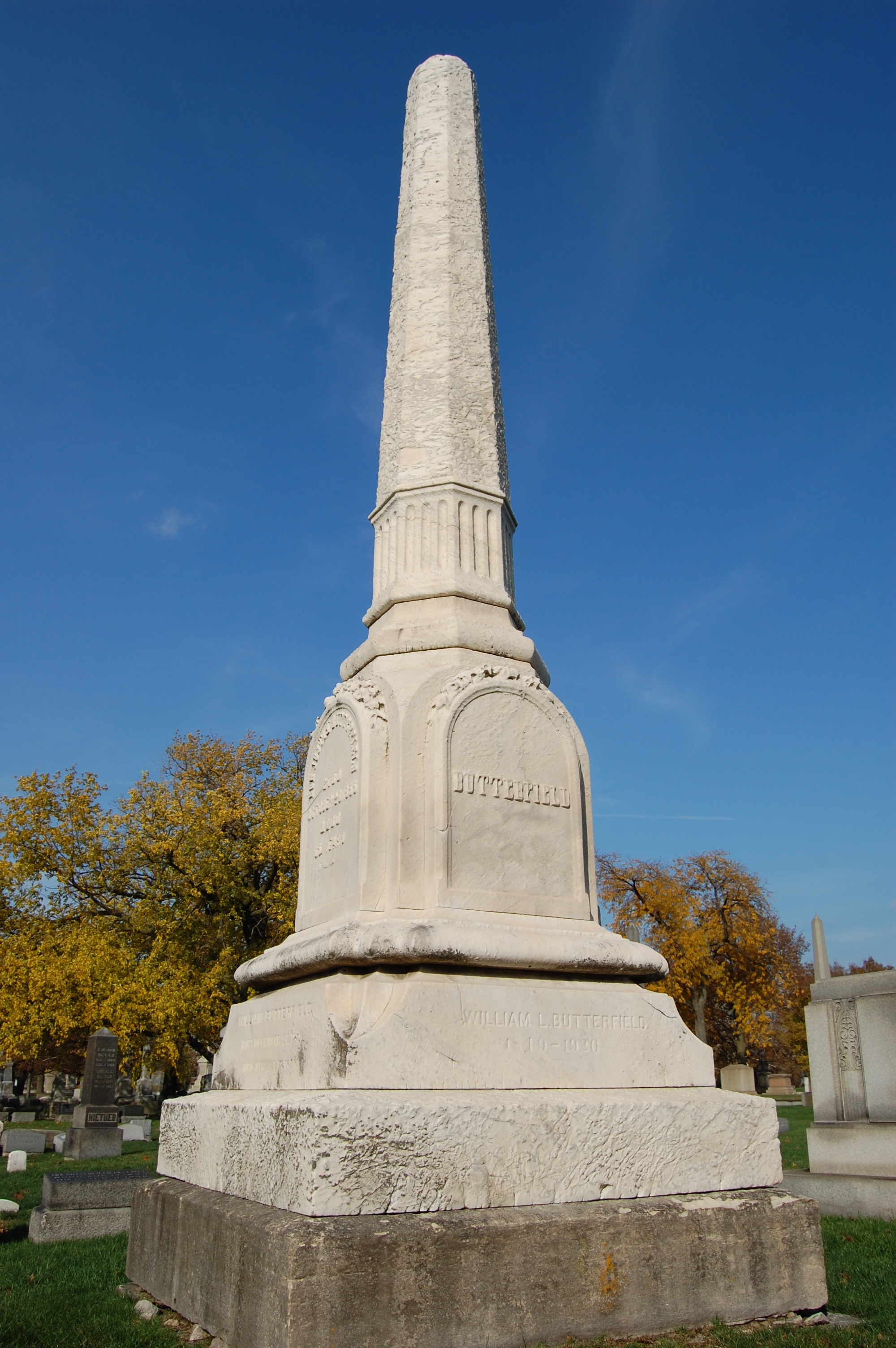
Justin Butterfield tombstone

=== Illness, death, and legacy ===
At the height of his career, Butterfield was permanently disabled by a stroke. With the Whigs soon to leave power, he laid down his commissionership in 1852 and was replaced, in September of that year, by the nonpartisan John Wilson. Butterfield, the last Whig to serve as Land Office commissioner, returned enfeebled to Chicago. He did not resume the practice of law, and never again enjoyed good health, dying in Chicago on October 23, 1855.

Ironically, only six years after Butterfield's death the railroad he helped to organize, the Illinois Central, played a key role in the mobilization of Union forces against Southern Confederate armies stationed in western Kentucky and Tennessee. These Union forces operated under the commander-in-chief powers wielded by Abraham Lincoln, the Illinois lawyer Butterfield had once defeated. Mr. Lincoln also signed a series of bills, starting in July 1862, that utilized the checkerboard land-grant system invented by his two political adversaries, Butterfield and Douglas, to construct the First transcontinental railroad.

Butterfield reinvested much of his legal fees in Chicago real estate, and left wealth to his family. His daughter, Elizabeth Butterfield Sawyer, and his granddaughter Ada Sawyer Garrett subdivided a family estate to develop what became Chicago's Logan Square neighborhood.

His remains were originally interred in a vault at City Cemetery, and were moved and reinterred on May 31, 1871, at Graceland Cemetery in Chicago. (Note: This was part of a larger relocation of the cemetery (which was not completely successful, as many bodies were left in place) and which also included remains of 4,000 Confederate prisoners of war. However, all visible remnants of the cemetery were removed, excepting the Couch tomb, which is probably the oldest extant structure in the affected area of the City, everything else having been destroyed by the Great Chicago Fire. Bannos, Pamela (2012). "Hidden truths: Visualizing the City Cemetery". The Chicago Cemetery & Lincoln Park. Northwestern University.. Bannos, Pamela (2012). "The Couch Tomb — Hidden truths: Visualizing the City Cemetery". The Chicago Cemetery & Lincoln Park. Northwestern University. See Graceland Cemetery. See Chicago Water Tower, which has often been said to be the oldest structure in the area.)

A pamphlet biography of the pioneer lawyer was published in Chicago in 1880. In 1908, Garrett presented a portrait of her grandfather to the Chicago Historical Society.

Butterfield's 1843 defense of Joseph Smith remained a key case in U.S. legal history as of 2013. The Abraham Lincoln Presidential Library announced plans in July 2013 to hold a Springfield, Illinois re-enactment of the trial on September 24, 2013, with a discussion of the habeas corpus principles Butterfield had defended in court.
