= Ada Sawyer Garrett =

19th-century American socialite

Ada Sawyer Garrett (1856–1938) was a late 19th-century Chicago socialite.

== Early years ==
The daughter of Dr. Sidney Sawyer and the former Elizabeth Butterfield, Ada was a popular society debutante. She married T. Mauro Garrett, a railroad official. She and her mother subdivided 80 acres (320,000 m^{2}) of land on the Northwest Side of Chicago that had been purchased by Ada's grandfather, attorney Justin Butterfield, to create Logan Square, a genteel neighborhood of mansions.

== Last years and death ==
When Ada Garrett's husband died in 1900, she went into seclusion, devoting her time to managing her finances. She died in 1938, leaving $2,250,000 to the Chicago History Museum, the Art Institute of Chicago, the University of Chicago, a number of Chicago hospitals and homes for the poor, disabled, and orphans, and to relatives.

== Legacy ==
Ada Street and Ada Park in Chicago are named for Ada Sawyer Garrett.
