= James Alexander Williamson =

Union Army officer during the American Civil War

James A. Williamson
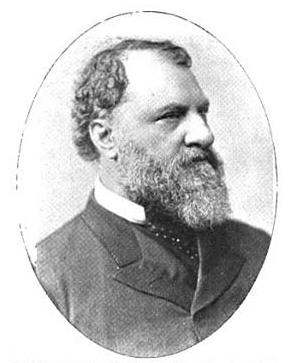
- James Alexander Williamson
- Born: February 8, 1829; Columbia, Kentucky, U.S.
- Died: September 7, 1902 (aged 73); Jamestown, Rhode Island, U.S.
- Burial place: Rock Creek Cemetery; Washington, D.C., U.S.
- Military career
- Allegiance: United States of America; Union
- Branch: United States Army; Union Army
- Service years: 1861 - 1865
- Rank: Brevet Major General
- Commands: 4th Iowa Volunteer Infantry Regiment
- Conflicts: American Civil War; Battle of Pea Ridge; Battle of Chickasaw Bayou; Battle of Arkansas Post; Vicksburg Campaign; Siege of Vicksburg; Battle of Lookout Mountain; Battle of Ringgold Gap; Atlanta campaign; Battle of Jonesborough
- Other work: lawyer, politician, President of the Atlantic & Pacific R.R.

James A. Williamson (February 8, 1829 – September 7, 1902) was a politician and lawyer who served in the Union army during the American Civil War, rising to the rank of brigadier general. He received the Medal of Honor for his actions at the Battle of Chickasaw Bayou.

== Biography ==
Williamson was born in Columbia, Kentucky in 1829. When he was fifteen years old his family moved to Iowa, where he worked as a farmer, before studying law and being admitted to the bar. In the years prior to the Civil War he served as the chairman of the Iowa State Democratic Committee.

When the Civil War began Williamson volunteered in the 4th Iowa Volunteer Infantry Regiment. Serving as a first lieutenant he fought at the battle of Pea Ridge where he was wounded on the first day of fighting there. On March 4, 1862, he was promoted to lieutenant colonel and then on July 21, 1862, to colonel of the 4th Iowa. Colonel Williamson and his regiment spent the fall of 1862 on garrison duty at Helena, Arkansas. In December Williamson was part of William T. Sherman's force which attacked the Confederate forces at the Battle of Chickasaw Bluffs. Williamson was again wounded and for his services here was eventually awarded the Medal of Honor in 1895.

Williamson recovered in time to take part in the Vicksburg Campaign and the following Siege of Vicksburg. After the fall of the city, he assumed command of the 3rd Brigade, 1st Division, XV Corps until September, 1863 then commanded the 2nd Brigade, 1st Division, XV Corps at the Battle of Chattanooga. Williamson's division, commanded by Peter J. Osterhaus was temporarily attached to the forces under Joseph Hooker and took part in the Battle of Lookout Mountain. The division was returned to the Army of the Tennessee and Williamson led the 2nd Brigade during the Atlanta campaign. At the Battle of Jonesborough he was wounded in the hand. On December 19, 1864, he received a brevet promotion to brigadier general of U.S. Volunteers, on January 13, 1865, a full promotion to brigadier general and on March 13, 1865, a brevet promotion to major general of volunteers. Briefly during the summer of 1865 he commanded the District of St. Louis and was mustered out of the volunteer service on August 24, 1865, but was on an inspection tour of army posts in the West and did not find out until he returned in October 1865.

In 1864 Williamson had been elected chairman of the Iowa delegation to the National Republican Convention in Baltimore, but did not attend due to duty to the army. After the War he resumed his law practice in Iowa. He served as Commissioner of the United States General Land Office from 1876 to 1881. During this time he served as chairman of the Public Land Commission, which was created by Congress in 1879. He later became President of the Atlantic & Pacific Railroad.

He was a companion of the New York Commandery of the Military Order of the Loyal Legion of the United States.

He was in Jamestown, Rhode Island when he died on September 7, 1902.

== Medal of Honor citation ==

Rank and Organization: Colonel, 4th Iowa Infantry.

Place and Date: At Chickasaw Bayou, Miss., 29 December 1862.

Entered service at: Des Moines, Iowa.

Born: 8 February 1829, Columbia, Adair County, Ky.

Date of issue: 17 January 1895.

Citation

Led his regiment against a superior force, strongly entrenched, and held his ground when all support had been withdrawn.

== See also ==
- List of Medal of Honor recipients
- List of American Civil War Medal of Honor recipients: T–Z
- List of American Civil War generals (Union)

== Notes ==
Political offices
Preceded by Samuel S. Burdett	Commissioner of the General Land Office; 1876–1881	Succeeded by Noah C. McFarland
