= 1847 Michigan gubernatorial election =

- November 2, 1847
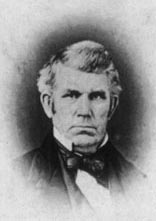

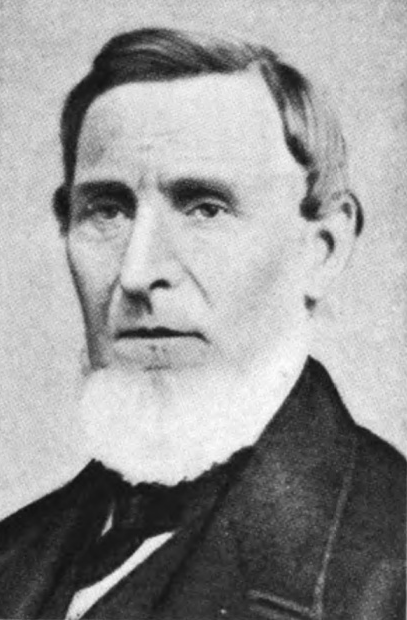
Nominee	Epaphroditus Ransom	James M. Edmunds	Chester Gurney
Party	Democratic	Whig	Liberty
Popular vote	24,639	18,990	2,585
Percentage	53.15%	40.96%	5.58%
- County results Ransom: 40–50% 50–60% 60–70% 80–90% No Data/Votes
Governor before election
William L. Greenly
Democratic
Elected Governor
Epaphroditus Ransom
Democratic

The 1847 Michigan gubernatorial election was held on November 2, 1847. Democratic nominee Epaphroditus Ransom defeated Whig nominee James M. Edmunds with 53.15% of the vote.

== General election ==
=== Candidates ===
Major party candidates

- Epaphroditus Ransom, Democratic
- James M. Edmunds, Whig

Other candidates

- Chester Gurney, Liberty

=== Results ===
1847 Michigan gubernatorial election
Party	Candidate	Votes	%	±%
Democratic	Epaphroditus Ransom	24,639	53.15%	+2.32%
Whig	James M. Edmunds	18,990	40.96%	−0.25%
Liberty	Chester Gurney	2,585	5.58%	−2.12%
	Scattering	145	0.31%	
Majority		5,649	12.19%	
Total votes		46,359	100.00%	
Democratic hold		Swing	+2.57%	

==== Results By County ====
County	Epaphroditus Ransom Democratic		James M. Edmunds Whig		Chester Gurney Liberty		Scattering Write-in		Margin		Total votes cast
County	#	%	#	%	#	%	#	%	#	%	Total votes cast
Allegan	364	53.53%	307	45.15%	8	1.18%	1	0.15%	57	8.38%	680
Berrien	752	57.85%	525	40.38%	15	1.15%	8	0.62%	227	17.46%	1,300
Branch	842	58.35%	448	31.05%	110	7.62%	43	2.98%	394	27.30%	1,443
Calhoun	1,487	52.18%	1,246	43.72%	116	4.07%	1	0.04%	241	8.46%	2,850
Cass	816	54.33%	618	41.15%	66	4.39%	2	0.13%	198	13.18%	1,502
Clinton	269	54.34%	179	36.16%	29	5.86%	18	3.64%	90	18.18%	495
Eaton	447	49.12%	400	43.96%	63	6.92%	0	0.00%	47	5.16%	910
Genesee	674	45.48%	660	44.53%	148	9.99%	0	0.00%	14	0.94%	1,482
Hillsdale	1,075	50.61%	901	42.42%	146	6.87%	2	0.09%	174	8.19%	2,124
Ingham	623	51.11%	562	46.10%	32	2.63%	2	0.16%	61	5.00%	1,219
Ionia	597	54.37%	433	39.44%	68	6.19%	0	0.00%	164	14.94%	1,098
Jackson	1,269	48.71%	1,078	41.38%	256	9.83%	2	0.08%	191	7.33%	2,605
Kalamazoo	932	45.49%	831	40.56%	286	13.96%	0	0.00%	101	4.93%	2,049
Kent	752	57.10%	535	40.62%	28	2.13%	2	0.15%	217	16.48%	1,317
Lapeer	376	53.64%	255	36.38%	37	5.28%	33	4.71%	121	17.26%	701
Lenawee	1,762	49.49%	1,616	45.39%	179	5.03%	3	0.08%	146	4.10%	3,560
Livingston	1,065	61.92%	618	35.93%	35	2.03%	2	0.12%	447	25.99%	1,720
Mackinac	95	76.00%	30	24.00%	0	0.00%	0	0.00%	65	52.00%	125
Macomb	972	57.75%	670	39.81%	39	2.32%	2	0.12%	302	17.94%	1,683
Monroe	845	66.12%	373	29.19%	50	3.91%	10	0.78%	472	36.93%	1,278
Oakland	2,036	53.55%	1,534	40.35%	231	6.08%	1	0.03%	502	13.20%	3,802
Ottawa	198	80.82%	39	15.92%	8	3.27%	0	0.00%	159	64.90%	245
Saginaw	156	57.56%	114	42.07%	1	0.37%	0	0.00%	42	15.50%	271
Shiawassee	322	53.22%	209	34.55%	71	11.74%	3	0.50%	113	18.68%	605
St. Clair	579	56.00%	435	42.07%	19	1.84%	1	0.10%	144	13.93%	1,034
St. Joseph	936	50.68%	784	42.45%	125	6.77%	2	0.11%	152	8.23%	1,847
Van Buren	506	58.29%	320	36.87%	41	4.72%	1	0.12%	186	21.43%	868
Washtenaw	1,849	47.07%	1,806	45.98%	268	6.82%	5	0.13%	43	1.09%	3,928
Wayne	2,043	56.47%	1,464	40.46%	110	3.04%	1	0.03%	579	16.00%	3,618
Total	24,639	53.15%	18,990	40.96%	2,585	5.58%	145	0.31%	5,649	12.19%	46,359

===== Counties that flipped from Whig to Democratic =====
- Eaton
- Kalamazoo
- Washtenaw
