= Walter L. Fisher =

American politician (1862–1935)

Walter Fisher
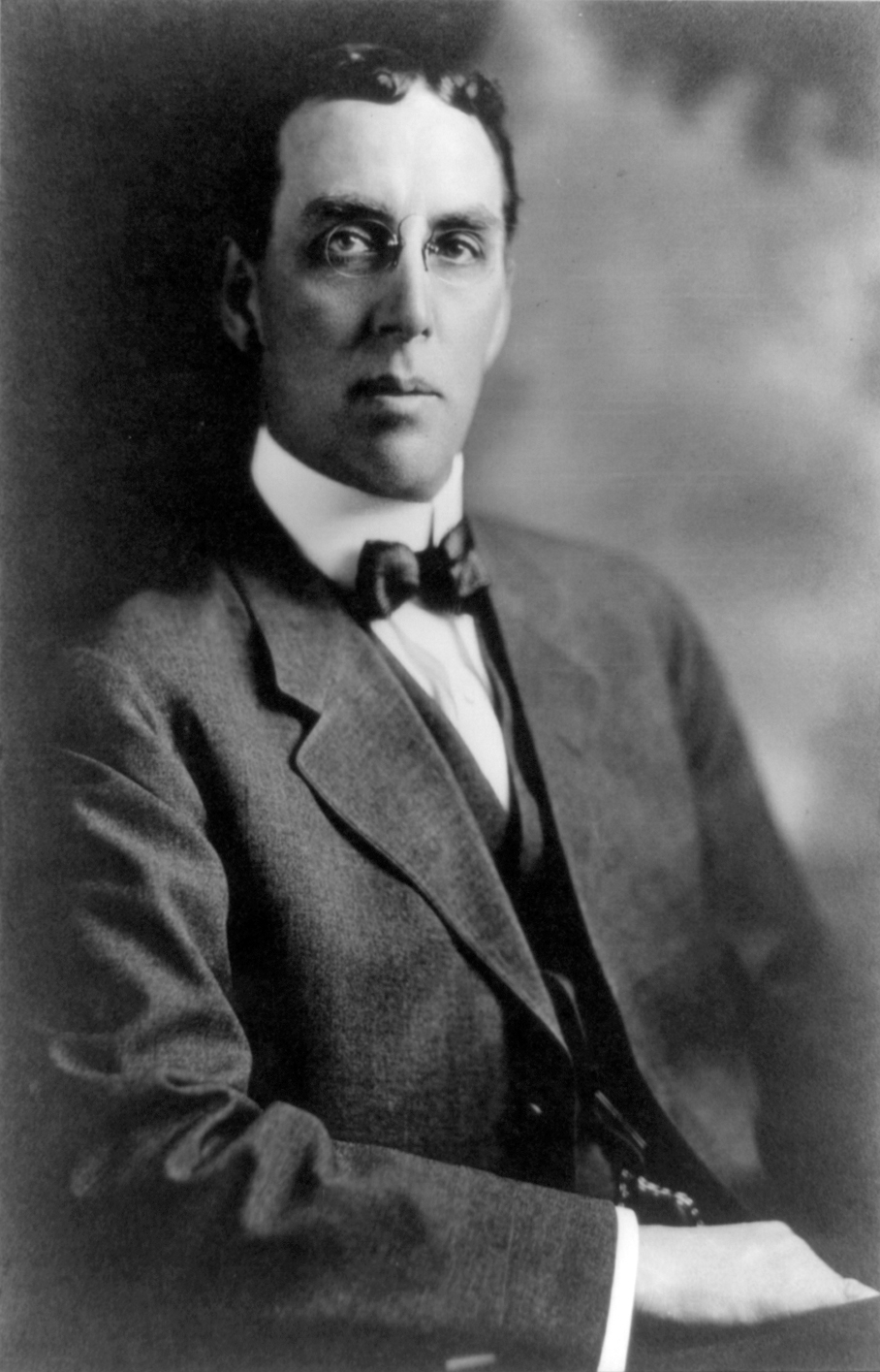
- Fisher in 1912

25th United States Secretary of the Interior
- In office March 13, 1911 – March 5, 1913
- President: William Howard Taft
- Preceded by: Richard Ballinger
- Succeeded by: Franklin Knight Lane

Personal details
- Born: Walter Lowrie Fisher; July 4, 1862 Wheeling, Virginia (now West Virginia, U.S.)
- Died: November 9, 1935 (aged 73) Winnetka, Illinois, U.S.
- Party: Republican
- Spouse: Mabel Taylor
- Education: Hanover College (BA)

Walter Lowrie Fisher (July 4, 1862 – November 9, 1935) was United States Secretary of the Interior under President William Howard Taft from 1911 to 1913.

Fisher was born July 4, 1862, in Wheeling, Virginia, to Daniel Webster Fisher (1838 – 1913), a Presbyterian minister, and his wife Amanda D. Kouns († 1911). Educated at Hanover College in Indiana from which he graduated in 1883. While at Hanover, he was initiated into the Chi chapter of the Sigma Chi fraternity. In 1890, he was elected as the fifth Grand Consul (the National President) of the Sigma Chi Fraternity, a position he held until 1892. He married Mabel Taylor on April 22, 1891, and they had five sons and two daughters.

In 1906, he was appointed by Chicago mayor Edward Fitzsimmons Dunne to serve as Special Traction Counsel, a role in which he would assist the mayor in addressing the city's traction issue. He resigned the following year after Dunne rejected his advice to accept the Settlement Ordinances that had passed in the Chicago City Council.

His papers, covering his professional and political careers and containing 14,000 items, are in the Library of Congress, Washington, D.C.

Fisher had a brother, Dr. Howard Lowrie Fisher, who established a hospital for war victims in France during World War I. He survived the sinking of the RMS Lusitania in 1915 by jumping off the ship.

Dr. Fisher died November 9, 1935, in Winnetka, Illinois.

Political offices
Preceded by Richard Achilles Ballinger	U.S. Secretary of the Interior; Served under: William Howard Taft; 1911–1913	Succeeded by Franklin Knight Lane
