= John Moulder Wilson =

United States Army general

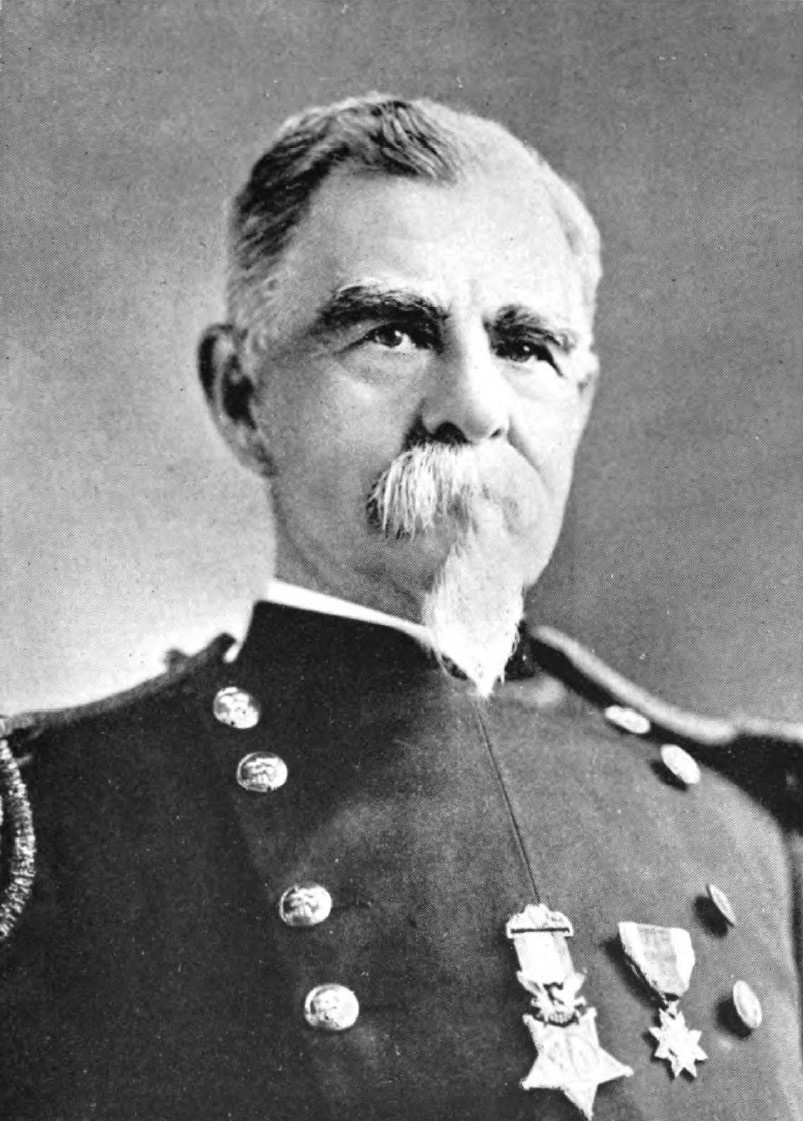
- Born: October 8, 1837; Washington, D.C., U.S.
- Died: February 1, 1919 (aged 81); Washington, D.C., U.S.
- Burial place: West Point Cemetery
- Military career
- Allegiance: United States of America; Union
- Branch: United States Army; Union Army
- Service years: 1860–1901
- Rank: Brigadier General
- Commands: Chief of Engineers
- Conflicts: American Civil War: Battle of Malvern Hill
- Awards: Medal of Honor
- Other work: Superintendent of the United States Military Academy

Signature
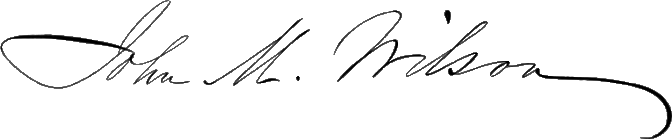

John Moulder Wilson (October 8, 1837 – February 1, 1919) was a Union Army officer and later served as Chief of Engineers as well as serving as Superintendent of the United States Military Academy from 1889 to 1893. He was a recipient of the Medal of Honor for bravery in combat during the American Civil War.

== Biography ==
Wilson was born in Washington, D.C. He graduated from the United States Military Academy in 1860 and was commissioned into combined Batteries B & L, 2nd U.S. Artillery as part of the U.S. Horse Artillery Brigade. He transferred to the Corps of Topographical Engineers in July 1862 and was awarded the Medal of Honor for fighting at the Battle of Malvern Hill in Virginia, on August 6, 1862. He joined the United States Army Corps of Engineers in 1863 and received three brevet promotions for gallant service in Alabama.

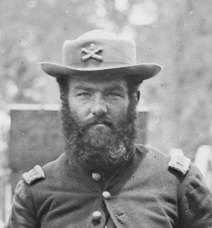
First Lieutenant John M.Wilson, June 1862. Detail of a photo by James F. Gibson. Library of Congress.

After the Civil War, Wilson worked on Hudson River improvements and drafted plans for the canal around the Cascades of the Columbia River. He improved the Great Lakes harbors of Oswego, New York, Cleveland, Ohio, and Toledo, Ohio. Wilson headed the divisions of the Chief's office pertaining to military affairs for four years, was in charge of public buildings and grounds in Washington during both Grover Cleveland administrations, and was Superintendent of West Point from 1889 to 1893 during the administration of President Benjamin Harrison. Before his appointment as Chief of Engineers, he was Northeast Division Engineer. He was appointed as Chief Engineer of the US Army and promoted to brigadier general on February 1, 1897. As Chief of Engineers, he directed the Corps' activities during the Spanish–American War.

Wilson retired from the Corps on April 30, 1901. He served as an arbitrator during the Coal Strike of 1902, and was president of the Columbia Hospital for Women from 1902 to 1907. He remained a prominent figure in the cultural life of Washington until his death there on February 1, 1919.

General Wilson was a Companion of the Military Order of the Loyal Legion of the United States. He also received an honorary Doctor of Laws degree from Columbia University.

== Medal of Honor citation ==
Rank and organization: First Lieutenant, U.S. Engineers. Place and date: At Malvern Hill, Va., August 6, 1862. Entered service at: Washington Territory. Birth: Washington D.C.. Date of issue: July 3, 1897.

Citation:

Remained on duty, while suffering from an acute illness and very weak, and participated in the action of that date. A few days previous he had been transferred to a staff corps, but preferred to remain until the close of the campaign, taking part in several actions.

== Personal ==
Wilson was the son of Joseph Shields Wilson and his first wife Eliza Uhler Moulder. His older sister Mary Shields Wilson was the wife of Brevet Brig. Gen. Thomas Duncan. His older brother Brevet Brig. Gen. Thomas Wilson was a 1853 West Point graduate and his younger brother Lt. Commander Downs Lorraine Wilson was an 1871 Naval Academy graduate.

Wilson married Augusta Bertha Waller. They had a daughter, but she died about six months old in New Orleans. Wilson and his wife were buried at the West Point Cemetery.

== See also ==
- List of American Civil War Medal of Honor recipients: T–Z

Military offices
Preceded by John G. Parke	Superintendent of the U.S. Military Academy; 1889–1893	Succeeded by Oswald Herbert Ernst
Preceded by William Price Craighill	Chief of Engineers; 1897–1901	Succeeded by Henry Martyn Robert
