= Epaphroditus Ransom =

American judge (1798–1859)

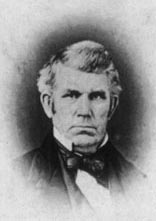

7th Governor of Michigan
- In office January 3, 1848 – January 7, 1850
- Lieutenant: William M. Fenton
- Preceded by: William L. Greenly
- Succeeded by: John S. Barry

Member of the Michigan House of Representatives from the Kalamazoo County 2nd district
- In office January 1, 1853 – December 31, 1854
- Preceded by: Ezra Stetson and Barney Earl
- Succeeded by: Henry Montague

Postmaster of Montpelier, Vermont
- In office September 14, 1831 – September 22, 1834
- Preceded by: John P. Marsh
- Succeeded by: Ezekiel Ransom

Member of the Vermont House of Representatives from Montpelier
- In office 1828–1830
- Preceded by: Luke S. Rand
- Succeeded by: William R. Shafter

Personal details
- Born: March 24, 1798 Shelburne Falls, Massachusetts
- Died: November 11, 1859 (aged 61) Fort Scott, Kansas
- Party: Democratic
- Spouse: Almira Cadwell Ransom

Epaphroditus Ransom (March 24, 1798 – November 11, 1859) was an American politician who served as the seventh governor of Michigan and as a justice of the Michigan Supreme Court.

== Early life ==
Ransom was born in Shelburne Falls, Massachusetts. There is disagreement about the year of his birth, sometimes given as 1787, 1796, or 1798. Sources have also shown two different dates of death, November 9 and 11. His tombstone shows he died at the age of 61 on November 11, 1859, which agrees with the 1798 year of birth.

He was the fourth of twelve children and was educated at various schools in New England, such as Chester Academy of Vermont for four years. He studied at Northampton Law School in Northampton, Massachusetts receiving his degree in 1823, and then began his own practice in Townshend, Vermont. He married Almira Cadwell on February 21, 1827, in Montpelier, Vermont, and they had four children, two of whom died during infancy. He was elected to the Vermont House of Representatives, but after seeing his siblings move to Michigan Territory as well as receiving advice from former Vermonter and Michigan Territorial delegate, Lucius Lyon, decided instead to move his family there in 1834.

== Life and politics in Michigan ==
After over a month of traveling by wagon and steamboat, the Ransoms arrived in Michigan Territory on November 14, 1834, in the small town of Bronson, which is now Kalamazoo, Michigan. There he gained admittance to the bar and began practicing law. He took up farming and other business ventures and soon became active in politics. He served in the state legislature and became that area's first circuit court judge, riding horseback through the wilderness to hear cases.

Ransom was appointed by Governor Stevens T. Mason as an associate justice of the state Supreme Court in 1837 and served as chief justice from 1843 to 1848. In one notable issue, he issued a declaration in 1840 that prevented the removal of the Catholic Potawatomi from their lands in southwestern Michigan.

== Governor of Michigan and later life ==
In 1848, Ransom resigned from the court after being elected governor, and was the first governor to be inaugurated in Lansing, Michigan, after the state capitol moved there from Detroit. During his term as governor, the first telegraph line from New York City to Detroit was completed and the first message sent on March 1.

There were two notable immigrations to the state during his administration. A group of Dutch immigrants came to western Michigan, led by Rev. Van Raalte, of the Dutch Reformed Church. They founded the city of Holland, Michigan and later established Hope College. James Jesse Strang led the other immigration, consisting of a faction of Mormon followers. They settled on Beaver Island in northern Lake Michigan. Strang founded a kingdom there with a capital, St. James named for himself. Strang was even elected to the state legislature twice, but anti-Mormon sentiment and his totalitarian rule of the island led to his assassination.

Because of Ransom's strong anti-slavery position, the state Democratic Party did not re-nominate him for governor in 1850. He was elected again to the state legislature in 1853 and 1854.

Ransom was the first president of the Michigan Agricultural Society, which was instrumental in the creation of both the Michigan State Fair and Michigan State University. He served as regent of the University of Michigan from 1850 to 1852 and was a co-founder of the village of Augusta, Michigan.

His private business ventures were ruined by the Panic of 1855, and in 1857, Ransom accepted appointment from U.S. President James Buchanan as receiver of the public monies for the Osage Land Office in Fort Scott, Kansas.

== Death ==
He died at the age of 61 in Fort Scott and is interred at Mountain Home Cemetery in Kalamazoo.

Party political offices
Preceded by Alpheus Felch	Democratic nominee for Governor of Michigan; 1847	Succeeded by John S. Barry
Political offices
Preceded by William L. Greenly	Governor of Michigan; 1848–1850	Succeeded by John S. Barry
