= Clay Tallman =

American politician

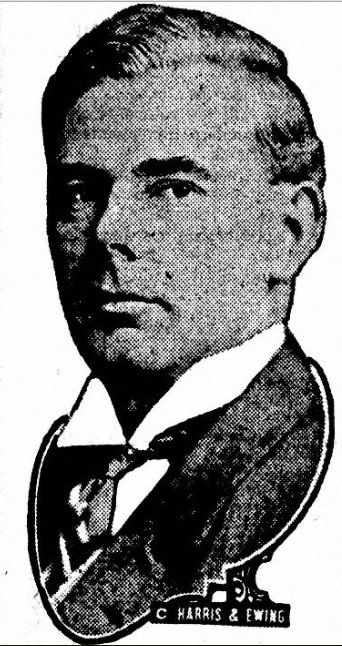

33rd Commissioner of the General Land Office
- In office June 5, 1913 – March 22, 1921
- President: Woodrow Wilson; Warren G. Harding
- Preceded by: Fred Dennett
- Succeeded by: William Spry

Personal details
- Born: May 7, 1874 Belding, Michigan, US
- Died: August 25, 1949 (aged 75) Montrose, Colorado, US
- Resting place: St. Josephs Cemetery, Rawlings, Wyoming
- Education: Michigan State University; University of Michigan Law School

Clay Tallman was a Democratic politician from the U.S. State of Nevada. He was Commissioner of the United States General Land Office from 1913 to 1921. He was born May 7, 1874, at Belding, Michigan. He graduated from what is now Michigan State University in 1895.

Tallman was appointed Commissioner on May 27, 1913, by Woodrow Wilson. He was a lawyer from Nevada, and was a member of the Nevada State Senate from 1909 to 1913, serving as President pro tempore during his last session. He was also chairman of the Democratic State Central Committee of Nevada, and was his party's candidate for the United States House of Representatives in 1912.

Tallman was confirmed by the United States Senate, and was commissioned June 5, 1913. He was replaced by William Spry on March 22, 1921. He died at Montrose, Colorado August 25, 1949.
