= Oswald Herbert Ernst =

Chief of Staff of the United States Army from 1914 to 1917

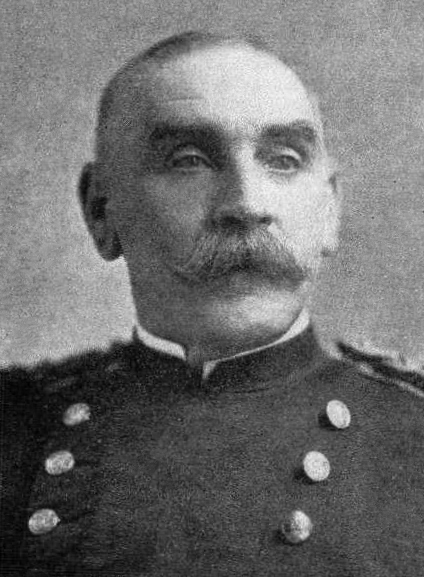
- Brigadier General Oswald H. Ernst
- Born: June 27, 1842 near Cincinnati, Ohio, U.S.
- Died: March 21, 1926 (aged 83); Washington, D.C., U.S.
- Burial place: Arlington National Cemetery
- Military career
- Allegiance: United States of America
- Branch: United States Army
- Service years: 1864–1906
- Rank: Major General
- Unit: Corps of Engineers
- Commands: Superintendent of the United States Military Academy
- Conflicts: American Civil War: Battle of Atlanta; Battle of Ezra Church; Atlanta campaign; Spanish–American War: Battle of Coamo

Oswald Herbert Ernst (June 27, 1842 – March 21, 1926) was an engineer, military educator, and career officer in the United States Army who became superintendent of the United States Military Academy. Over a forty-year career, Ernst served as an engineer during Sherman's Siege of Atlanta during the American Civil War, commanded U.S. troops at Coamo during the Spanish–American War, and sat on the original commission for the Panama Canal after retirement from active service.

== Life ==
Oswald Ernst was born June 27, 1842, near Cincinnati, Ohio, the son of Sarah Otis and Andrew H. Ernst. His mother was descended from Richard Warren, who traveled to Plymouth Colony from Southampton, England, on the Mayflower. Andrew Ernst was himself the son of a recent immigrant, a burgomaster who had fled Germany during the Napoleonic Wars and afterward settled in the Ohio River valley. The younger Ernst was an excellent student, admitted to Harvard in 1858, and left that place of learning to accept an appointment from Ohio to the United States Military Academy at West Point, New York, in 1860.

Upon his death on March 21, 1926, he was buried at Arlington National Cemetery, in Arlington, Virginia.

== Military career ==
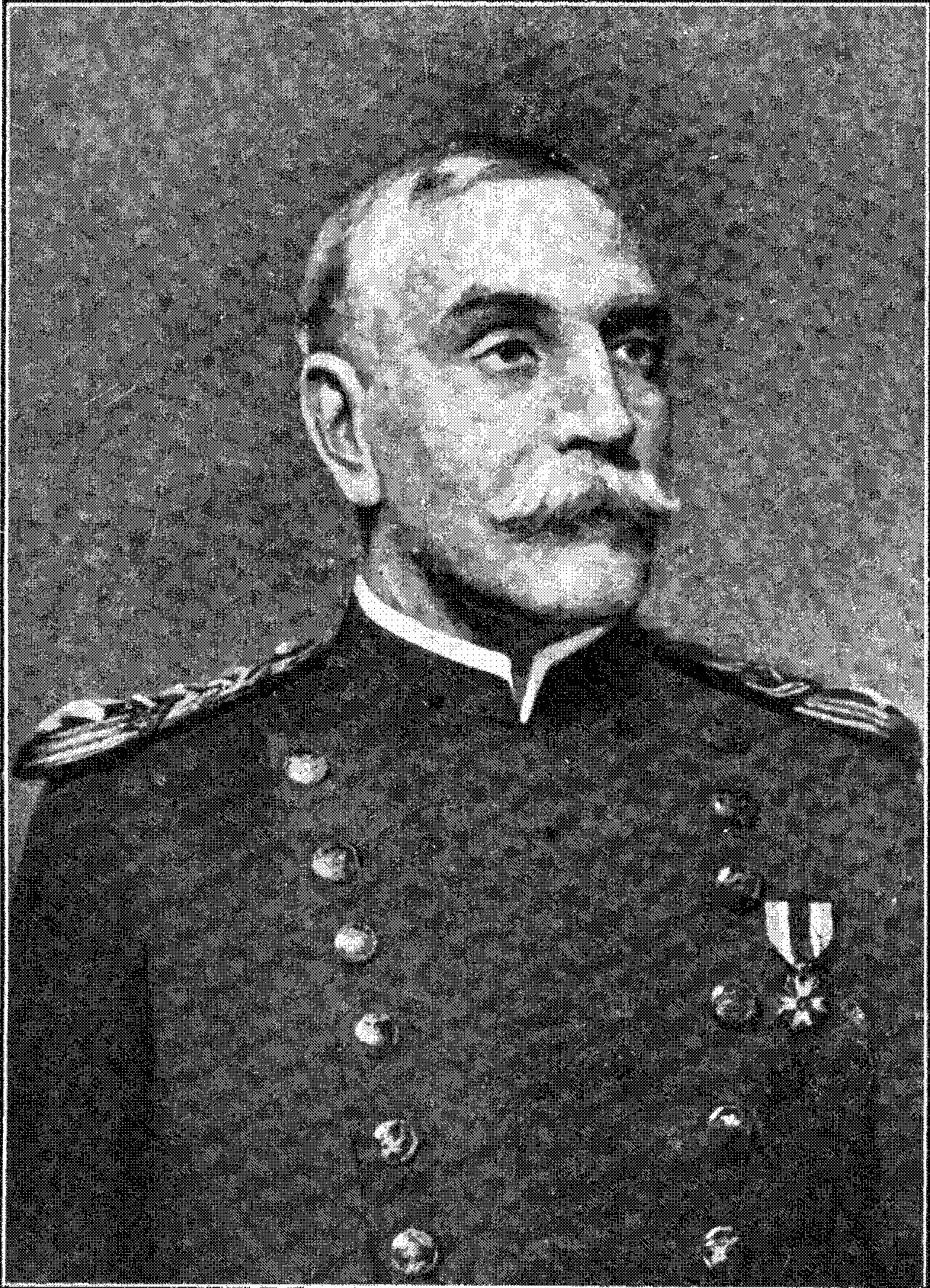
Mayor General O.H. Ernst

When the American Civil War broke out, plebe Ernst stayed at the academy with the Union-born cadets while most southerners left for the Confederacy. Ernst graduated from USMA just before his twenty-second birthday and was immediately billeted to First Lieutenant, Corps of Engineers. Within the month, Ernst was employed by the Army of the Tennessee as an assistant engineer before Atlanta, took part in the Battle of Ezra Church, and was engaged in siege activities before Atlanta's surrender. In October, 1864, Lt. Ernst was back at West Point as assistant professor of engineering, lecturing about what he'd learned of practical siege engineering in the four months since his graduation.

Ernst married Elizabeth Amory Lee in late 1866, and spent the years immediately after the war working on constructing fortifications on the Pacific coast, and remained so occupied until 1868. He was promoted to captain in March 1867, and had command of an engineer company at Willets Point, Queens, from 1868 until 1871. After detail as "Astronomer of the U.S. Commission to observe in Spain the Solar eclipse of December 22, 1870," from 1871 until 1878, Ernst was again lecturing USMA cadets about "practical engineering" and commanding the post's elite engineer company. While teaching cadets and writing the Manual of Practical Military Engineering, Ernst found time to author articles for Johnson's Encyclopedia and raise his two daughters Helen Amory and Elizabeth Lee.

From 1878 until 1889, Ernst was chief engineer on Osage and Mississippi River projects, and was responsible for the deepening of shipping routes in Galveston Bay. In 1889, Ernst became military aide-de-camp to President Benjamin Harrison and chief engineer in charge of Washington's public buildings and monuments. In 1893, the Ernst family returned once again to West Point, this time to occupy the superintendent's billet.

After the explosion of the USS Maine in February, 1898, Ernst was promoted to brigadier general of volunteers and put in command of the 1st Division of volunteer troops deployed to the Puerto Rican Campaign.

== Selected works by Ernst ==
- Account of the Eclipse of 1870 in Spain. H. Battalion Press. 1871.
- A Manual of Practical Military Engineering. New York: D. Van Nortstrand. 1873. p. 296.
- An Address Before the Graduating Class of the Engineering School of the Missouri University. Statesman Book and Job Printing House. 1881.
- Bixby, William Herbert; Casey, Thomas Lincoln (1905). Report Upon Survey, with Plans and Estimates of Cost, for a Navigable Waterway 14 Feet Deep from Lockport, Ill: By Way of Des Planes and Illinois Rivers, to the Mouth of Said Illinois River, and Thence by Way of the Mississippi River to St. Louis, Mo. United States Mississippi River Commission. Washington, D.C.: Government Printing Office. p. 544.
- Mississippi River Improvements: Hearing. Washington, D.C.: Government Printing Office. March 30, 1906. p. 22.
- Gibbons, George Christie (March 30, 1906). Report upon the Chicago Drainage Canal (2 ed.). Washington, D.C.: Government Printing Office. p. 54.
- Ernst, Oswald Herbert; Gibbons, George Christie (1910). Report of the International Waterways Commission on the Regulation of Lake Erie: with a discussion of the regulation of the Great Lakes system. International Waterways Commission. p. 169.
- Ernst, Oswald Herbert; Gibbons, George Christie (1910). Regulation of Lake Erie: Message from the President of the United States. International Waterways Commission. p. 158.

== Notes ==
Military offices
Preceded by John Moulder Wilson	Superintendents of the United States Military Academy; 1893–1898	Succeeded by Albert Leopold Mills
