= List of commissioners of the United States General Land Office =

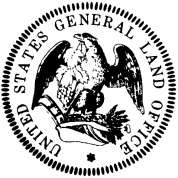

The United States General Land Office was an independent agency of the United States government responsible for public domain lands in the United States. It was created in 1812, and it merged with the United States Grazing Service in 1946 to become the Bureau of Land Management. The official in charge of the agency was called the commissioner of the General Land Office, appointed by the president and confirmed by the Senate.

Commissioner	Image	Date of commission	Residence	Notes
Edward Tiffin		May 7, 1812	Ohio	
Josiah Meigs		October 11, 1814	Georgia	
John McLean		September 11, 1822	Ohio	
George Graham		June 26, 1823	District of Columbia	
Elijah Hayward		September 30, 1830	Ohio	
Ethan Allen Brown		July 24, 1835	Ohio	
James Whitcomb		October 21, 1836	Indiana	
Elisha Mills Huntington		July 2 or 3, 1841	New York	
Thomas H. Blake		May 19, 1842	Indiana	
James Shields		April 16, 1845	Illinois	
Richard M. Young		January 6, 1847	Illinois	
Justin Butterfield		July 1, 1849	Illinois	
John Wilson		September 16, 1852	District of Columbia	
Thomas A. Hendricks		August 8, 1855	Indiana	
Samuel Axley Smith		October 13, 1859	Tennessee	
Joseph S. Wilson		February 23, 1860	District of Columbia	
James M. Edmunds		March 16 or 19, 1861	Michigan	
Joseph S. Wilson		September 1, 1866	District of Columbia	
Willis Drummond		February 4, 1871	Iowa	
Samuel S. Burdett		July 1, 1874	Missouri	
James A. Williamson		June 24, 1876	Iowa	
Noah C. McFarland		June 17, 1881	Kansas	
William A. J. Sparks		March 26, 1885	Illinois	
Strother M. Stockslager		March 27, 1888	Indiana	
Lewis A. Groff		September 16, 1889	Nebraska	
Thomas Henry Carter		March 31, 1891	Montana	
William M. Stone		November 18, 1892	Iowa	
Silas W. Lamoreaux		March 28, 1893	Wisconsin	
Binger Hermann		March 25, 1897	Oregon	
William A. Richards		January 26, 1903	Wyoming	
Richard A. Ballinger		January 28, 1907	Washington	
Fred Dennett		January 14, 1908	North Dakota	
Clay Tallman		June 5, 1913	Nevada	
William Spry		March 22, 1921	Utah	
Charles C. Moore		May 9, 1929	Idaho	
Fred W. Johnson		May 20, 1933	Wyoming	
