= Center Township, Dearborn County, Indiana =

Center Township
- Township
- Location of Center Township in Dearborn County
- Coordinates: 39°03′19″N 84°54′49″W
- Country: United States
- State: Indiana
- County: Dearborn

Government
  - Type: Indiana township

Area
  - Total: 11.35 sq mi (29.4 km^{2})
  - Land: 10.75 sq mi (27.8 km^{2})
  - Water: 0.6 sq mi (1.6 km^{2})
- Elevation: 466 ft (142 m)

Population (2020)
  - Total: 5,027
  - Density: 494.6/sq mi (191.0/km^{2})
- FIPS code: 18-11278
- GNIS feature ID: 453175

Center Township is one of fourteen townships in Dearborn County, Indiana. As of the 2010 census, its population was 5,318 and it contained 2,267 housing units.

== History ==
Center Township was organized in 1839.

Laughery Creek Bridge, River View Cemetery, and Veraestau are listed on the National Register of Historic Places.

== Geography ==
According to the 2010 census, the township has a total area of 11.35 square miles (29.4 km^{2}), of which 10.75 square miles (27.8 km^{2}) (or 94.71%) is land and 0.6 square miles (1.6 km^{2}) (or 5.29%) is water.

=== Cities and towns ===
- Aurora (vast majority)

=== Unincorporated towns ===
- Cochran
- Texas
- Utah
- Westside

(This list is based on USGS data and may include former settlements.)

=== Major highways ===
- U.S. Route 50
- State Road 56
- State Road 148
- State Road 350

=== Cemeteries ===
The township contains one cemetery, Riverview.

== Education ==
Center Township residents may obtain a library card at the Aurora Public Library in Aurora.
