= River View Cemetery (Aurora, Indiana) =

Cemetery in Indiana, USA

- U.S. National Register of Historic Places
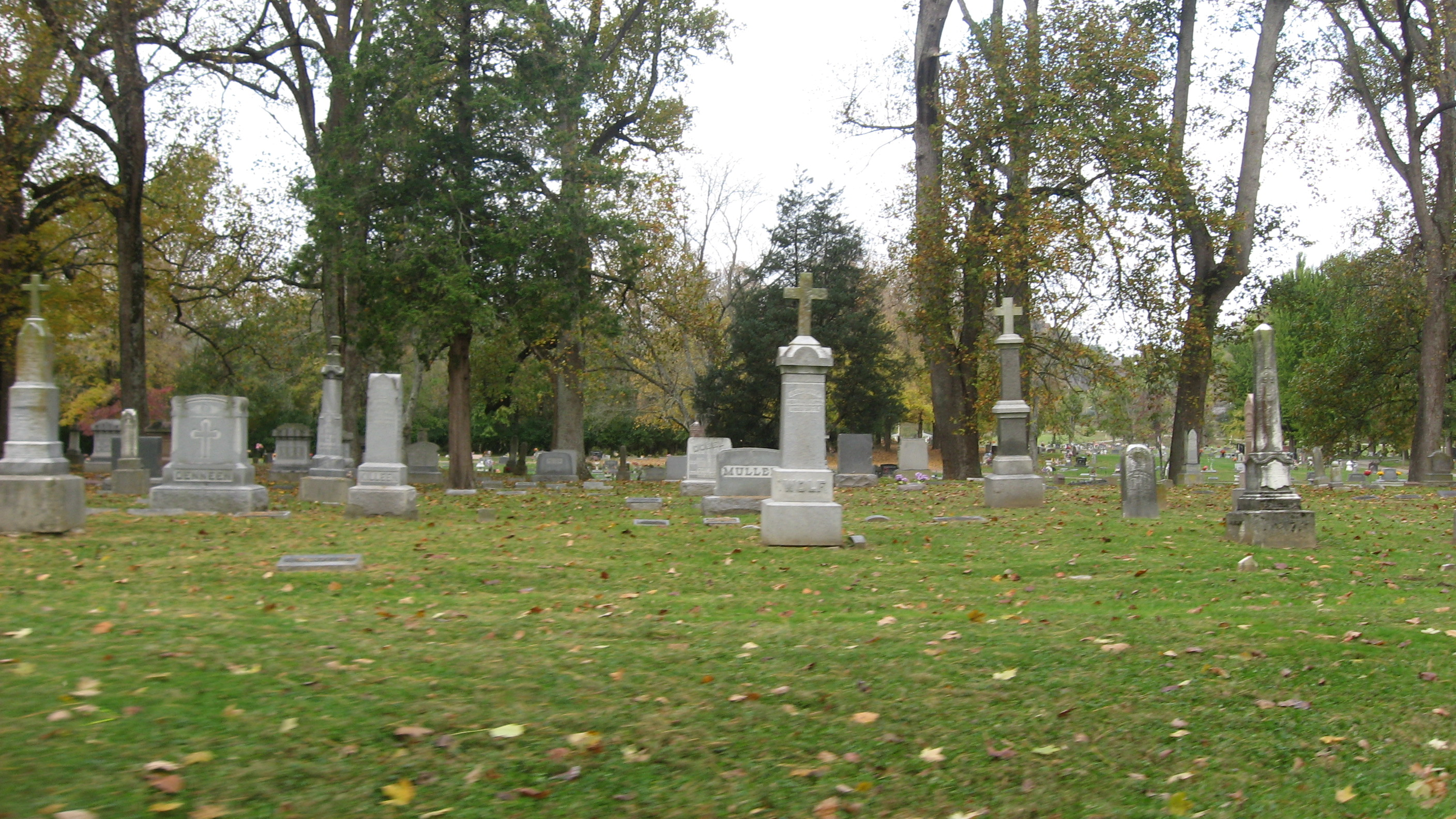
- River View Cemetery, October 2012

- Location within Indiana Location within the United States
- Location: 3635 E. Laughery Creek Rd., south of Aurora, Center Township, Dearborn County, Indiana
- Coordinates: 39°01′33″N 84°53′16″W
- Area: 30 acres (12 ha)
- Built: 1869
- Architect: Tinsley, William
- Architectural style: Romanesque Revival, Victorian
- NRHP reference No.: 13001011
- Added to NRHP: December 31, 2013

River View Cemetery is a historic rural cemetery located in Center Township, Dearborn County, Indiana. Designed by noted architect William Tinsley, the cemetery was established in 1869, and features curvilinear and contoured drive paths and radial burial arrangements. Notable contributing resources include the Soldier's Circle; entry gate, fencing, and signage; the cemetery chapel (1906); Romanesque Revival style well house (1889); and three mausoleums: the Yorm Mausoleum (1886), Stevens Mausoleum (1907), and McHenry Mausoleum (1877). Notable interments include Jesse Lynch Holman (1784–1842) (reburial from Veraestau), Lonnie Mack (1941–2016), and William Steele Holman (1822–1897).

It was added to the National Register of Historic Places in 2013.
