= Daisy E. Nirdlinger =

American writer

Daisy E. Nirdinger
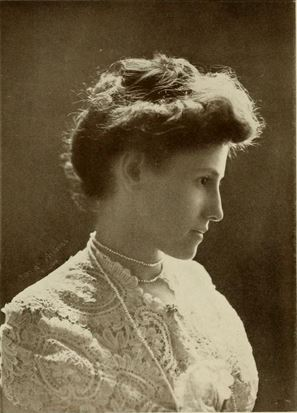
- Daisy E Nirdlinger in 1914
- Born: 14 March 1879; Fort Wayne, Indiana
- Died: 28 May 1950 (aged 71); Fort Wayne, Indiana
- Writing career
- Pen name: D. Ella Nirdlinger

Daisy Ella Nirdlinger (March 14, 1879 – May 28, 1950) was an American businesswoman and children's book author. She was the first president of the Women's Advertising Club of St. Louis, founded in 1916.

== Early life ==
Daisy Ella Nirdlinger was born on March 14, 1879, in Fort Wayne, Indiana, to Maximillian Nirdlinger Sr. (1846–1902), a writer and inventor and Julia Marie Myerson (1852–1908), of St. Louis. Her paternal grandfather, Frederick Noerdlinger Nirdlinger (1810–1873), was one of the first settlers and the city's most noted philanthropist. She had six siblings: Samuel Lambert (1871–1902), Maude Louise (1872–1971), Eli Frederick (1874–1875), Clarence Dawson (1876–1950, married Marion Hollway), Maximilian Jr. (1881–1966, married Elsie Florence Hoffner and Adelaide E. Ernst, an architect of note in Philadelphia), and Albert Patrick Gabriel (1887–1952, married Nellie Turner).

Nirdlinger attended a convent school in Milwaukee, and pursued post-graduate studies in Literature at Drexel University in Philadelphia.

== Business career ==
Nirdlinger began her business career in the early 20th century as a solicitor for a well-known advertising company. After two years she became the advertising manager of the Mercantile Trust Company. While with this company, she founded and edited The Mercantile, the first monthly magazine published by a trust company. A year later she bought an interest in, and became secretary and treasurer of, the Fisher-Steinbruegge Advertising Company, which had three officers and four employees. Ten years later the company had 25 employees, and was the only advertising agency in St. Louis that could produce copy, designing, printing, and engraving for every kind of advertising, all under one roof.

"If at first you don't succeed—work, and then work some more."

— Daisy Nirdlinger

Nirdlinger's work consisted of calling on the St. Louis manufacturers, wholesalers, and retailers in the capacity of an advertising counselor. If they were national advertisers or had a product that could be profitably advertised to the consumer, she discussed Agency services: the planning and placing of the copy in newspapers, magazines, farm papers, or other mediums, as the case required. If they were users of catalogues, booklets, circulars, and special advertising literature, she could execute that part of the work with the modern equipment of her company. Nirdlinger could handle a simple envelope and enclosure printed in one color, or an elaborate trade catalogue of 300 pages. She had arranged and delivered complete catalogues, illustrating men's and women's fashions, shoes, stoves, machinery, fire-brick, toys, jewelry, and automobiles, and graphically designed booklets on numerous subjects.

== Children's author ==
Nirdlinger was the author of the Althea series of books for children, writing under the name "D. Ella Nirdlinger." The series included the books Althea, or, the children of Rosemont plantation and Dear Friends, both published by the Benziger Brothers in 1908. A third book, The Alvoyds, was planned for 1914. The first book in the series was adopted by the Commissioners of the Louisiana Purchase Exposition as the official souvenir for young people, and was illustrated by Egbert Cadmus (1868–1939).

== Memberships and affiliations ==
"All's right with the world if you're right with it".

— Daisy Nirdlinger

Nirdlinger was the first president of the Women's Advertising Club of St. Louis. Active membership was open only to women who were and had "been, as a means of livelihood, actually engaged for a period of at least three years," in one of the phases of advertising (creation, production, executive). In addition to active, the club offered junior, non-resident, and life classes of membership.

Nirdlinger volunteered at the Guardian Angel Settlement Association on Tenth and Menard Streets, where she conducted a businesswomen's literary class. The motto of the class was "Let me live by the side of the road and be a friend to man". Nirdlinger also volunteered at the Methodist Episcopal Home for Girls, 4310 Morgan Street, an "honor home" serving homeless and delinquent girls. She conducted weekly reading classes at the home, selecting reading materials with an eye to instilling moral values in the students. The Methodist Episcopal Home project was the beginning of a new system for the lending of a helping hand to the helpless when they needed it most.

Nirdlinger was a co-founder of the Papyrus Club, one of the first writers' clubs in St. Louis. She was also a member of the Vortex Club, a professional organization whose mission was "the mutual advancement and benefit of the business trade or profession of its members, by trading or doing business, one with the other, in order to develop a close comradeship." The Vortex Club became a Lions Club charter on July 25, 1917, taking on the Lions Club name and committing to semi-annual dues of $1 per member.

== Personal life ==
Nirdlinger died of chronic myocarditis on May 28, 1950, and is buried at Lindenwood Cemetery, Fort Wayne.
