= Jesse Lynch Holman =

American judge (1784–1842)

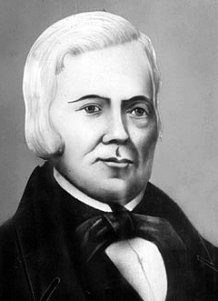

Judge of the United States District Court for the District of Indiana
- In office October 8, 1835 – March 28, 1842
- Appointed by: Andrew Jackson
- Preceded by: Benjamin Parke
- Succeeded by: Elisha Mills Huntington

Judge of the Supreme Court of Indiana
- In office May 5, 1817 – December 28, 1830
- Appointed by: Jonathan Jennings
- Preceded by: Seat established
- Succeeded by: John T. McKinney

Presiding Judge of Indiana Territory's Second Judicial Circuit
- In office September 20, 1814 – December 21, 1816
- Appointed by: Thomas Posey

President of the Indiana Territory Legislative Council
- In office August 15, 1814 – September 10, 1814
- Constituency: Dearborn and Jefferson Counties

Member of the Indiana Territory House of Representatives from Dearborn County
- In office 1814
- Preceded by: Isaac Dunn

County Prosecutor of Dearborn County
- In office May 28, 1811 – 1814
- Appointed by: William Henry Harrison
- Preceded by: James Dill

Personal details
- Born: Jesse Lynch Holman; October 24, 1784 Danville, District of Kentucky, Virginia
- Died: March 28, 1842 (aged 57) Aurora, Indiana
- Resting place: River View Cemetery; Aurora, Indiana
- Spouse: Elizabeth Masterson (m. 1810)
- Relations: Allen Hamilton (son-in-law)
- Children: 6, including William S. Holman
- Parent(s): Henry Holman; Jane Gordon

Jesse Lynch Holman (October 24, 1784 – March 28, 1842) was an Indiana attorney, politician and jurist, as well as a novelist, poet, city planner and preacher. He helped to found Indiana University, Franklin College and the Indiana Historical Society. He was one of the first three Justices of the Indiana Supreme Court and a United States district judge of the United States District Court for the District of Indiana.

== Education and career ==
Born on October 24, 1784, near Danville, District of Kentucky, Virginia (now Kentucky), Holman grew up on the frontier. He read law and was admitted to the Kentucky bar on September 2, 1805. He entered private practice in Pointe William (now Carrollton), Kentucky from 1805 to 1811, also practicing in New Castle, Kentucky and Frankfort, Kentucky. In 1808, Holman came to the Indiana Territory and acquired land in Dearborn County. He continued private practice in Aurora, Indiana Territory (State of Indiana from December 11, 1816) from 1811 to 1835, becoming a prominent politician and jurist. He was appointed by Governor William Henry Harrison to be prosecutor for Dearborn County, Indiana Territory in 1811. He was the territorial representative for the Indiana Territory in 1814. He was President of the Indiana Territorial Council in 1814. He was a Judge of the Circuit Court of Indiana Territory from 1814 to 1816, with the Second Judicial Circuit from 1814 to 1816, and with the Third Judicial Circuit in 1816. He was appointed by Governor of Indiana Jonathan Jennings to serve as a justice of the Indiana Supreme Court, serving from 1817 to December 28, 1830. He was Superintendent of Schools for Dearborn County, Indiana from 1830 to 1834. He was a candidate for the United States Senate from Indiana in 1831.

=== Notable case as Indiana Supreme Court Justice ===
One of the most notable cases to appear before Justices Holman, James Scott, and Isaac N. Blackford was Lasselle v. State. In this case the Indiana Supreme Court reversed a lower court's decision and held that "The framers of our constitution intended a total and entire prohibition of slavery in this State; and we can conceive of no form of words in which that intention could have been more clearly stated."

== Federal judicial service ==
Holman received a recess appointment from President Andrew Jackson on September 16, 1835, to a seat on the United States District Court for the District of Indiana vacated by Judge Benjamin Parke, being sworn in on October 8 of that year. He was nominated to the same position by President Jackson on March 21, 1836. After some political disagreements among the Indiana Congressional delegation were resolved, he was confirmed by the United States Senate on March 29, 1836, and received his commission the same day. His service terminated on March 28, 1842, due to his death in Aurora. Originally buried at Veraestau, he was later moved to the Holman family plot at River View Cemetery.

== Other service ==
In addition to judicial duties, Holman was an active leader in Dearborn County's civic affairs. He helped plat the town of Aurora in 1819. A lifelong Baptist, Holman was active in the church's missionary work and Sunday school programs, helping to establish the First Baptist Church of Aurora in 1820 and the Indiana Bible Society in 1831. Holman also supported public education. He helped found Aurora's public library and served as the superintendent for Dearborn County schools from 1832 to 1834. In 1834, during a break from political life, Holman became an ordained minister and preached at the First Baptist Church of Aurora.

== Novelist ==
In 1808, Holman wrote a novel, The Prisoners of Niagara; or, Errors of Education.

== Family ==
In 1810, Holman married Elizabeth Masterson, the daughter of Judge Richard M. Masterson, a wealthy Kentucky landowner and jurist. Holman brought his wife and first child to Dearborn County in 1811 and built a home he named "Veraestau" on a bluff overlooking the Ohio River. He was the father of Congressman William S. Holman (1822–1897). Holman's daughter, Emmerine, married Allen Hamilton, a founder of Fort Wayne, Indiana.

== Sources ==
- Blake, George. "Jesse Lynch Holman: Pioneer Hoosier." Indiana Magazine of History 39 (March 1943).
- Gugin, Linda C., and James E. St. Clair, eds. Justices of the Indiana Supreme Court. Indianapolis, IN: Indiana Historical Society Press, 2010.
- "Seeking a Federal Judgeship under Jackson." Indiana Magazine of History 35 (September 1939).
- Shepard, Randall T., "Slave Cases and the Indiana Supreme Court." Traces of Indiana and Midwestern History 15 (Summer 2003) p. 34–41.

Legal offices
Preceded by Benjamin Parke	Judge of the United States District Court for the District of Indiana; 1835–1842	Succeeded by Elisha Mills Huntington
