= Guardian Angel Settlement Association =

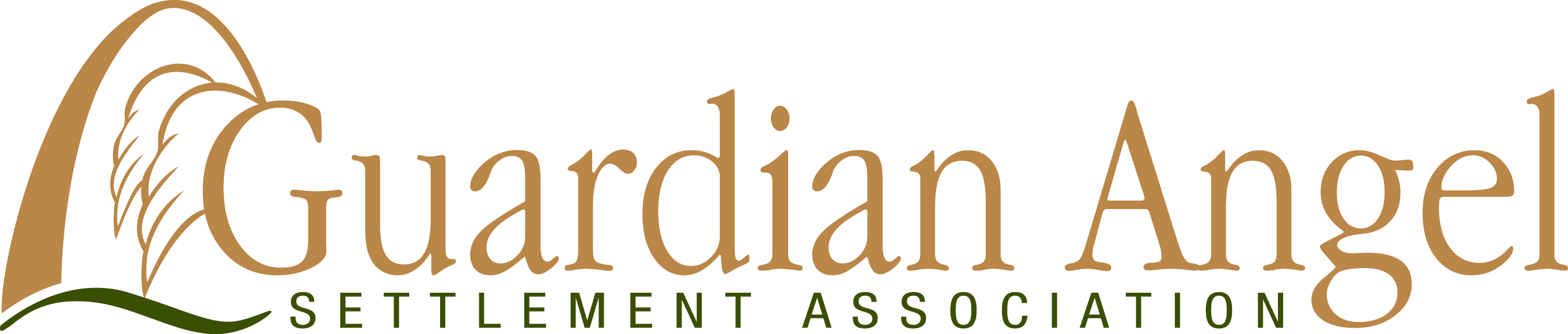
- Guardian Angel Settlement Association Logo
- Founded: 1859
- Founder: Daughters of Charity of Saint Vincent de Paul
- Type: 501c3
- Purpose: Breaking the cycle of poverty in the City of St. Louis
- Location: St. Louis, Missouri
- Region served: 63104, 63118
- Services: Self-Sufficiency Counseling, Client-Choice Food Pantry, Rental & Utility Assistance, Prescription & Co-Pay Assistance, Child Development Center, Thrift Store/Clothing Bank
- Method: Emergency Assistance, Early Childhood Education, Case Management
- Members: Board of Directors
- Key people: Reona Wise, President & CEO and Matt LeDuc, Chief Impact Officer
- Revenue: $2.4M
- Endowment: Sr. Annalee Faherty, D.C. Service Endowment
- Employees: 50
- Volunteers: 100
- Website: www.gasastl.org

The Guardian Angel Settlement Association is a non-sectarian, non-profit 501c3 in St. Louis, Missouri, offering programs which include family services, a food pantry, senior citizen support, and developmental childcare. Its mission is "to serve those living in poverty by helping them improve the quality of their lives and become economically independent.".

The agency serves over 3,800 children, families and senior citizens each year through emergency services at its Hosea House location and with licensed, accredited child care at its Child Development Center.

== History ==
Founded in 1859 by the Daughters of Charity of Saint Vincent de Paul, as an orphanage for young girls Guardian Angel Settlement Association is one of the longest-enduring charitable organizations in the St. Louis area.

In 1911, Guardian Angel Settlement Association became the first settlement house established by the Catholic Church.

In the 1910s Daisy E. Nirdlinger conducted business women's literary class.

In 1933, Guardian Angel Settlement Association became a member of United Charities, the forerunner of the United Way of Greater Saint Louis. It is now recognized as a charter member of the United Way and is one of its oldest member agencies.

In 1963, To make way for a new City park, the agency moves to the Darst-Webbe public housing project on Saint Louis’ Near South Side.

In 2001, Takes over the operations and management of Hosea House, a 25-year-old social agency.

In 2009, Agency celebrated 150th anniversary of serving the poor in St. Louis, August 31, 2009 with opening of new child development center.

In 2013, Guardian Angel Settlement Association established the Sr. Annalee Faherty, D.C. Service Endowment, the agency's first permanent fund.
