= Thomas H. Blake =

American politician

9th Commissioner of the General Land Office
- In office May 19, 1842 – April 16, 1845
- President: John Tyler; James K. Polk
- Preceded by: Elisha Mills Huntington
- Succeeded by: James Shields

Member of the U.S. House of Representatives from Indiana's 1st district
- In office March 4, 1827 – March 3, 1829
- Preceded by: Ratliff Boon
- Succeeded by: Ratliff Boon

Personal details
- Born: June 14, 1792 Calvert County, Maryland, U.S.
- Died: November 28, 1849 (aged 57) Cincinnati, Ohio, U.S.
- Resting place: Woodlawn Cemetery, Terre Haute
- Party: National Republican

Military service
- Allegiance: United States
- Branch/service: District of Columbia Militia
- Battles/wars: War of 1812 * Battle of Bladensburg

Thomas Holdsworth Blake (June 14, 1792 – November 28, 1849) was an American politician who served as a United States representative from Indiana from 1827 to 1829.

== Biography ==
Born in Calvert County, Maryland, Blake attended the public schools, and studied law in Washington, D.C.

=== War of 1812 ===
During his time in Washington, he served as a member of the militia of the District of Columbia which took part in the Battle of Bladensburg in 1814, during the War of 1812.

=== Early career ===
He later moved to Kentucky and then Indiana. He was admitted to the bar and commenced practice in Terre Haute, Indiana; he served as prosecuting attorney and judge of the circuit court, serving as the US Attorney for the District of Indiana from 1817 to 1818. He was also a businessman who served in the Indiana House of Representatives.

== Congress ==
Blake was elected as a National Republican to the 20th United States Congress, sitting from March 4, 1827, to March 3, 1829; he was an unsuccessful candidate for reelection in 1828 to the Twenty-first Congress.

=== Later career ===
On May 19, 1842, President Tyler appointed him as Commissioner of the General Land Office; he served until April 1845.

In later years, he was a resident trustee of the Wabash & Erie Canal, and he also visited England as a financial agent of the state of Indiana.

=== Death and burial ===
While returning from that trip, he died in Cincinnati, Ohio, on November 28, 1849, and was interred in Woodlawn Cemetery, in Terre Haute.

== Electoral history ==
General election 1826
Party	Candidate	Votes	%
Anti-Jacksonian	Thomas H. Blake	5,223	43.0
Democratic	Ratliff Boon	5,202	42.8
Independent	Lawrence S. Shuler	1,723	14.2

General election 1828
Party	Candidate	Votes	%
Democratic	Ratliff Boon	7,272	52.2
Anti-Jacksonian	Thomas H. Blake	6,671	47.8

== Notes ==
U.S. House of Representatives
Preceded by Ratliff Boon	Member of the U.S. House of Representatives from Indiana's 1st congressional district 1827–1829	Succeeded by Ratliff Boon
Political offices
Preceded by Elisha Mills Huntington	Commissioner of the General Land Office; 1842–1845	Succeeded by James Shields
