= Allen Hamilton =

American politician (1798–1864)

Member of the Indiana Senate
- In office 1860–1864

Allen County auditor, clerk, recorder
- In office 1831–1838

Fort Wayne postmaster
- In office 1825–1831

Allen County sheriff
- In office 1824–1826

Personal details
- Born: 1798
- Died: 1864 (aged 65–66)
- Resting place: Lindenwood Cemetery
- Party: Whig
- Spouse: Emerine J. Holman (m. 1820)
- Children: Andrew H. Hamilton
- Relatives: Edith & Alice Hamilton (granddaughters)
- Known for: Hamilton and Taber trading company

Allen Hamilton (1798–1864) was a founding father of Fort Wayne in Allen County, Indiana.

== Biography ==
Hamilton, an Irish emigrant, lived in Lawrenceburg in Dearborn County, Indiana, in 1820, when he married Emerine J. Holman, the daughter of prominent Indiana judge Jesse Lynch Holman. In 1823 the Hamilton family moved to Fort Wayne, where Hamilton was appointed deputy clerk in the U. S. Land Office. Hamilton also served as Allen County sheriff (1824–1826), Fort Wayne's postmaster (1825–1831), and as Allen County auditor, clerk, and recorder (1831–1838).

In the 1820s Hamilton partnered with Cyrus Taber to form Hamilton and Taber, an Indian trading company. The firm prospered as Hamilton won the trust and confidence of many Native Americans, in particular Chief Jean Baptiste de Richardville of the Miami. In 1834 and 1838 Hamilton was appointed to the U. S. Commission to Negotiate Treaties with the Miami in northern Indiana. In 1840 he served on the Commission to Extinguish Indian Titles in Indiana and was appointed the U. S. Indian agent to the Miami from 1841 to 1845. Hamilton was a Whig delegate to the Indiana Constitutional Convention in 1851 and was elected to the Indiana Senate in 1859, serving one term.

Until his death in 1864 Hamilton remained active in business as president of the Fort Wayne branch of the Indiana State Bank and of the Allen Hamilton National Bank in Fort Wayne. He resided at "Veraestau" and is buried in Lindenwood Cemetery.

In 1861 Hamilton donated land for a baseball field at the corner of Lewis Street and Calhoun Street in Fort Wayne. where the Fort Wayne Kekiongas and other teams practiced and played.

Hamilton was the father of Andrew H. Hamilton, a two-term member of the U.S. House of Representatives. He was the grandfather of author Edith Hamilton, whose books on mythology have become classics, and Alice Hamilton, a pioneer in American industrial medicine and the first woman on the Harvard University medical faculty. His great-grandson, Holman Hamilton, is noteworthy for a two-volume biography of President Zachary Taylor.
