= Elisha Mills Huntington =

American politician, lawyer, and judge (1806–1862)

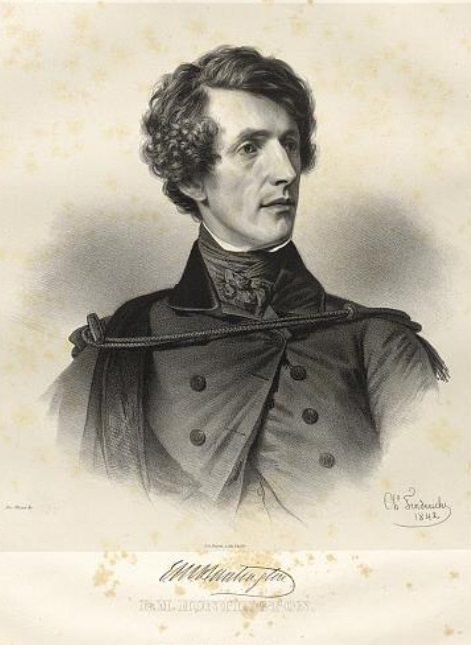
- Lithograph of Huntington by Charles Fenderich, 1842

Judge of the United States District Court for the District of Indiana
- In office May 2, 1842 – October 26, 1862
- Appointed by: John Tyler
- Preceded by: Jesse Lynch Holman
- Succeeded by: Caleb Blood Smith

Commissioner of the United States General Land Office
- In office June 2, 1841 – May 2, 1842
- Appointed by: John Tyler
- Preceded by: James Whitcomb
- Succeeded by: Thomas H. Blake

Personal details
- Born: Elisha Mills Huntington; March 29, 1806 Butternuts, New York
- Died: October 26, 1862 (aged 56) Saint Paul, Minnesota
- Party: Whig
- Spouse: Susan Mary Rudd (m. 1841; died 1853)
- Parent(s): Nathaniel Huntington; Mary Corning
- Relatives: Bob Huntington (grandson)
- Occupation: Lawyer, politician

Elisha Mills Huntington (March 29, 1806 – October 26, 1862) was Commissioner of the United States General Land Office and a United States district judge of the United States District Court for the District of Indiana.

== Early life ==
Huntington was born on March 27, 1806, in Butternuts, New York. He was a son of Mary (née Corning) Huntington (1763–1852) and Nathaniel Huntington (1763–1815). Among his siblings was Nathaniel Huntington, a member of the Indiana House of Representatives from 1827 to 1828, and James Huntington, a member of New York State Senate from 1856 to 1857.

His paternal grandparents were Dinah (née Rudd) Huntington and Eliphalet Huntington, a brother of Samuel Huntington, the 7th President of the Continental Congress and 18th Governor of Connecticut.

== Career ==
After receiving an education at Canandaigua, New York with his uncle Elisha Mills, at the age of fourteen he entered the law office of Mark H. Sibley (later a New York State Senator and a U.S. Representative) and read law. In 1822, he went to Indiana with his elder brother Nathaniel where he studied for four years before being admitted to the state bar. He entered private practice in Cannelton, Indiana from 1827 to 1830. In 1830, he was appointed the first prosecutor for the Seventh Judicial Circuit of Indiana, serving until 1832.

For the next four years, he was a member of the Indiana House of Representatives, serving from 1832 to 1836. He resumed private practice in Vigo County, Indiana from 1834 to 1837. He was Presiding Judge of the Indiana Circuit Court for the Seventh Judicial Circuit from 1837 to 1841. President John Tyler appointed him Commissioner of the United States General Land Office in Washington, D.C. from 1841 to 1842.

=== Federal judicial service ===
On April 26, 1842, Huntington was nominated by President Tyler to a seat on the United States District Court for the District of Indiana vacated by Judge Jesse Lynch Holman. He was confirmed by the United States Senate on May 2, 1842, and received his commission the same day. He served until his death in October 1862.

== Personal life ==
On November 3, 1841, Huntington was married to Susan Mary (née Rudd) FitzHugh (1820–1853). Susan, a widow of Clark FitzHugh, was a daughter of Ann Benoist (née Palmer) Rudd (a relative of former Vice President John C. Calhoun) and Dr. Christopher Rudd (a relative of U.S. Senator Charles Carroll of Carrollton). Together, they were the parents of:

- Robert Palmer Huntington (1842–1893), who married Alice Ford (1844–1919), a daughter of James Coleman Ford and Mary Jane (née Trimble) Ford, in 1867.
- Mary St. Clair Huntington (1844–1845), who died young.
- Mary Louise Huntington (1846–1872), who married William Pritchard Coleman (1844–1924) in 1870.
- Gertrude Huntington (b. 1848)
- Christopher Rudd Huntington (1850–1875), who died unmarried.
- Hetty Key Huntington (1852–1852), who died in infancy.

His wife died on December 3, 1853. After a pulmonary disease forced him to seek warmer climates to seek relief, Huntington traveled to Saint Paul, Minnesota and then Havana, Cuba before returning to St. Paul where he died on October 26, 1862. Per his wishes, his nephew John H. Rea of Indianapolis took his remains and he was buried at Saint Joseph Cemetery (he converted to Roman Catholicism, his wife's religion, late in his life) in Terre Haute, Indiana.

=== Descendants ===
Through his eldest son Robert, he was a grandfather of tennis player and architect Robert Palmer Huntington, who married Helen Gray Dinsmore and was the father of socialite, arts patron, and political hostess Helen Huntington Hull, the first wife of Vincent Astor of the Astor family.

Legal offices
| Preceded by Jesse Lynch Holman | Judge of the United States District Court for the District of Indiana; 1842–1862 | Succeeded by Caleb Blood Smith |
