= Lindenwood Cemetery =

Cemetery in Fort Wayne, Indiana, USA

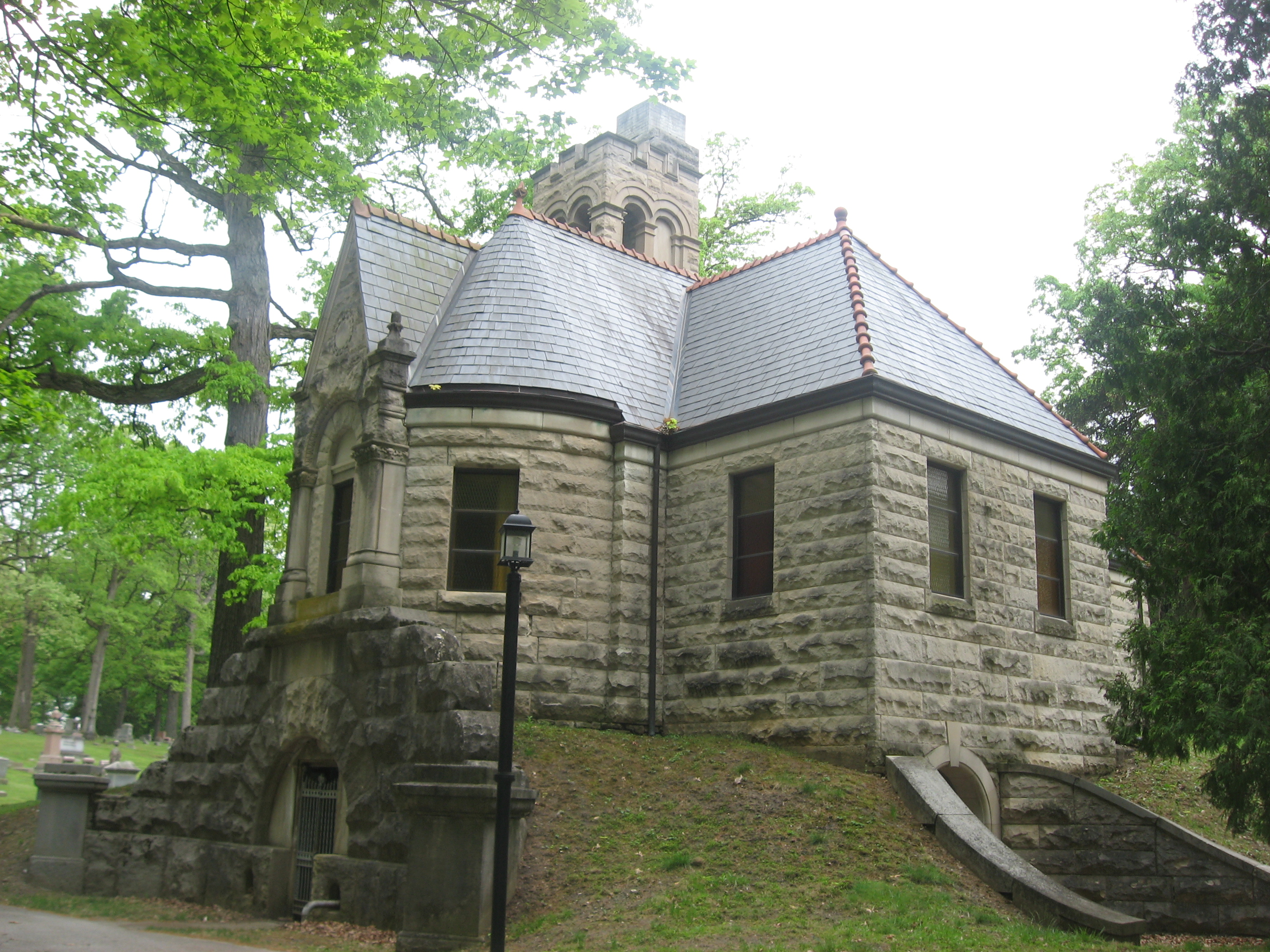
- Chapel at Lindenwood Cemetery
- Interactive map of Lindenwood Cemetery

Details
- Established: 1859
- Location: 2324 West Main Street, Fort Wayne, Indiana, 46808
- Country: United States
- Coordinates: 41.080°N 85.175°W
- Owned by: Dignity Memorial
- Size: 175 acres (71 ha)
- No. of graves: 74,000
- Website: www.dignitymemorial.com/lindenwood-cemetery/en-us/history.page
- Find a Grave: Lindenwood Cemetery
- The Political Graveyard: Lindenwood Cemetery
- Lindenwood Cemetery
- U.S. National Register of Historic Places
- Area: 180 acres (73 ha)
- Architect: Chislett, John; Doswell, John
- Architectural style: Romanesque
- NRHP reference No.: 78000043
- Added to NRHP: February 17, 1978

Lindenwood Cemetery is a rural cemetery operated by Dignity Memorial in Fort Wayne, Indiana, established in 1859. With over 74,000 graves and covering 175 acres (0.71 km^{2}), it is one of the largest cemeteries in Indiana.

Famous interments include some of the most important political figures from Fort Wayne history including Samuel Hanna (1797– 1866), Jesse L. Williams (1807–1886), Allen Hamilton (1798–1864), Colonel George W. Ewing (1804–1866), Paul Frank Baer (1893–1930), Daisy E. Nirdlinger (1879–1950) and Arthur "Art" Roy Smith (1890–1926).

Isaac De Groff Nelson helped to incorporate Lindenwood Cemetery, where a monument was built to him.

Lindenwood was placed on the National Register of Historic Places on February 17, 1978.
