= Benjamin Parke =

American judge

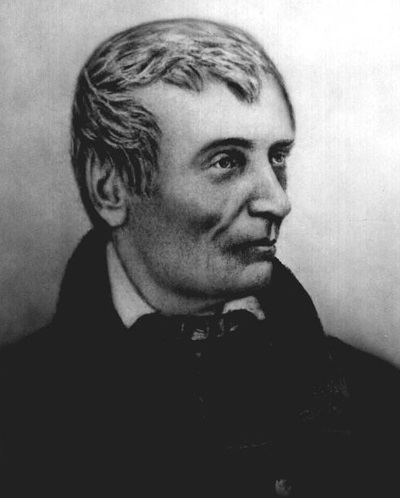

Judge of the United States District Court for the District of Indiana
- In office March 6, 1817 – July 12, 1835
- Appointed by: James Monroe
- Preceded by: Seat established
- Succeeded by: Jesse Lynch Holman

Delegate to the U.S. House of Representatives from the Indiana Territory's at-large district
- In office December 12, 1805 – March 1, 1808
- Preceded by: Constituency established
- Succeeded by: Jesse B. Thomas

1st Attorney General of the Indiana Territory
- In office 1804–1808
- Governor: William Henry Harrison
- Preceded by: Position established
- Succeeded by: John Rice Jones

Personal details
- Born: September 2, 1777 New Jersey, British America
- Died: July 12, 1835 (aged 57) Salem, Indiana, U.S.
- Party: Federalist

Benjamin Parke (September 2, 1777 – July 12, 1835) was an American lawyer, politician, militia officer, businessman, treaty negotiator in the Indiana Territory who also served as a United States federal judge in Indiana after it attained statehood in 1816. Parke was the Indiana Territory's attorney general (1804–1808); a representative to the territory's first general assembly (1805); its first territorial delegate to the United States House of Representatives (1805–1808); one of the five Knox County delegates to the Indiana constitutional convention of 1816; and a territorial court judge (1808–1816). After Indiana attained statehood, Parke served as the first United States District Judge of the United States District Court for the District of Indiana (1817–1835).

In addition to his service in Indiana's territorial and state government, Parke participated in the local militia, attaining the rank of colonel under the command of William Henry Harrison, and participated in the Battle of Tippecanoe during the War of 1812. Parke was also active in civic and educational affairs. He was a founder of the public library at Vincennes, Indiana, and a founder and member of the board of trustees of Vincennes University. In 1816, he helped select the township in what became Monroe County, Indiana, for the use of a state seminary, which later became Indiana University in Bloomington. Parke also served as the first President of the Indiana Historical Society (1830–1835).

== Early life and education ==
Parke, the son of a farmer, was born in New Jersey on September 2, 1777. He received a limited education and left home at the age of twenty. In 1797 he moved to Lexington, Kentucky, where he read law in the office of James Brown and was admitted to the bar in 1799.

== Marriage and family ==
Parke married Elizabeth "Eliza" Barton in Lexington. The couple had two children, a son, Barton, and a daughter, Sarah. Sarah married Abram (or Abraham) Hite of Louisville, Kentucky, and had one son. After Sarah died, Parke and his wife raised their grandson. Parke's son and grandson died during a cholera epidemic in 1833, leaving Parke with no heirs.

== Career ==
=== Early years ===
Around 1800–1801, Parke and his wife moved to Vincennes, the capital of the Indiana Territory, where he engaged in private law practice 1804. After Parke befriended William Henry Harrison, the governor of the Indiana Territory, he served in several positions in the territorial government.

Governor Harrison appointed Parke as Attorney General of the Indiana Territory. He served in that capacity from 1804 to 1808. In 1805, Parke was elected as one of the two Knox County representatives to the lower house of Indiana's first territorial legislature, which met at Vincennes on July 20, 1805. Parke, a federalist and Governor Harrison's political ally, was a supporter of slavery and indenturing laws in the territory that were being debated at the time.

=== Congressional delegate ===
In 1805, the Indiana territorial legislature elected Parke as its first territorial representative to the United States House of Representatives. Parke was reelected to the post in 1807 and served in the 9th and 10th United States Congresses from December 12, 1805, until March 1, 1808. Parke resigned prior to his appointment as a territorial judge and accepting a position on Governor Harrison's staff.

While serving in Congress and in response to requests from his constituents, Parke asked that body to amend the Northwest Ordinance to pass legislation permitting slavery in Indiana, but the effort was unsuccessful.

=== Territorial judge and militia leader ===
President Thomas Jefferson appointed Parke as a Judge for the Indiana Territory in 1808. He served in that post until 1816, when Indiana became a state.

During Tecumseh's War and the War of 1812, Parke joined the Indiana Territory's militia and rose through the ranks as a captain and major, before attaining the rank of colonel and serving on the staff of General Harrison, who was also the territorial governor. Parke initially served as a captain of a company of Indiana Light Dragoons and fought at the Battle of Tippecanoe in 1811. He was promoted to major and took command of the cavalry after Major Joseph Hamilton Daveiss was killed on November 7, 1811.

After the war, Parke returned to his position as a territorial judge. In 1816, he was named presiding judge of the Indiana Circuit Court, First Judicial Circuit, and served in that role until 1817, when President James Madison appointed him as a United States federal judge.

=== Treaty negotiator ===
In 1816, Parke and Thomas Posey negotiated a treaty with the Wea and Kickapoo people. Two years later, President Madison appointed Parke, Lewis Cass, and Indiana governor Jonathan Jennings as commissioners to negotiate the Treaty of Saint Mary's (also called the New Purchase treaty) with the Lenape, the Miami, and other tribes. Under the terms of this treaty, the Delaware gave up their right to occupy land in Indiana, while the Miami agreed to relinquish more than seven million acres of their tribal lands in Ohio and Indiana.

=== Indiana constitutional convention delegate, 1816 ===
During the move towards statehood, Parke served as one of the forty-three delegates, and one of the five from Knox County, who attended the constitutional convention at Corydon in June 1816. During the convention Parke was one of the leaders of the federalist minority that initially opposed statehood; however, when the majority voted in favor of statehood, Parke took active part in the convention proceedings and helped draft Indiana's first state constitution.

Parke was among the nine-member committee that drafted Article V of the constitution, which outlined the judicial branch of state government. Parke also served as chair of a select committee to redraft the article's initial version, which defined the state's Supreme Court, circuit courts, and other courts that the Indiana General Assembly might choose to establish. Parke was also among the signers of the new constitution, which the delegates adopted on June 29, 1816, during the final day of the convention.

=== State and Federal judicial service ===
The Indiana General Assembly designated Parke as one of the three presiding judges of the first (western) district for Indiana.

Following the admission of Indiana to the Union on December 11, 1816, Parke was nominated by President James Monroe on March 5, 1817, to the United States District Court for the District of Indiana, to a new seat authorized by 3 Stat. 390. He was confirmed by the United States Senate on March 5, 1817, and received his commission on March 6, 1817. His service terminated on July 12, 1835, due to his death.

== Other interests ==
During his early years in Vincennes, Parke was a founder of the town's public library and Vincennes University. He was also a member of the university's first board of trustees.

Parke was appointed as the Monroe County sales agent and became a land speculator in Bloomington, although he never lived there.

== Later years ==
In the 1820s, Parke suffered severe financial losses as a result of his involvement with the Vincennes Steam Mill Company. Parke was named an agent of the company in 1821; however, the mill burned the following year under mysterious circumstances, destroying the company's paper assets in the Vincennes State Bank, which Parke also organized with other investors. The bank failed and Parke was the only one of the mill company's and bank's officers to accept financial responsibility for the debts. He sold his property in Vincennes and used the proceeds to pay creditors. Parked retired to a modest home in Salem, Indiana, and spent the remainder of his life repaying the debts while he continued to serve as a United States District Court judge.

In December 1830, Parke was elected as the first president of the Indiana Historical Society. He served in that capacity until his death in 1835. Parker's successor was Samuel Merrill. Parke also helped establish a law library at Indianapolis, Indiana.

Parke's health failed during his later years. He suffered from tubercular consumption (tuberculosis) and paralysis of his right side.

== Death and legacy ==
Parke died at Salem, Washington County, Indiana, on July 12, 1835. He is buried at Crown Hill Cemetery in Salem.

Parke was known among his peers for his honesty and integrity and as an example to others for his devotion to civic duty and useful public service.

== Honors and tributes ==
Parke County, Indiana, is named in Parke's honor.

== Sources ==
- Barnhart, John D., and Dorothy L. Riker (1971). Indiana to 1816: The Colonial Period. The History of Indiana. Vol. I. Indianapolis: Indiana Historical Bureau and the Indiana Historical Society. OCLC 154955.
- "Biographical Sketch" in "Benjamin Parke Papers, 1816–1818 Collection Guide" (PDF). Indiana Historical Society. Archived from the original (PDF) on April 21, 2016.
- Carmony, Donald F. (1997). Indiana, 1816–1850: The Pioneer Era. The History of Indiana. Vol. II. Indianapolis: Indiana Historical Bureau and the Indiana Historical Society. OCLC 37731656.
- "Chapter XI: Roll of Companies". Archived from the original on October 29, 2005.
- Gugin, Linda C.; St. Clair, James E., eds. (2006). The Governors of Indiana. Indianapolis: Indiana Historical Society Press and the Indiana Historical Bureau. ISBN 0-87195-196-7.
- McLauchlan, William P. (1996). The Indiana State Constitution: A Reference Guide. Reference Guides to the State Constitutions of the United States. Vol. 26. Westport, CT: Greenwood Press. p. 4. ISBN 978-0-313-29208-8.
- McMains, Howard F. (December 2010). "The Indiana Seminary Charter of 1820". Indiana Magazine of History. 106 (4). Bloomington: Indiana University: 356–80. doi:10.5378/indimagahist.106.4.0356.
- "Origin of Indiana County Names". Indiana Historical Bureau.
- "Parke, Benjamin". Index to Politicians. The Political Graveyard.
- "Parke, Benjamin, (1777 – 1835)". Biographical Directory of Congress. United States Congress.
- Woollen, William Wesley (1975). Biographical and Historical Sketches of Early Indiana. Mid-American Frontier (reprint ed.). New York: Arno Press. pp. 384–90. OCLC 1218324.* "Parke, Benjamin". Federal Judicial Center.* Ruegamer, Lana (1980). A History of the Indiana Historical Society, 1830-1980. Indianapolis: Indiana Historical Society. OCLC 8112123.

Legal offices
New office	Attorney General of the Indiana Territory; 1804–1808	Succeeded by John Rice Jones
New seat	Judge of the United States District Court for the District of Indiana; 1817–1835	Succeeded by Jesse Lynch Holman
U.S. House of Representatives
New constituency	Delegate to the U.S. House of Representatives from the Indiana Territory's at-large congressional district 1805–1808	Succeeded by Jesse B. Thomas
