= Caleb B. Smith =

American judge and politician (1808–1864)

Caleb Smith
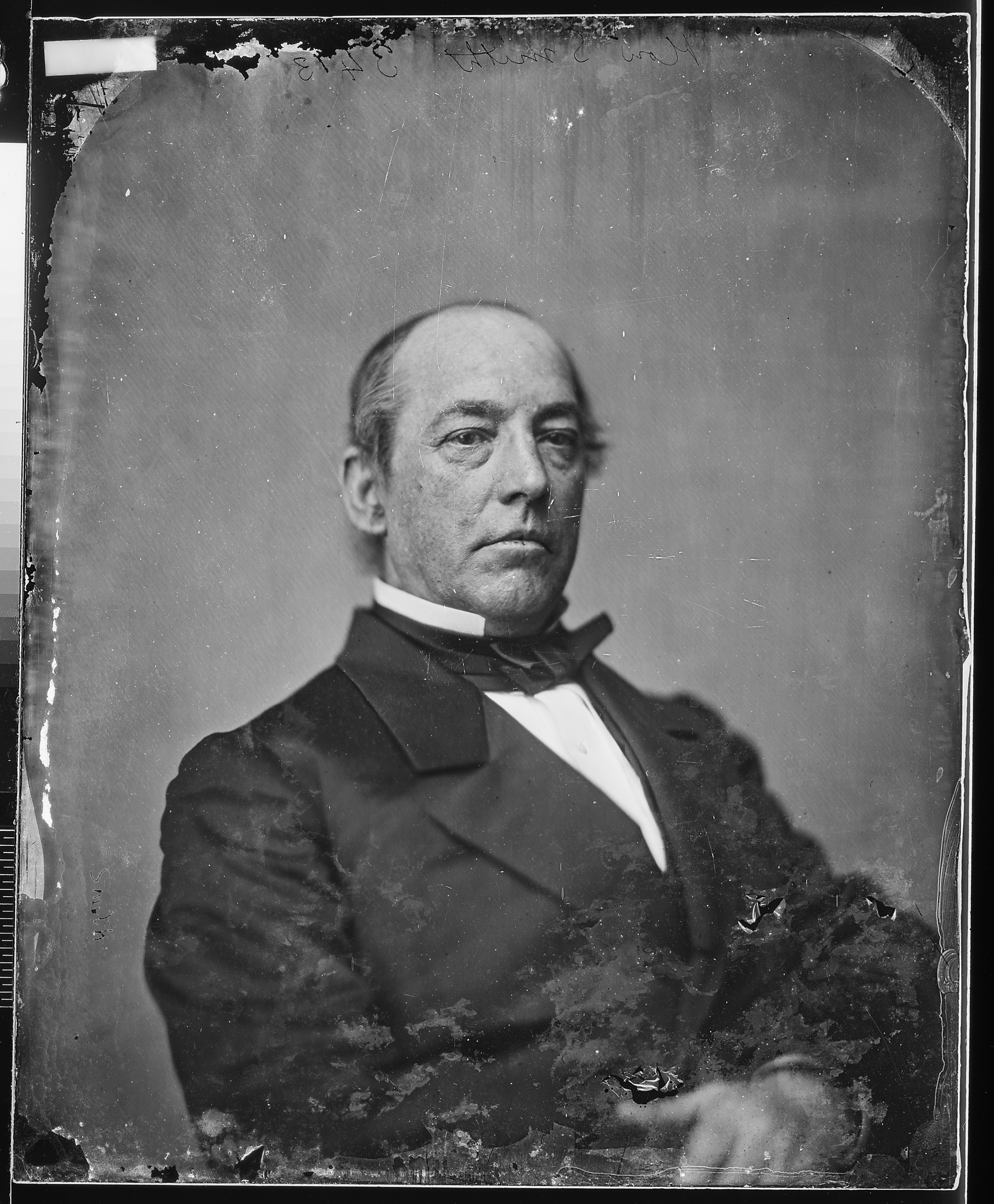
- Smith c. 1860–64

Judge of the United States District Court for the District of Indiana
- In office December 22, 1862 – January 7, 1864
- Appointed by: Abraham Lincoln
- Preceded by: Elisha Mills Huntington
- Succeeded by: Albert Smith White

6th United States Secretary of the Interior
- In office March 5, 1861 – January 1, 1863
- President: Abraham Lincoln
- Preceded by: Jacob Thompson
- Succeeded by: John Palmer Usher

Member of the U.S. House of Representatives from Indiana's 4th district
- In office March 4, 1843 – March 3, 1849
- Preceded by: James H. Cravens
- Succeeded by: George Washington Julian

Speaker of the Indiana House of Representatives
- In office December 7, 1835 – December 4, 1837
- Preceded by: James Gregory
- Succeeded by: Thomas Evans

Personal details
- Born: Caleb Blood Smith; April 16, 1808 Boston, Massachusetts, U.S.
- Died: January 7, 1864 (aged 55) Indianapolis, Indiana, U.S.
- Party: Whig (before 1854); Republican (1854–1864)
- Education: University of Cincinnati; Miami University

Caleb Blood Smith (April 16, 1808 – January 7, 1864) was a United States representative from Indiana, the 6th U.S. secretary of the interior and a district judge of the United States District Court for the District of Indiana.

== Education and career ==
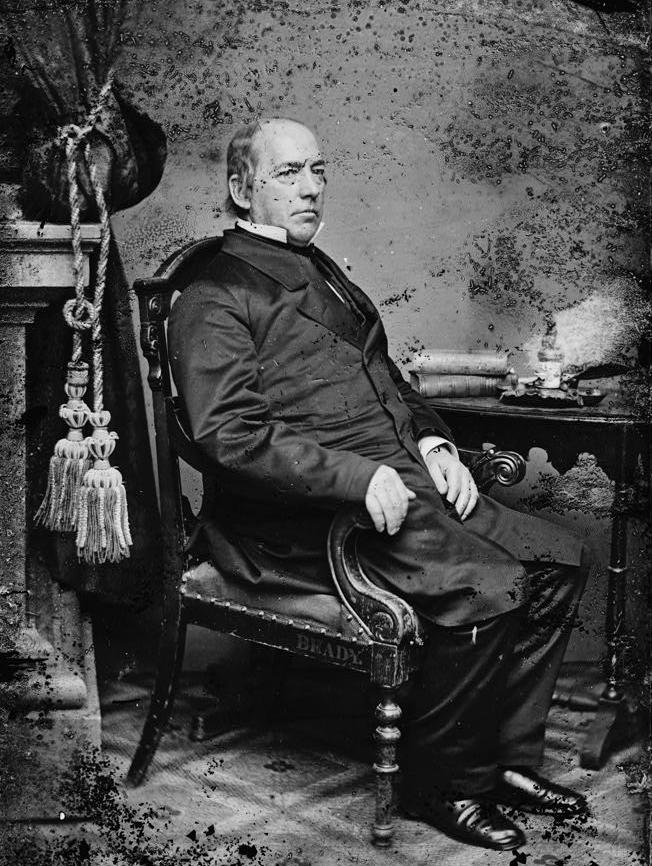
Smith c. 1860–64

Born on April 16, 1808, in Boston, Massachusetts, Smith moved with his parents to Ohio in 1814. He attended Miami University in Oxford, Ohio, from 1825 to 1826, Cincinnati College (now the University of Cincinnati) and read law in 1828. He entered private practice in Connersville, Fayette County, Indiana, from 1828 to 1843. He was founder and editor of the Indiana Sentinel in 1832. He was a member of the Indiana House of Representatives from 1832 to 1837, and from 1840 to 1841, serving as Speaker in 1836. He was Commissioner to collect assets and adjust debts for Indiana in 1837.

== Congressional service ==
Smith was an unsuccessful candidate for the 27th United States Congress in 1841. He was elected as a Whig from Indiana's 4th congressional district to the United States House of Representatives of the 28th, 29th and 30th United States Congresses, serving from March 4, 1843, to March 3, 1849. He was Chairman of the Committee on Territories for the 30th United States Congress.

== Later career ==
Smith was appointed by President Zachary Taylor to serve as a member of the board of commissioners to adjust claims against Mexico from 1849 to 1851. He resumed private practice in Cincinnati, Ohio, from 1851 to 1859. He was a member of the Peace Convention of 1861 held in Washington, D.C., in an effort to devise means to prevent the impending American Civil War. He was appointed by President Abraham Lincoln to serve as the 6th United States Secretary of the Interior from March 5, 1861, to January 1, 1863. However, Smith had little interest in the job and, with declining health, delegated most of his responsibilities to Assistant Secretary of the Interior John Palmer Usher. When Lincoln showed the draft of the Emancipation Proclamation to his cabinet, the conservative Smith considered resignation upon its public announcement, but accepted the decision in the end.

== Federal judicial service ==
Smith was nominated by President Abraham Lincoln on December 16, 1862, to a seat on the United States District Court for the District of Indiana vacated by Judge Elisha Mills Huntington. He was confirmed by the United States Senate on December 22, 1862, and received his commission the same day. His service terminated on January 7, 1864, due to his death in Indianapolis, Marion County, Indiana. It is unknown where Smith is buried. The reason for this is that Smith's wife, Elizabeth was terrified his body would be desecrated as the southerners were coming from south to north desecrating bodies in graves. He was first buried at Greenlawn cemetery but later moved by his wife to be put in Crown Hill Cemetery, when they opened up in Indianapolis. There is a mausoleum at Crown Hill in Indianapolis but Smith is not buried there.

SEARCH FOR SMITH'S BODY

An investigation into this and opening of mausoleum in 1977 proved that Smith was not there only his wife and child. In 1977 an excavation in the Connersville City Cemetery in Indiana in the Smith-Watton lot was carried out with permission from family members to locate Smith's body. Smith was also not found there.

It has been said that Caleb B. Smith's body is buried in a Connersville, Indiana cemetery. In 1977, John Walker, a Connersville, Indiana resident, received permission from the Smith family, Norvella Thomas Copes, and Nancy S. Hurley, and the city of Connersville, Indiana, to excavate the body of Caleb Blood Smith. Walker had an interest in President Abraham Lincoln, and discovered in reading about Lincoln that one of his cabinet members was buried in the city he lived in. An excavation was carried out in the Smith-Watton lot in November 1977, but Smith's body was not there. It was Smith's son-in-law William Watton Smith that was found. C.B. Smith's wife, Elizabeth B. Watton, had paid $500 for the choice of plots, in Crownhill Cemetery[1] and moved the body from Greenlawn Cemetery to Crown Hill Cemetery in Indianapolis for fear of southern dissenters, the Sons of Liberty, desecrating his body and of local teens knocking over the markers in Greenlawn. A letter inquiring about the whereabouts of Smith's body found in the 1980s arose from a New York public library in the 1930s.

The letter was written April 24, 1936 by Louis J. Bailey, Chief Librarian of the Queens Borough Public Library in New York and sent a letter to a Miss Dunn, a librarian in Connersville, In. He inquired to Miss Dunn in regards to the location of Smith's body. In that letter he states that He enclosed a letter from Senator New about Smith to her. Louis talks of records saved in the Indiana Library from Green Lawn Cemetery, where C.B.Smith was originally buried,(because Crown Hill cemetery had not yet opened) and discusses possible locations, misspellings of the Watton name. (Walton and Watton). Caleb Smiths wife was Elizabeth Watton, but few have it listed as Walton. The correct spelling is WATTON. Lincoln Memorial University has also inquired about the location of Smiths' body, in a letter to my grandfather, John Walker.

A 55-page research paper by John Walker on Smith reveals evidence that was discovered in 2009 listing names of those who have researched and written their findings on Caleb Smith. Offering possibilities of his being buried in someone else's grave, secret midnight burials, curses, and other findings, this paper has much to offer in the way of newspaper articles, letters, and family tales of where he is buried.

== Freemason ==
Smith became a Freemason in Warren Lodge No. 15 at Connersville in 1829. He would go on to serve as Grand Master of the Grand Lodge of Indiana in 1837. Today, the highest award presented by the Grand Lodge of Indiana is the Caleb B. Smith Medal of Honor. Today Smith's former home, Also known as Elmhurst in Connersville Indiana is the home of the Connersville Masonic Lodge #15 that went into operation in 1940. Smith's former home is on the national register of Historic Homes.

== Sources ==
- United States Congress. "Caleb B. Smith (id: S000519)". Biographical Directory of the United States Congress.
- "Caleb B. Smith Papers, 1849-1862, Collection Guide" (PDF). Indiana Historical Society. 2004-11-01. Archived from the original (PDF) on 2012-08-19.
- The Department of Everything Else: Highlights of Interior History Archived 2006-03-28 at the Wayback Machine (1989)
- "Weird Mystery" a story about Caleb Blood Smith, can be found at http://www.libraries.iub.edu Archived 2015-07-27 at the Wayback Machine by typing in the search bar. This is a story written by John Walker and co-written by Cynthia Long, John Walker's granddaughter.
- "Smith, Caleb Blood" . Appletons' Cyclopædia of American Biography. 1900.
- Sanford, Wayne L. "Cemeteries" The Encyclopedia of Indianapolis. Bloomington: Indiana University Press, 1994. googlebooks Retrieved May 21, 2009
- https://archive.org/details/WeirdMystery/page/n35/mode/2up?view=theater

Political offices
Preceded by James Gregory	Speaker of the Indiana House of Representatives; 1835–1837	Succeeded by Thomas Evans
Preceded by Jacob Thompson	United States Secretary of the Interior; 1861–1863	Succeeded by John Palmer Usher
U.S. House of Representatives
Preceded by James H. Cravens	Member of the U.S. House of Representatives from Indiana's 4th congressional district 1843–1849	Succeeded by George Washington Julian
Legal offices
Preceded by Elisha Mills Huntington	Judge of the United States District Court for the District of Indiana; 1862–1864	Succeeded by Albert Smith White
