= Utah, Indiana =

Coordinates: 39°03′39″N 84°53′53″W

Utah is a populated location in Dearborn County, Indiana, in the United States.

== History ==
It was likely named in commemoration of the Utah Territory.
