= Veraestau =

Historic house in Indiana, United States

- U.S. National Register of Historic Places
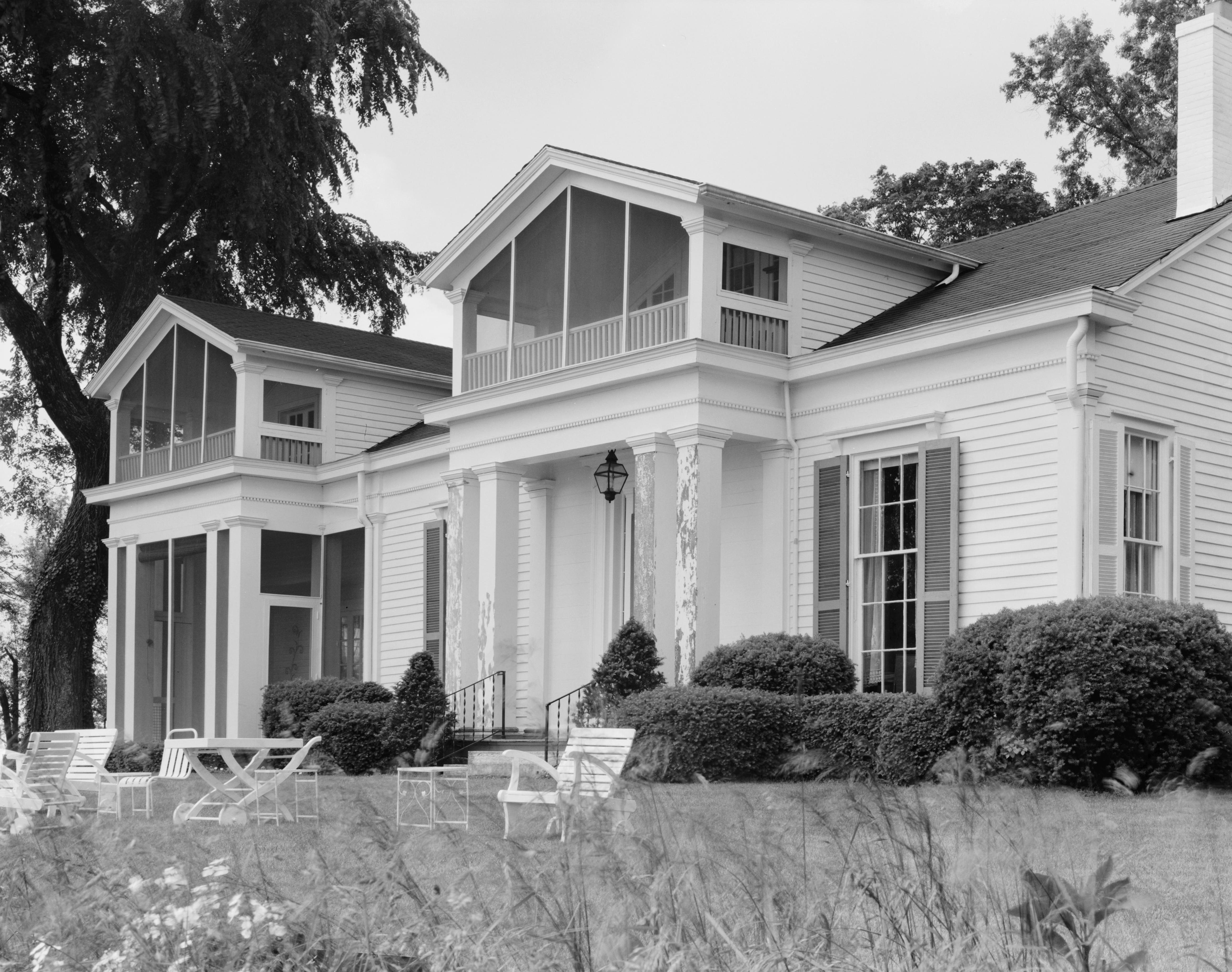
- Veraestau, HABS photo, 1983

- Location within Indiana Location within the United States
- Location: 1 mile south of Aurora on State Road 56, Center Township, Dearborn County, Indiana
- Coordinates: 39°02′33″N 84°53′44″W
- Area: 148.6 acres (60.1 ha)
- Built: 1838
- Architect: Hamilton, James Montgomery; Deeken, Henri
- Architectural style: Greek Revival
- NRHP reference No.: 73000013
- Added to NRHP: April 11, 1973

Veraestau is a historic home located in Center Township, Dearborn County, Indiana. It was built in 1838, and is a two-story, Greek Revival style brick and frame dwelling. It incorporates an earlier brick extension to the original 1810 log cabin that burned in 1838. A two-story addition was built in 1913, and a three-room brick addition to it in 1937. Also on the property are the contributing stable and carriage house (1937), Indian mound, family cemetery, and the remains of a kiln. The original house was built by Jesse Lynch Holman (1784–1842). Veraestau was also the birthplace of his son Congressman William S. Holman (1822–1897) and home of his son-in-law Allen Hamilton (1798–1864), who built the 1838 house.

It was added to the National Register of Historic Places in 1973.

Veraestau is owned by Indiana Landmarks and serves as their Southeast field office. It is available for rental.
