= Magic minute =

Custom in U.S. House of Representatives

The magic minute, or leadership minute, is a custom in the United States House of Representatives that allows party leaders to speak for as long as they wish, in contrast with other members, who have to adhere to strict time limits. The convention was notably used by Nancy Pelosi, Kevin McCarthy, and Hakeem Jeffries in 2018, 2021, and 2025 respectively, to speak for records of over eight hours.

== Background ==
Speeches one minute in length are allowed before or after legislative sessions every day. The members are asked to stay within a 300 word limit. The speeches are granted with permission from the Speaker. During legislative debate, the bill managers, usually the chairman and ranking members, yield the allotted debate time to members of their caucus ("I yield to the Hon. Member x minutes"). This time-limit is observed and enforced by the Speaker.

The magic minute is distinct from the Senate filibuster. Only the House speaker, majority leader, and minority leader are afforded this privilege and their speeches are considered to have taken the nominal time yielded, regardless of actual length. This has the effect of not taking up other members' allotted times. The House parliamentarian has advised in response to queries regarding time limits that "it is the custom of the House to hear the leader's remarks" and that party leaders had "used a customary amount of time" in answer to parliamentary inquiries about how much time had elapsed since they began speaking.

The magic minute is not a positive rule found in the Rules of the House of Representatives, it is rather a custom of the House.

== History ==
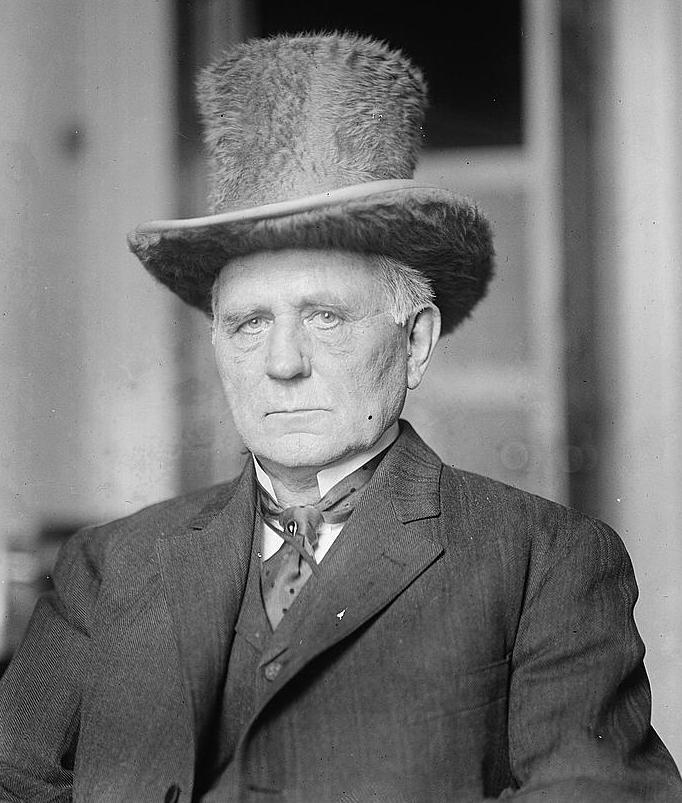
Champ Clark, who used the magic minute in 1909

The custom has been used by leaders of both parties. Champ Clark, the minority leader in 1909, spoke for five hours and fifteen minutes against tax reforms; this remained the record for over a hundred years.

In June 2009, minority leader John Boehner spoke for under two hours (Note: Sources disagree on how long the speech was, with Roll Call stating he spoke for 60 minutes and The Washington Post stating he spoke for "about 90 minutes".) opposing an energy bill, the American Clean Energy and Security Act.

In February 2018, Democratic minority leader Nancy Pelosi used the magic minute (calling it the "leadership minute") to speak for a then-record of eight hours and seven minutes, (Note: Although Roll Call states she spoke for eight hours and six minutes, The Washington Post, The Boston Globe, and The Independent state she spoke for eight hours and seven minutes.) calling for legislation protecting DREAMers. Much of the speech was spent reading their letters; the feat was called "pretty darned impressive" by Republican Speaker of the House Paul Ryan, who highlighted her use of high heels throughout the speech.

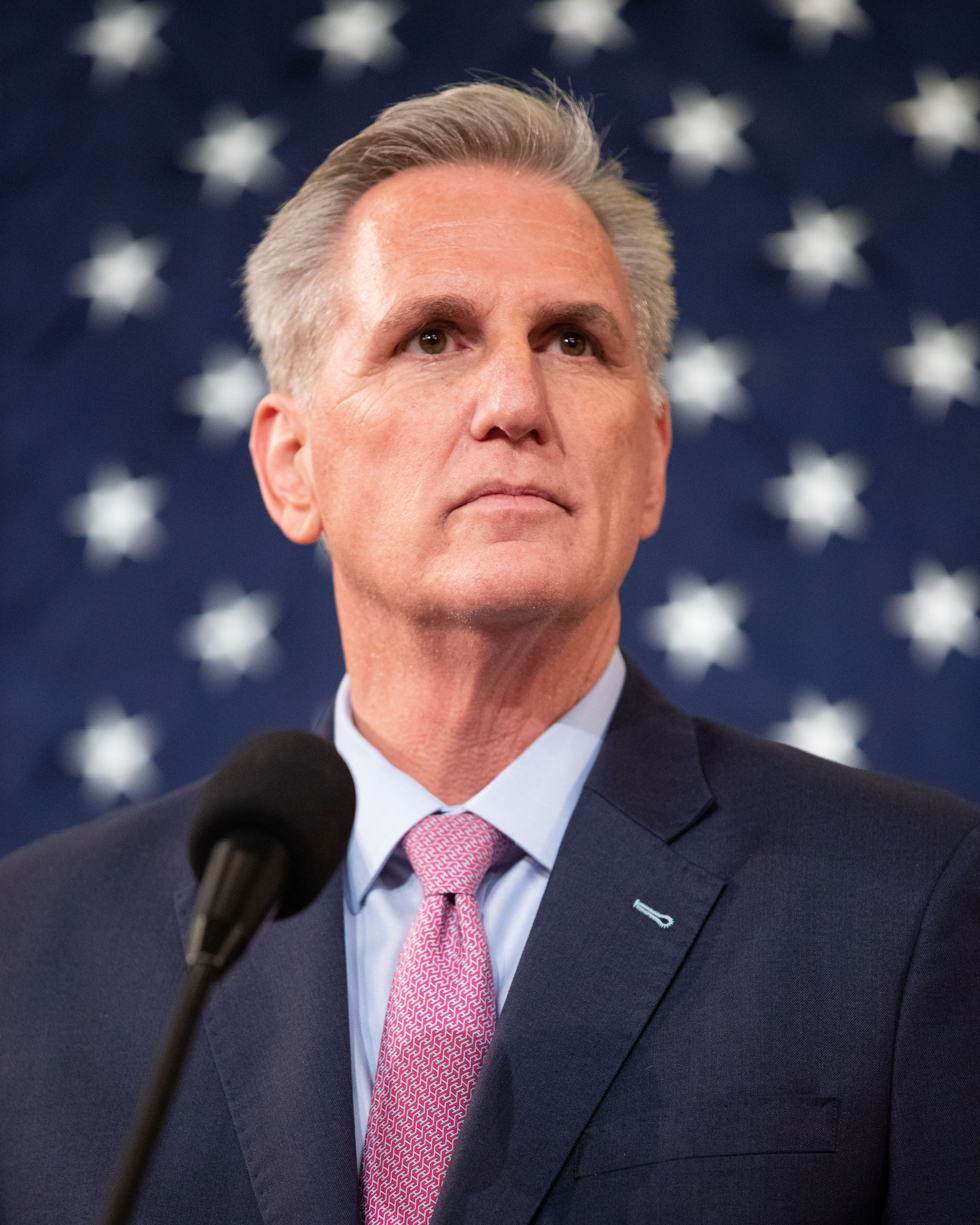
Kevin McCarthy used the magic minute to speak for over eight hours, in 2021

In November 2021, Republican minority leader Kevin McCarthy used the magic minute to speak for eight hours and thirty-two minutes, prior to the passage of President Joe Biden's Build Back Better bill. During the speech, McCarthy mentioned how he became a Republican partly because of President Jimmy Carter's penchant for wearing sweaters and how baby carrots were "just big carrots. They chop 'em and they charge you more and you buy them." Other talking points included how he wished he "could have been in Tiananmen Square and ... there knocking down the Berlin Wall", and how he could not "even afford to test drive a Tesla, and Elon is one of [his] best friends." In the aftermath of McCarthy's speech, breaking the record for longest in the House's modern history, White House Press Secretary Jen Psaki remarked that he did not talk about climate change or child care costs, despite the length of the speech.

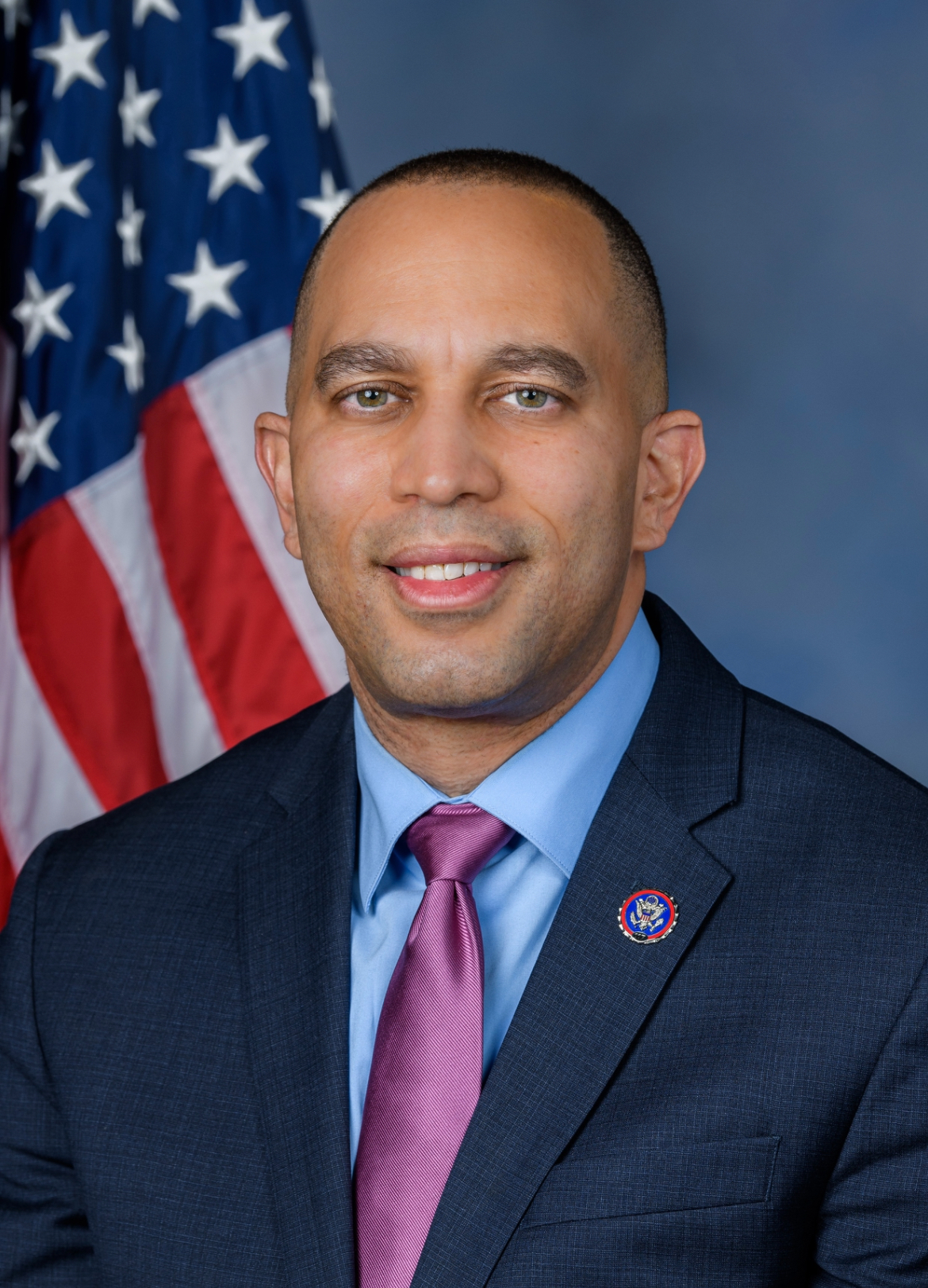
Hakeem Jeffries used the magic minute to speak for over eight hours, in 2025

On July 3, 2025, House Minority Leader Hakeem Jeffries used his time to delay a house vote on the "One Big Beautiful Bill Act," a reconciliation measure unanimously opposed by Democratic members of the House and Senate, again breaking the record. Jeffries spoke for eight hours and forty-four minutes.

== See also ==
- Procedures of the United States House of Representatives
