= William S. Holman =

American politician (1822–1897)

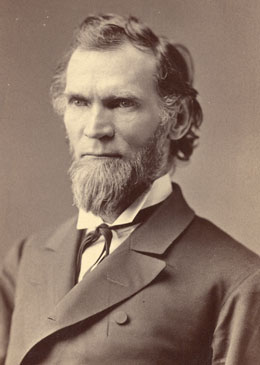

Chairman of the House Democratic Caucus
- In office March 4, 1889 – March 3, 1895
- Speaker: Thomas B. Reed (1889–1891); Charles F. Crisp (1891–1895)
- Preceded by: Samuel S. Cox
- Succeeded by: David B. Culberson

Member of the U.S. House of Representatives from Indiana
- In office March 4, 1897 – April 22, 1897
- Preceded by: James Eli Watson
- Succeeded by: Francis M. Griffith
- Constituency: 4th district
- In office March 4, 1881 – March 4, 1895
- Preceded by: Jeptha D. New
- Succeeded by: James Eli Watson
- Constituency: 4th district
- In office March 4, 1875 – March 4, 1877
- Preceded by: John Coburn
- Succeeded by: Thomas M. Browne
- Constituency: 5th district
- In office March 4, 1869 – March 4, 1875
- Preceded by: Morton C. Hunter
- Succeeded by: Michael C. Kerr
- Constituency: 3rd district
- In office March 4, 1867 – March 4, 1869
- Preceded by: John Hanson Farquhar
- Succeeded by: George W. Julian
- Constituency: 4th district
- In office March 4, 1859 – March 4, 1865
- Preceded by: James Bradford Foley
- Succeeded by: John Hanson Farquhar
- Constituency: 4th district

Member of the Indiana House of Representatives
- In office December 1, 1851–1852

County Prosecutor of Dearborn County
- In office 1847–1849

Probate Judge of Dearborn County
- In office 1843–1846

Personal details
- Born: William Steele Holman; September 6, 1822 Dearborn County, Indiana, U.S.
- Died: April 22, 1897 (aged 74) Washington, D.C., U.S.
- Resting place: River View Cemetery
- Party: Democratic
- Spouse: Abigail Knapp (m. 1843)
- Children: Rhoda Elizabeth; William Steele, Jr.; Paul; Pamela; Maude
- Parent(s): Jesse Lynch Holman; Elizabeth Masterson
- Education: Franklin College
- Profession: Lawyer, judge

William Steele Holman (September 6, 1822 – April 22, 1897) was a lawyer, judge and politician from Dearborn County, Indiana. He was a member of the Democratic Party who served four different stints as a U.S. representative from 1859 to 1865, 1867 to 1877, 1881 to 1895, and 1897, spanning sixteen Congresses. He is known for originating the Holman Rule, allowing amendments to appropriations bills to cut a specific program or federal employee salary. He died in office in 1897, a month after his last election.

== Early life and career ==
Holman was born at Veraestau, a son of Jesse Lynch Holman (1784–1842). He attended Franklin College from 1840 to 1842. In 1843, he was admitted to the Dearborn County bar association and served as probate judge from 1843 to 1846, followed by a two-year term as a prosecuting attorney from 1847 to 1849. Holman was elected to the Indiana House of Representatives in 1851 and 1852; from 1852 to 1856, he served as Judge for the Court of Common Pleas.

In 1843, Holman married Abigail Knapp. They had five children.

== Congressional career ==
As congressman, Holman was most known for his opposition to government spending, especially in subsidies and aid to private enterprises, notably the transcontinental railroad lines. Throughout the 1880s, he did what he could to have the federal government take back the public lands given to some of the largest companies, which had failed to fulfill the work promised on time. Nor did he have patience with the cattle barons who had fenced off nationally owned land as if it were their own domain. That made him the ideal choice to chair the Committee on Public Lands in the 1880s and his work at forcing railroad companies to disgorge probably restored millions of acres for actual settlers to take up. He hated any kind of government spending, from river and harbor improvements to salary increases for officeholders. "When Mr. Holman takes his walks abroad and sees Government clerks promenading the avenue in coachmen's coats and toothpick canes he 'objects,'" a Republican newspaper jeered. He also fought hard against congressmen raising their own pay, and in 1873 made himself one of the most active opponents of the so-called "back pay" grab, where lawmakers raised their salaries retrospectively. The following winter, he tried to bring the Democratic House caucus into line behind a resolution repudiating the grab and was so abused that, according to general reports, he went off on a several-day binge. ("Holman does go off on sprees & may be off now," his friend and colleague, Congressman Samuel S. "Sunset" Cox wrote a friend; "but he is honest & just above all men I ever knew here. He will stay 6 months sober; & then break. Don't allow him to be abused or slandered.") The big-navy advocates knew in him an inveterate enemy, and when he found a place on the Select Committee on American Ship-Building, the Washington Post growled that Americans had "a great, unutterable yearning ... to behold a ship made on the Holman plan." No doubt many such could be made, it thought—just big enough to be hung on watch-chains "or otherwise employed as curios." Admirers called him "the watchdog of the Treasury" and the "Treasury Cerberus," though a few critics noticed that the watchdog sometimes seemed to be taking a well-deserved nap when a bill-paying one of his constituents came up.

His frugality became legendary. One story his friends loved to tell about him was how nefarious interests, realizing that their only chance lay while the congressman was absent from the floor, waited until he was being shaved in the Capitol's barber-shop before offering their bill. In vain: Holman rushed into the chamber, his face covered with lather, to shout his objection. In 1885, he went west on an inspection tour with other members of the Committee on Indian Affairs. Unlike the rest, he refused to go by sleeping car, because it would cost the government too much, and slept in his seat instead. When they reached Fort Yates, in Dakota Territory, he balked at paying five dollars for the steamer ride to Bismarck, pointing out that the post had army ambulances and mules. "The mules are not earning anything," he argued. "They are idle; they will convey us." And so they did, much to the annoyance of his fellow-traveller, Congressman Joseph Cannon of Illinois, who tipped the wagon-driver to run over every single stone in the road as a punishment. As he arrived at Fort Lincoln, the commander proposed that they fire a salute. "No! no! for God's sake, don't!" Cannon protested. "He will object to the useless waste of powder."

In 1876, the Holman Rule was adopted which "empowers any member of Congress to propose amending an appropriations bill to single out a government employee or cut a specific program". With the vote of a majority of the House and the Senate, the pay of an individual federal government employee could be reduced or a specific program eliminated. The rule originally targeted patronage jobs, particularly customs collectors, but the federal workforce shifted over time to a civil service insulated from politics. In 1983, the rule was suspended as then-House Speaker Thomas "Tip" O'Neill Jr. (D-Mass.) objected to spending cuts. The early-2017 revival of the rule was credited to Rep. H. Morgan Griffith (R-Va.).

Holman's simplicity of life and lack of "swank," as nineteenth-century parlance went, made him notable in his time. He never appeared in Washington society, and when Congress adjourned, took his vacation at home among his cattle, horses, books and flowers. Visitors described his homestead as the model for southern estates, located on a high bluff where the Ohio River bent, and with a good view of three states (the others being Ohio and Kentucky). There he would rhapsodize about his livestock or show off his flower gardens and transplanted shade trees, with anyone who would listen. He died a poor man, never tempted by wealth or, for that matter, notoriety. Taking his chewing tobacco from a leather pouch, sitting tipped back in his chair and toying with a jackknife, the Indiana congressman looked more and more like a throwback to Jacksonian days, as the Gilded Age wore on. "Wherever Holman sits, or stands, there is a red sea of tobacco-juice," a reporter wrote in 1876. "Such tobacco chewing never was seen. He must get it by the wholesale. Standing in his place in the House his most energetic outbursts are suspended at the very climax by the necessity of disemboguing the red stream from his distended jaws. The ... cleaners of the congressional halls, declare that Holman requires a relay of spittoons three times a day, where other chewers are provided with one." He had a voice "pining, but not strong," a fellow congressman wrote. "The speeches, however, are meaty and full of flavor. He can probably say more in fewer words than any man in the House." Members found him kindly in personal life, and easy to approach. Taking pleasure in teaching first-termers the practical ways of getting things done, he gave advice freely, and, other Democrats agreed, his judgments were almost always sound. Many a member, unsure how to vote on a bill, would say, "Well, I'll vote with Holman. Then I'm dead sure to be right." He was, wrote Amos Cummings, "as trusty as the best combination lock."

Holman also made a dangerous adversary. His knowledge of the rules and routines of legislation surpassed that of anyone else, and he kept a close eye on the business of the day – "something that not one man in fifty in Congress can say," a reporter wrote—always aware of what would be coming up next. As of 1884, he boasted that he had missed just one vote in twenty years of service.

During his time in office, one of Holman's hallmarks was his contribution to the Forest Reserve Act of 1891, which repealed the Timber Culture Act of 1873 and authorized the President to set aside timber reserves to be "managed for the people" in the future. It is unclear who was responsible for this provision, but Holman had put forth an 1888 bill which used similar language to call for protecting public forests.

Defeated at last in 1894, Holman thought of staying in Washington and becoming a lawyer. There was good money to be made prosecuting claims; but when word got out to the press, the ex-congressman quickly changed his mind. He was afraid that people would think that he would be trading on his government experience and influence to act as a lobbyist. Instead, he went home to Indiana, where he ran for and won a final re-election, making him the longest-serving congressman in history.

Holman is buried at the Holman family plot in River View Cemetery near Aurora, Indiana in Dearborn County.

== See also ==
- List of members of the United States Congress who died in office (1790–1899)

U.S. House of Representatives
Preceded by James B. Foley	Member of the U.S. House of Representatives from Indiana's 4th congressional district 1859–1865	Succeeded by John H. Farquhar
Preceded by John H. Farquhar	Member of the U.S. House of Representatives from Indiana's 4th congressional district 1867–1869	Succeeded by George W. Julian
Preceded by Morton C. Hunter	Member of the U.S. House of Representatives from Indiana's 3rd congressional district 1869–1875	Succeeded by Michael C. Kerr
Preceded by John Coburn	Member of the U.S. House of Representatives from Indiana's 5th congressional district 1875–1877	Succeeded by Thomas M. Browne
Preceded by Jeptha D. New	Member of the U.S. House of Representatives from Indiana's 4th congressional district 1881–1895	Succeeded by James E. Watson
Preceded by James E. Watson	Member of the U.S. House of Representatives from Indiana's 4th congressional district 1897	Succeeded by Francis M. Griffith
