= Procedures of the United States House of Representatives =

Governing rules of procedure

The United States Constitution provides that each "House may determine the Rules of its Proceedings," therefore each Congress of the United States, upon convening, approves its own governing rules of procedure. This clause has been interpreted by the courts to mean that a new Congress is not bound by the rules of proceedings of the previous Congress.

Currently the procedures of the United States House of Representatives are governed by the Constitution, the House Rules, and Jefferson's Manual.

== Rules of the House ==
Prior to the adoption of the rules by the United States House of Representatives, the House operates under general parliamentary rules and Jefferson's Manual but these are not binding on the current House until they are approved by the membership of the current Congress. Historically, the current Congress will adopt the rules of the previous Congress and make any amendments they think are necessary to govern themselves.

The Rules of the House of Representatives are prepared by the Clerk of the House.

On December 6, 2016, in the final month of the 114th Congress, the House resolved that a revised version of the Rules would be printed for the 115th Congress.

== House Floor ==
=== Rules of Decorum ===
While on the floor of the House of Representatives, Members are bound by a number of rules on their behavior. Clause 5 of Rule XVII of the House Rules forbids:

- Exiting or crossing the hall while the Speaker is addressing the House.
- Passing between the Chair and a Member under recognition.
- Wearing a hat (This provision was modified in the 116th Congress to allow religious head coverings).
- Using a mobile electronic device that impairs decorum.
- Remaining by the Clerk's desk during roll calls.
- Smoking.

Clause 7 of Rule XVII forbids Members from "bring[ing] to the attention of the House an occupant in the galleries of the House". In practice, this prevents Members from talking about the visitors who are seated in the galleries above.

While the proscription on using electronic devices is more recent, some of the current House Rules originated in the early sessions of Congress. After independence, members of Congress would often wear their hats, as was the custom in the British Parliament, however this custom was abolished in the House of Representatives in 1837.

=== Daily business ===
The Speaker calls the House to order, the Chaplain of the House then offers a prayer, and the Speaker and House approves the legislative journal from the previous legislative day. After approval of the journal the members recite the Pledge of Allegiance, followed by the start of legislative business.

==== Order of priority of business ====
The House generally adheres to the following order of priority as outlined in the House Rules, specifically Rule XIV during the 114th Congress, but variations exist to this order as a result of House Rules or parliamentary rules that take precedence. The House may suspend this order and conduct itself as it sees fit consistent with House Rules and with Parliamentary procedure.

1. Prayer by the Chaplain.
2. Reading and approval of the Journal.
3. The Pledge of Allegiance to the Flag.
4. Correction of reference of public bills.
5. Disposal of business on the Speaker's table.
6. Unfinished business as provided in rules.
7. Consideration of bills called up by committees.
8. State of the Union
9. Orders of the day.

=== Speaking on the Floor ===
At the beginning of the legislative business day, after the prayer, approval of the previous day's Journal, and pledge of allegiance, the Speaker of the House may recognize members for one-minute speeches. The rules of the House do not specifically provide for one-minute speeches, rather they have evolved as a unanimous consent practice of the chamber, where members must ask for unanimous consent to address the chamber. Under the power of House Rule XVII, clause 2, the Speaker decides when to entertain unanimous consent requests to address the House for one-minute, and how many speeches will be allowed. There may be unlimited time for speeches, or pressing legislative business may necessitate a shorter time. If there are any limitations on time, the majority and minority leadership typically receive advance notice.

Members do not need to receive prior authorization to deliver a one-minute speech. To deliver a one-minute speech, members go to the front row of seats on their party’s side of the Floor and sit down. The Speaker will recognize members in turn, alternating between the majority and minority sides. When the chair announces that one minute has expired, the Member can finish the sentence underway but must then stop speaking. If the member cannot finish their remarks in one minute, they may insert additional material, either the full speech or extraneous materials, such as constituent communications or newspaper articles, into the Congressional Record. The inserted material appears in a distinct typeface in the Congressional Record, typically italics.

One-minute speeches have many uses in Congress, including allowing members to explain a new bill or a floor amendment they will offer later in the day. Representatives also use one-minute speeches to deliver eulogies and tributes concerning individuals and organizations in their congressional district. One minutes also provide Members with an opportunity to express their views on bills, policy issues, and local, national, and international events. These speeches are one of the few unrestricted options members of Congress have to express a position.

Not all members of Congress use one-minute speeches equally. In previous studies of legislative behavior, results suggest institutionally disadvantaged members of Congress, members who may have limited position-taking opportunities through traditional channels, are more likely to deliver a one-minute speech. These include junior members of Congress, members of the minority party in the House, ideologically extreme representatives, or non-committee chairs. These members of Congress have little opportunity to shape the legislative process, and therefore rely on alternative mechanisms, such as one-minute speeches to represent their constituents.

On February 7, 2018, Representative Nancy Pelosi (D-CA) delivered the then-longest one-minute speech since at least 1909, speaking for eight hours and seven minutes. Pelosi's speech took advantage of a rule that allows only top party leaders (the Speaker, the Majority Leader, and the Minority Leader) the right to speak as long as they want: this custom is called the leadership minute, or magic minute. In November 2021, minority leader Kevin McCarthy used the minute to speak for eight hours and thirty-two minutes, then the longest in the House's modern history, prior to the passage of Joe Biden's Build Back Better bill. In July 2025, minority leader Hakeem Jeffries again broke the record, prior to the passage of Donald Trump's One Big Beautiful Bill Act.

=== Introducing a bill ===
Any member of the House can introduce a bill at any time, while the House is in session, by placing (or most likely having a page place) a signed copy of the bill in the "hopper" at the side of the Clerk's desk on the Rostrum. Other members of the House may co-sponsor any bill to be introduced in the House by a member. These co-sponsors are not required to sign the bill and are considered under House Rules to be "original co-sponsors" and "additional co-sponsors" depending on whether they co-sponsored the bill at the time it was introduced or added their names to the bill after its introduction.

After the Clerk of the House receives the bill it is then assigned a legislative number, enrolled in the House Journal and printed in the Congressional Record and the Speaker of the House refers the bill to the Committee(s) with jurisdiction by sending the bill to the office of the chairman of the committee(s), and the Clerk of the Committee will add the bill to the Committee's calendar. The Speaker designates one of these committees as a "primary committee" with primary jurisdiction and responsibility for the bill and all other committee(s) are considered "additional committees." The Speaker may impose time limits on these committee(s) when appropriate - traditionally if the primary committee has reported out a version of the bill to the full House.

=== House floor action on a bill ===
Upon being reported out of Committee or removed from Committee by the House, a bill will be added to the House Calendar and any rules setting out how much time is allowed for debate, or other matters may be passed by the House in the form of a resolution. Generally, the supporters and opponents of a bill control debate time and may yield time to members who wish to speak upon the bill. In many instances this is the chairman and ranking member of the primary committee. If amendments are permitted under the rules governing floor action on the bill they are debated and voted upon at the time of the amendment (although common practice usually permits the House to debate several amendments without immediately voting on them, then voting back-to-back at the end of the series of amendments, which can either be voice votes or recorded votes). After the conclusion of time for debate and after all amendments have been disposed of, the matter is usually voted upon by the full House, unless the rules permit and a member moves to recommit (or commit) the bill back to committee. The chair will only recognize a member who is opposed to the bill for a Motion to Recommit and gives preference to members of the minority party. A motion to recommit may take two forms:

- with instructions to take some action and then report back the bill forthwith, which will result in the Committee chairman immediately re-reporting to the House the bill according to the instructions in the motion to recommit;
- without instructions, which leaves the bill in committee for reconsideration.

== Committees ==
It is in Committee(s) that bills get the most scrutiny and attention and that most of the work on a bill is done. Committees play an important role in the legislative process by providing members the opportunity to study, debate and amend the bill and the public with the opportunity to make comments on the bill. There are three types of House Committees, these are:

1) standing committees elected by members of the House,

2) select committees appointed by the Speaker of the House, and

3) joint committees whose members are chosen according to the statute or resolution that created that committee.

As the House Rules limit the amount of floor debate on any given bill the committees play an important function in determining the final content and format of the bill.

After the committee conducts any necessary research, and has debated and voted on any amendments that were offered in committee they may take one of three actions. These are reporting a measure to the full House with or without amendments, report the measure to the full House with a negative recommendation or fail to report the measure. The House may under certain rules remove the bill or measure from committee (see discharge petition) if the committee fails to report the measure to the House Rules Committee or to the full House and a negative report to the full House does not terminate the bill. The phrase that a "bill has been killed in committee" is not completely accurate as the full House always has options under the rules to remove the bill from Committee and to take action.

=== Standing committees ===
Standing committees are established at the time that the rules of the House are adopted or by amending the House Rules. The jurisdiction of each standing committee is specified in the House Rules. Under the House Rules the chairman and members of standing committees are selected through a two-step procedure where the Democratic Caucus and the Republican Conference recommends members to serve on Committees, the majority party recommends a Chairman, and the Minority Party recommends a Ranking Member and finally the full House can approve the recommendation of the Party Caucuses.

The Rules of the Democratic Caucus and the Republican Conference determine the nomination procedure of its own members. Rules of party nominations may therefore differ but approval by the House of these nominations is conducted according to House Rules. Seniority on a Standing Committee is based on the order of the members on the election resolution as approved by the House. The number of members who serve on a committee along with the party ratio of a committee is determined by the Majority and Minority Leaders of the House with the exception of the Committee on Ethics which is limited by the Rules to 5 majority members and 5 minority members.

=== Membership ===
The number of members on a committee and the ratio of majority/minority members is determined by the Majority party with consultation with the minority. According to House Rules members of the House of Representatives may serve on two committees and four subcommittees. Seniority on a committee is not based on the longest-serving member of the House but on their order of appointment to that committee by their respective party caucus. The Committee Chairman is usually the ranking majority member in order of seniority (order of appointment). If a member of the House ceases to be a member of his caucus then he ceases having membership on that committee. Independent members of the House may caucus with either the Republican Conference or the Democratic Caucus and thus be appointed to and serve on Committees. Current House Rules also stipulate that a member cannot serve as chairman of the same standing committee or subcommittee for more than three consecutive Congresses (six years).

=== Chairman and ranking member ===
The House Rules provide that the chairman of a committee presides over its meetings, maintains decorum and ensures that the committee adheres to the House Rules governing committees and generally acts in an administrative role respective to such issues as determining salaries of committee staff, issuing congressional subpoenas for testimony and issuing committee reports. The committee's minority may also issue a Minority Report at their discretion. Also, a committee chairman along with the ranking member generally control the time each receives on the House Floor respective to a bill that originated or was reported out of their committee. The ranking member is second to the chairman.

=== Committee staff ===
According to House Rules each Standing Committee may have up to 30 persons appointed to serve as professional staff, 2/3 of which are selected by the majority committee members and 1/3 of which are selected by the minority members. This allows each party serving in the Committee to have professional staff available to assist them in performing their committee assignments and duties.

== See also ==
- Holman Rule
