= Holman rule =

U.S. House of Representatives procedure

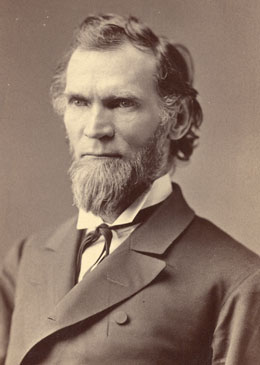
William S. Holman of Indiana originated the Holman rule in 1876.

The Holman rule is a rule in the United States House of Representatives that allows amendments to appropriations legislation that would reduce the salary of or fire specific federal employees, or cut a specific program. The rule, named after Democratic politician William S. Holman, had previous versions in effect from 1876 to 1895 and again from 1911 to 1983.

It was reinstated for the Republican-controlled 115th Congress from 2017 to 2019, and several amendments were proposed that progressed to a vote of the full House, but none were adopted. The rule was rescinded once more at the beginning of the 116th Congress upon Democrats taking control of the chamber, and was restored once Republicans retook the House majority for the 118th Congress in 2023.

== Effects ==
The rule is an exception to the prohibition against provisions in appropriations legislation that change existing law, and to the distinction between appropriations and authorization legislation. Prior to the rule's reinstatement in 2017, cuts could be made to agencies broadly, but not to specific programs or employees, and it appeared never to have been used to cut a specific worker's salary with the intent of incentivizing them to quit. The rule cannot be used if the reductions are contingent on other events, or to give broad authority to agency heads to fire workers.

The constitutionality of bills passed under the Holman rule has been questioned by legal scholars in light of the U.S. Supreme Court's ruling in United States v. Lovett (1946). That case dealt with an act of Congress, passed during the Red Scare's McCarthyism, that defunded the salaries of 39 employees accused of having Communist sympathies. The Court held that, under these circumstances, the Act was no "mere appropriation measure", but was effectively a bill of attainder prohibited by Article I, Section 9, of the Constitution.

== History ==
=== 19th century ===
The distinction between appropriations and authorization legislation dates back to an 1837 House rule. This rule came to be interpreted to allow salary increases, but not decreases, in appropriations legislation.

The Holman was first passed in 1876, named for Indiana Representative William S. Holman. Its original effect was to allow any provision germane to the bill's subject matter that retrenched expenditures, but in 1880 its scope was reduced to apply to "the number and salary of officers of the United States, the reduction of compensation of any person paid out of the Treasury of the United States, or the reduction of the amounts of money covered by the bill." The rule was eliminated in 1885, reinstated in 1891, and eliminated again in 1895. It was initially used to eliminate patronage positions prior to the establishment of the merit-based employment system.

=== 20th century ===
The rule was restored in 1911. This iteration of the Holman rule was part of Rule XXI, Clause 2 of the Rules of the House of Representatives, and stated that an amendment to an appropriations bill is allowed if it, "being germane to the subject matter of the bill, shall retrench expenditures by the reduction of the number and salary of the officers of the United States, by the reduction of the compensation of any person paid out of the Treasury of the United States, or by the reduction of amounts of money covered by the bill". Its text did not change before it was rescinded.

During this time it was used for targeted cuts to, and caps on, the number and salary of federal employees, though its use was rare in modern times. The rule was used to eliminate 29 customs positions in 1932 and another eight in 1939, to allow a provision reducing the number of naval officers in 1938, and to allow a 1952 amendment disallowing the filling of vacancies in independent agencies until the agency's workforce had been reduced by 10%.

It was removed in 1983 due to objections from Speaker of the House Tip O'Neill, by removing the language allowing amendments to reduce the number or salaries of employees, and restricting the circumstances in which it could be used.

=== 2017–2019 revival ===
The rule was reinstated as part of the rules package enacted at the beginning of the 115th Congress in 2017 for a period of one year, unless extended by Congress. The 2017 reinstatement of the law was a standing order not incorporated into the main body of the Rules of the House. It allowed during the 115th Congress "any provision or amendment ... that retrenches expenditures by—(1) the reduction of amounts of money in the bill; (2) the reduction of the number and salary of the officers of the United States; or (3) the reduction of the compensation of any person paid out of the Treasury of the United States."

It was championed by Freedom Caucus member Morgan Griffith, who favored empowering individual members of Congress to strategically reassign workers according to policy needs, and to cut programs perceived as wasteful. Republicans said that the rule change would increase accountability and streamline the appropriations process, and said they did not intend it as a broad change to the appropriations process.

Democrats criticized the revival of the Holman rule as undermining civil service protections, and allowing the possibility that specific individuals could be targeted for political reasons. Federal employee unions, such as the American Federation of Government Employees, raised similar concerns. The rule was also criticized for taking hiring decisions out of the hands of Cabinet and other members of the executive branch. Some Republicans also criticized the rule, such as Tom Cole, chairman of a House Appropriations Subcommittee.

There were several attempts to use the rule in 2017 as amendments to the fiscal year 2018 appropriations bills. A proposal offered by Morgan Griffith to eliminate 89 jobs at the Congressional Budget Office failed on July 26, 2017, on a vote of 116–309. There were also two additional amendments offered by Ron DeSantis that were approved by the House Rules Committee but did not receive a floor vote: one aimed at employees working on Guantanamo Bay Naval Base policy, as well as one for a single individual at the Army Corps of Engineers.

The Holman rule was extended to the end of the 115th Congress in March 2018. In April 2018, the Republican Study Committee budget plan supported use of the rule to remove positions considered unneeded. In June 2018, Paul Gosar proposed using the rule to cut the Western Area Power Administration Administrator Mark Gabriel's salary to $1 for alleged misconduct. This amendment failed by a vote of 139–276 on June 7, 2018.

The Holman rule was removed at the beginning of the 116th Congress in January 2019, after Democrats had taken control of the chamber.

=== 2023 revival ===
Following the 2022 midterms, the House Republican majority supported and adopted rules for the 118th Congress reinstating the Holman rule. The text of the provision is identical to the 2017 version.

In June 2023, Andy Biggs advocated using the Holman Rule to defund the Smith special counsel investigation.

During the July 2023 House Committee on Oversight and Accountability hearing that heard the claims of whistleblower David Grusch and retired U.S. fighter pilots Ryan Graves and David Fravor, into UFO reports and activity, Andy Ogles stated that he would be willing to advocate for invoking the Holman Rule to force the Department of Defense to disclose UFO-related or other hidden programs.

== See also ==
- Procedures of the United States House of Representatives
