= John H. Farquhar =

American politician (1818–1873)

John Farquhar

18th Secretary of State of Indiana
- In office February 1, 1872 – January 16, 1873
- Governor: Conrad Baker
- Preceded by: Norman Eddy
- Succeeded by: William W. Curry

Member of the U.S. House of Representatives from Indiana's 4th district
- In office March 4, 1865 – March 3, 1867
- Preceded by: William S. Holman
- Succeeded by: William S. Holman

Personal details
- Born: December 20, 1818 Union Bridge, Maryland, U.S.
- Died: October 1, 1873 (aged 54) Indianapolis, Indiana, U.S
- Resting place: Crown Hill Cemetery and Arboretum, Section 12, Lot 29
- Party: Republican

Military service
- Branch/service: Union Army
- Rank: Captain
- Unit: 19th Infantry of the Regular Army
- Battles/wars: American Civil War

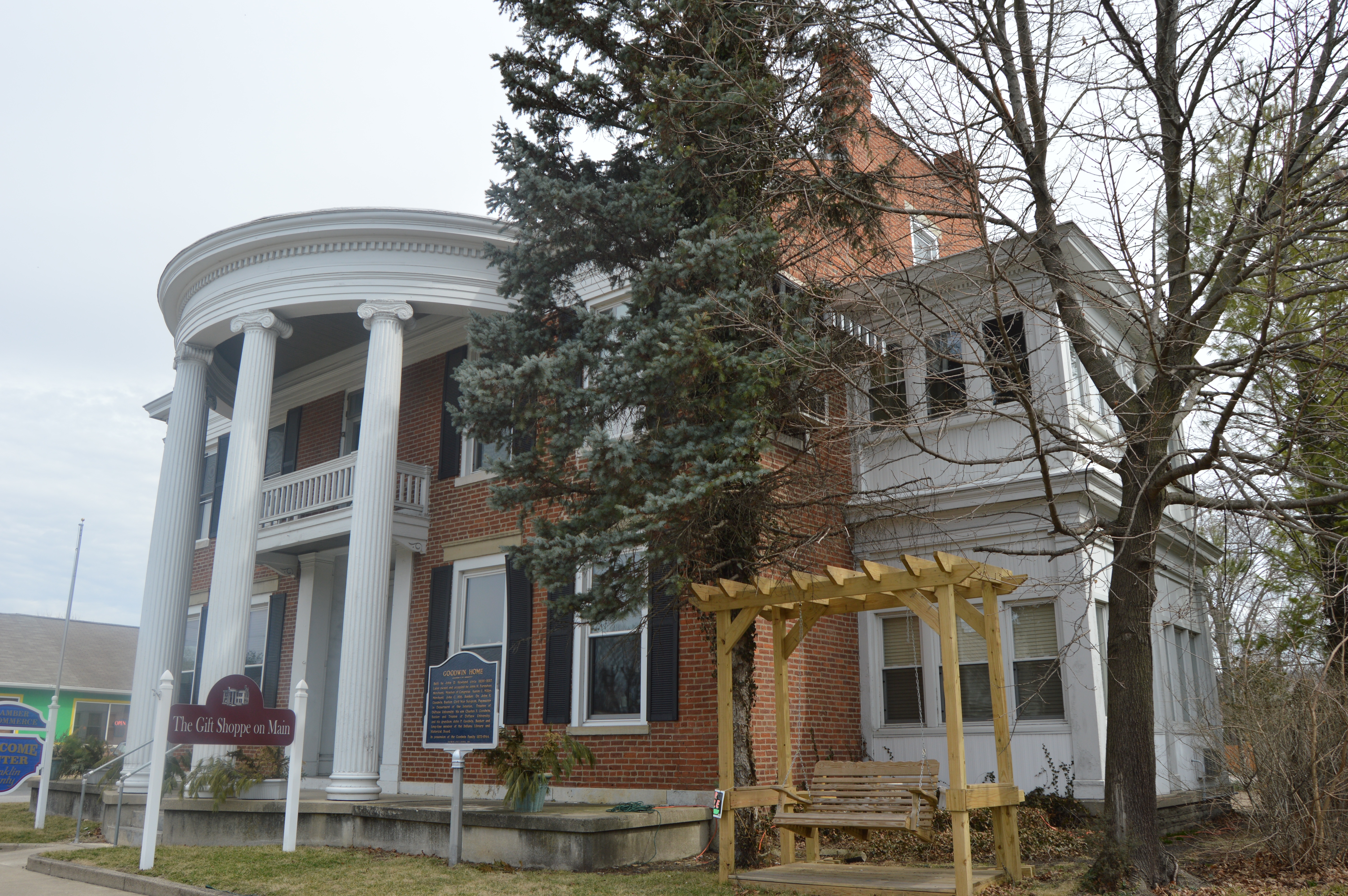
Farquhar's home in Brookville

John Hanson Farquhar (December 20, 1818 – October 1, 1873) was an American lawyer and politician who served one term as a U.S. representative from Indiana from 1865 to 1867.

== Early years ==
Born in Union Bridge, Maryland, Farquhar attended the public schools. He moved to Indiana with his parents, who settled in Richmond in 1833. He was employed as an assistant engineer on the White River Canal until 1840. He studied law.

== Career ==
He was then admitted to the bar where he commenced practice in Brookville, Indiana. He was also the Secretary of the State senate in 1842 and 1843. Chief clerk of the State house of representatives in 1844. He was an unsuccessful candidate for election in 1852 to the Thirty-third Congress. He served as captain in the Nineteenth Infantry of the Regular Army in the Civil War.

Farquhar was elected as a Republican to the Thirty-ninth Congress (March 4, 1865 – March 3, 1867). He was not a candidate for renomination in 1866. He moved to Indianapolis in 1870 and engaged in banking. He was appointed secretary of state by Gov. Conrad Baker.

== Death ==
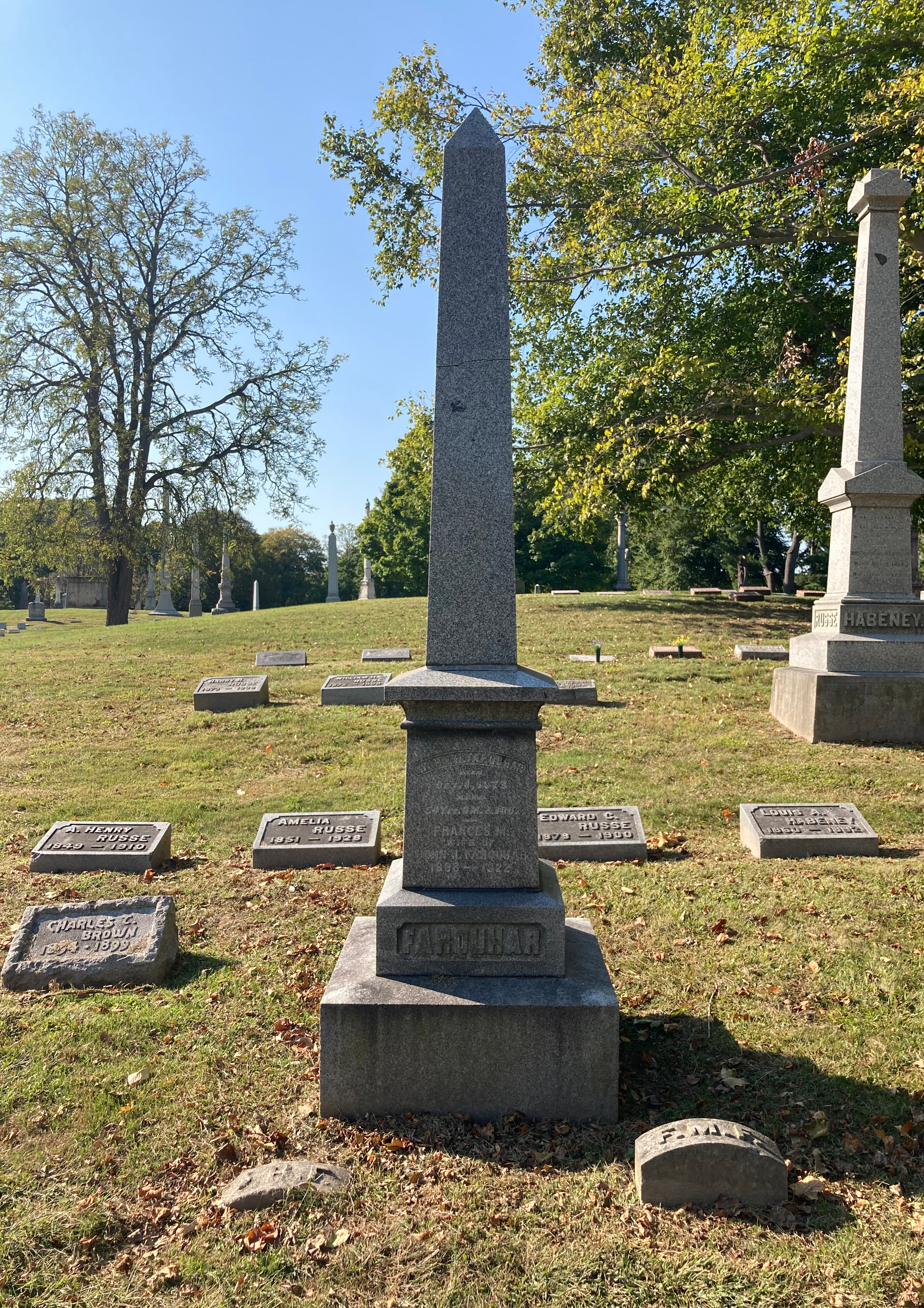
Farquhar's grave at Crown Hill Cemetery

He died in Indianapolis, Indiana, October 1, 1873. He was interred in Crown Hill Cemetery.

U.S. House of Representatives
| Preceded by William S. Holman | Member of the U.S. House of Representatives from Indiana's 4th congressional district 1865–1867 | Succeeded by William S. Holman |
Political offices
| Preceded by Norman Eddy | Secretary of State of Indiana; 1872–1873 | Succeeded by William W. Curry |
