= Speaker of the United States House of Representatives =

Presiding officer of the United States House of Representatives

- Seal of the speaker of the House

- Flag of the House of Representatives

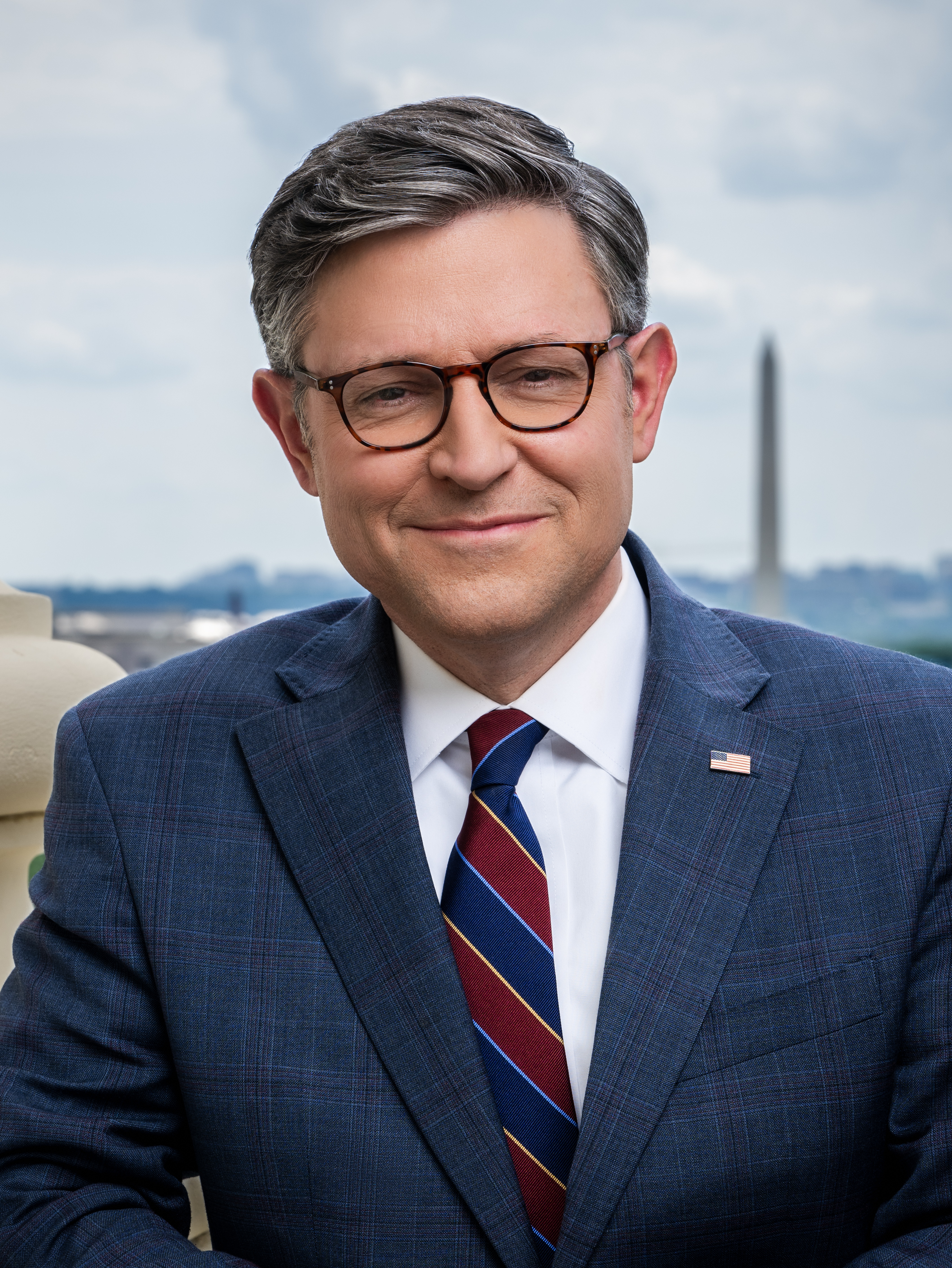
- Incumbent; Mike Johnson since October 25, 2023
- United States House of Representatives
- Style: Mr. Speaker (informal – male); Madam Speaker (informal – female); The Honorable (formal)
- Status: Presiding officer
- Seat: United States Capitol, Washington, D.C.
- Nominator: Party caucus / conference (primarily)
- Appointer: House of Representatives
- Term length: At the House's pleasure; elected at the beginning of the new Congress by a majority of the representatives-elect, and upon a vacancy during a Congress.
- Constituting instrument: Constitution of the United States, article I, § 2, cl. 5
- Formation: March 4, 1789; 237 years ago
- First holder: Frederick Muhlenberg
- Succession: Second (3 U.S.C. § 19)
- Salary: $223,500 annually
- Website: www.speaker.gov

The speaker of the United States House of Representatives, commonly known as the speaker of the House or House speaker, is the presiding officer of the United States House of Representatives, the lower chamber of the United States Congress. The office was established in 1789 by Article I, Section II, of the U.S. Constitution. (Note: "The House of Representatives shall chuse [sic] their Speaker and other Officers".) By custom and House rules, the speaker is the political and parliamentary leader of the House and is simultaneously its presiding officer, de facto leader of the body's majority party, and the institution's administrative head. Speakers also perform various other administrative and procedural functions. Given these many roles and responsibilities, the speaker usually does not personally preside over debates—that duty is instead delegated to members of the House from the majority party—nor regularly participate in floor debates.

The Constitution does not explicitly require the speaker to be an incumbent member of the House of Representatives, although every speaker thus far has been. If an incumbent member, the speaker also represents their congressional district and retains the right to vote. The speaker is second in the United States presidential line of succession, after the vice president and ahead of the president pro tempore of the Senate.

The 56th and current speaker of the House is Mike Johnson, a Republican from Louisiana.

== Selection ==
The House elects its speaker at the beginning of a new Congress, biennially, after a general election, or when a speaker dies, resigns, or is removed from the position during a congressional term. At the start of a new Congress, those voting to elect the speaker are representatives-elect, as a speaker must be selected before members are sworn in to office; the House of Representatives cannot organize or take other legislative actions until a speaker is elected.

Since 1839, the House has elected speakers by roll call vote. In practice, each party's caucus or conference selects a candidate for the speakership from among its senior leaders prior to the roll call. To be elected speaker, a candidate must receive a majority of votes from the members present and voting. If no candidate wins a majority, the roll call is repeated until a speaker is elected. Representatives are free to vote for someone other than the candidate nominated by their party but generally do not, as the outcome of the election effectively demonstrates which party has the majority and consequently will organize the House.

A representative who chooses to vote for someone other than his or her party's nominee usually votes for someone else in his or her party or votes "present", in which case his or her vote does not count in tallying the vote positively or negatively. Anyone who votes for the other party's candidate could face serious consequences, as was the case when Democrat James Traficant voted for Republican Dennis Hastert in 2001 (107th Congress). In response, the Democrats stripped him of his seniority, and he lost all of his committee posts.

Upon election, the new speaker is sworn in by the dean of the United States House of Representatives, the chamber's longest-serving member. Additionally, it is customary for the outgoing speaker, or the minority leader, to hand the speaker's gavel to the new speaker, as a mark of the peaceful transition of power.

=== Eligibility of non-members ===
While every speaker of the House has been a sitting House member, Article I, Section II, Clause 5, of the U.S. Constitution, concerning the choosing of a speaker, does not explicitly state House membership as a requirement. As noted by the Congressional Research Service, non-members have, on multiple occasions since 1997, received votes in speaker elections. In 1787, while the proposed Constitution was being considered, Pennsylvania Congress of the Confederation delegate Tench Coxe publicly wrote the following:

The house of representatives is not, as the Senate, to have a president chosen for them from without their body, but are to elect their speaker from their own number . . . .

Noting that the Vesting Clause of Article I, Section I states that "All legislative Powers herein granted shall be vested in a Congress of the United States, which shall consist of a Senate and House of Representatives", political scientist Diana Schaub has argued, "Legislative powers cannot be lodged in the hands of a non-legislative person. To do so would violate the fundamental purpose of Article [I] of the Constitution." Both Schaub and the CRS note that the Standing Rules and Orders of the House created by the 1st United States Congress provided that the Speaker would vote "In all cases of ballot by the [H]ouse", while former House Intelligence Committee general counsel Michael Ellis and attorney Greg Dubinsky have argued that the speaker must be a House member because the Speaker performs various legislative functions that other House officers (such as the Sergeant at Arms and the Clerk) do not perform.

Schaub and the CRS also note that the text of the Presidential Succession Act of 1947 assumes that the speaker is a House member in requiring the speaker's resignation upon succession to the presidency due to the Ineligibility Clause of Article I, Section VI. The Ineligibility Clause provides that "No ... Representative shall, during the Time for which he was elected, be appointed to any civil Office under the Authority of the United States... and no Person holding any Office under the United States, shall be a Member of [the] House during his Continuance in Office." Along with political scientist Matthew J. Franck, Schaub, Ellis, and Dubinsky argue that permitting a Senator or an executive or judicial officer of the federal government to serve as a non-member Speaker would cause a significant breach of the constitutional separation of powers.

Schaub, Ellis, and Dubinsky also argue that permitting a non-member to serve as Speaker would effectively exempt Speakers from the eligibility requirements of the House Qualifications Clause of Article I, Section II and from being bound by an oath of office under the Oath or Affirmation Clause of Article VI as opposed to House members. The House Qualifications Clause requires that "No person shall be a Representative who shall not have attained to the Age of twenty-five Years, and been seven Years a Citizen of the United States". The Oath or Affirmation Clause provides that "The ... Representatives before mentioned... and all executive and judicial Officers ... of the United States... shall be bound by Oath or Affirmation, to support this Constitution". Pursuant to Article VI, the 1st United States Congress passed the Oath Administration Act (that remains in effect) which provides that "...the oath or affirmation [required by the sixth article of the Constitution of the United States]... shall be administered ... to the Speaker".

Like the U.S. Supreme Court's ruling in NLRB v. Noel Canning (2014), Ellis and Dubinsky cite an 1819 letter written by James Madison to Virginia Supreme Court of Appeals Judge Spencer Roane where Madison stated that "difficulties and differences of opinion [arising] in expounding terms [and] phrases ... used [in the Constitution]... might require a regular course of practice to liquidate [and] settle the meaning of some of them." In holding in NLRB v. Noel Canning that the Recess Appointments Clause of Article II, Section II does not authorize the President to make appointments while the Senate is in pro forma sessions, the Supreme Court cited Marbury v. Madison (1803) and McCulloch v. Maryland (1819) in concluding that "The longstanding 'practice of the government' ... can inform [the] determination of 'what the law is'".

=== Speaker pro tempore ===
Under the Rules of the House, the speaker may designate a member to serve as speaker pro tempore, acting as the body's presiding officer in the speaker's absence. In most instances, the speaker pro tempore designation lasts for no more than three legislative days, although in the case of illness of the speaker, the speaker pro tempore may serve for ten legislative days if the appointment is approved by the House.

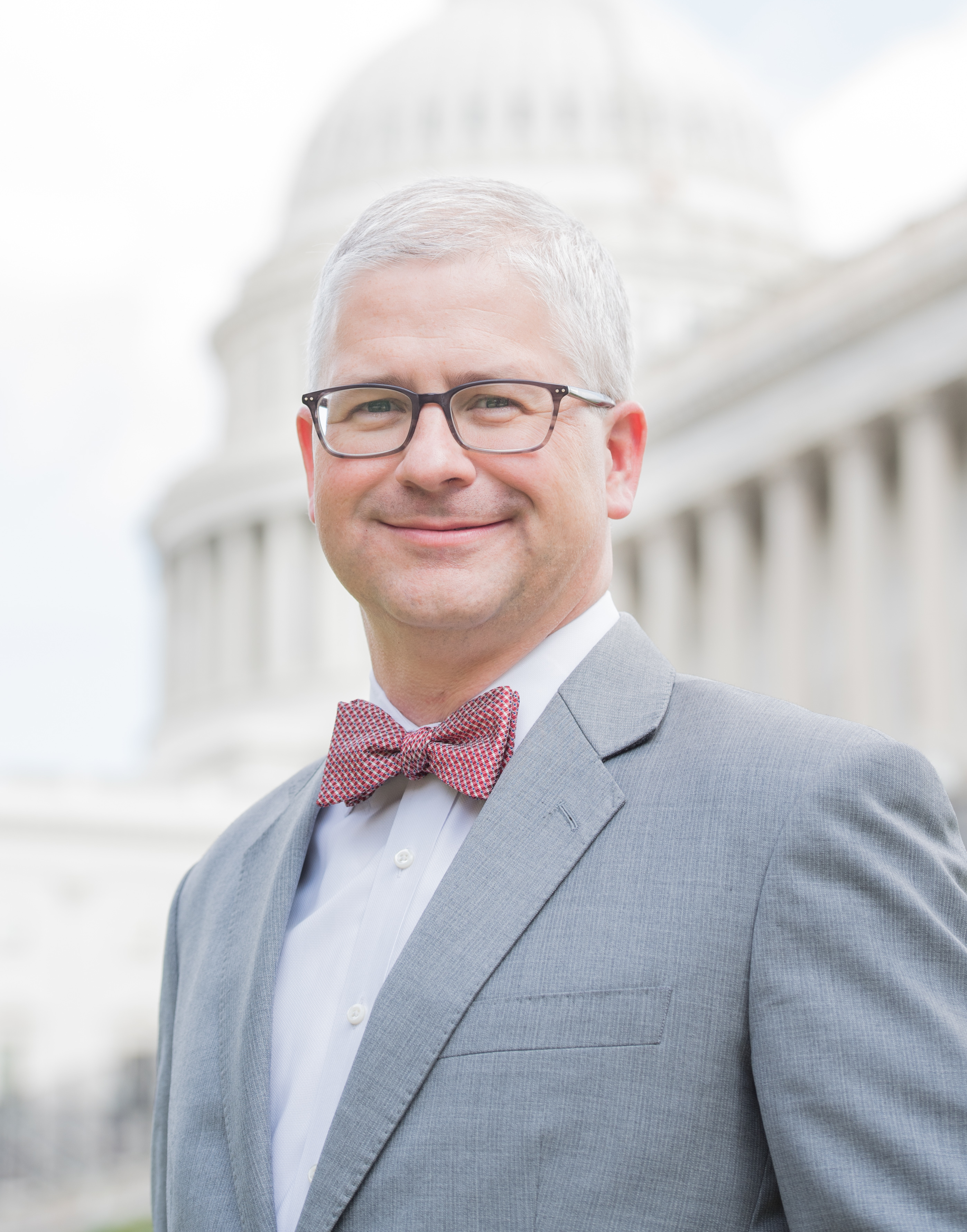
Patrick McHenry acted as speaker pro tempore in October 2023, following the removal of Kevin McCarthy.

Separately, a speaker pro tempore is designated in the event the office of the speaker is declared vacant. Under the current Rules of the House, at the start of their term, the speaker is required to create a secret ordered list of members to temporarily serve as speaker of the House if the speakership became vacant and to provide the clerk of the United States House of Representatives this list "as soon as practicable after" the election "and whenever appropriate thereafter." The names are only revealed in the event of a vacancy (e.g., by the speaker's death, resignation, incapacitation, or removal from office). This "succession list" procedure was created in 2003, following the September 11 attacks, to promote continuity of government. Rule I, clause 8, of the House Rules states the member whose name appears first on the list "shall act as Speaker pro tempore until the election of a Speaker or a Speaker pro tempore." The speaker pro tempore is not in the line of succession for the presidency.

Following the removal of Kevin McCarthy as speaker in October 2023 on a motion to vacate (the first time in history that a speaker of the U.S. House of Representatives was successfully removed by the House), Patrick McHenry was revealed to be the first name on McCarthy's list and became acting speaker. The intent of the rule was for the speaker pro tempore to serve for a short period, until the House elected a new speaker, but the House rules set no specific limit on the length of time that a member may be speaker pro tempore.

The designation of a speaker pro tempore for purposes of succession, and for purposes of serving as the body's presiding officer in the speaker's absence, is separate from the speaker's designation of multiple members as speakers pro tempore for the purpose of allowing them to sign enrolled bills and joint resolutions. The House Rules state: "With the approval of the House, the Speaker may appoint a Member to act as Speaker pro tempore only to sign enrolled bills and joint resolutions for a specified period of time." The list of the members with this duty (usually political allies of the speaker, or members from districts close to Washington and thus better able to hold pro forma sessions) is made public.

== History ==
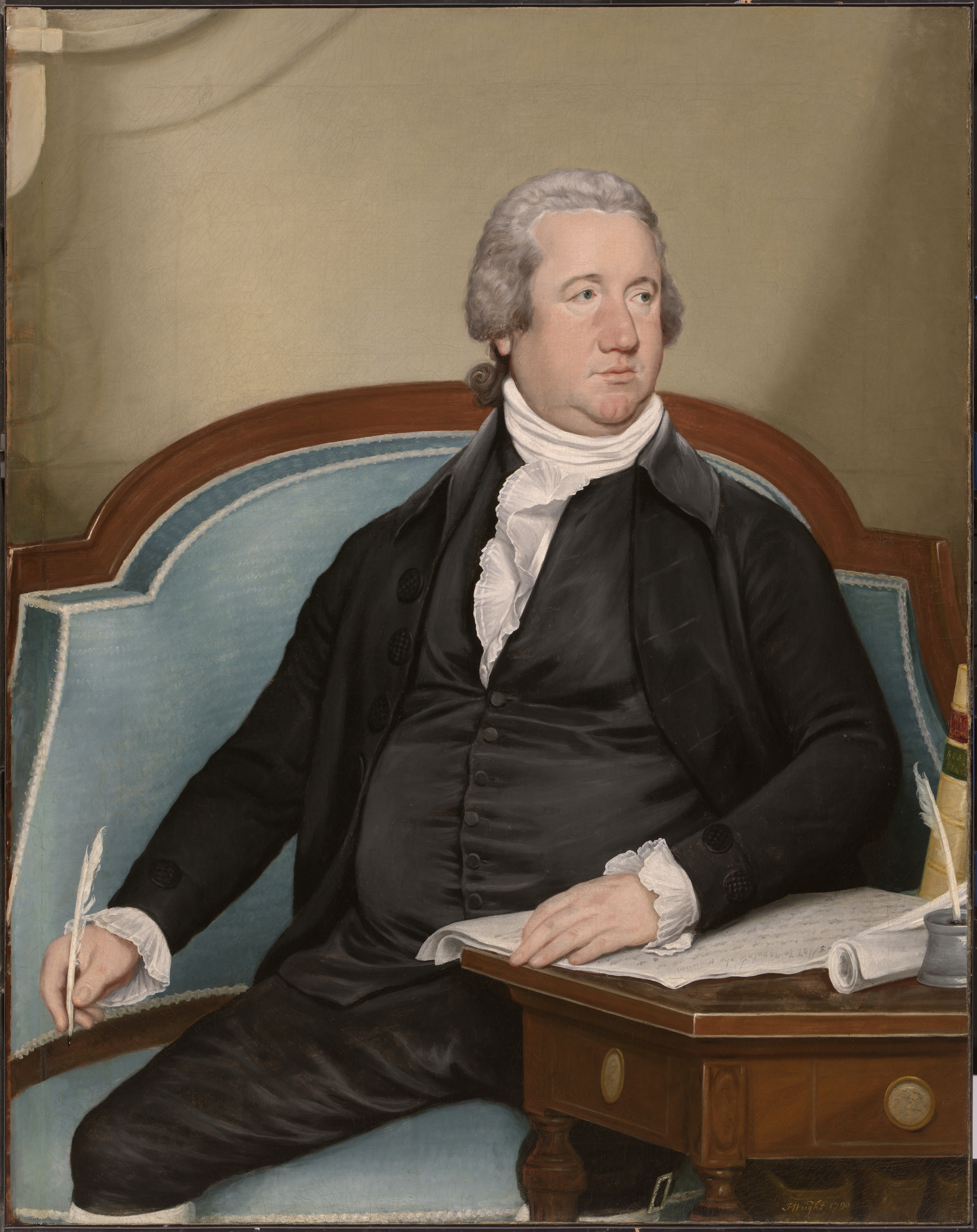
Frederick Muhlenberg (1789–1791, 1793–1795) was the first speaker.

The first speaker of the House, Frederick Muhlenberg of Pennsylvania, was elected to office on April 1, 1789, the day the House organized itself at the start of the 1st Congress. He served two non-consecutive terms in the speaker's chair, 1789–1791 (1st Congress) and 1793–1795 (3rd Congress).

As the Constitution does not state the duties of the speaker, the speaker's role has largely been shaped by rules and customs that evolved over time. Scholars are divided as to whether early speakers played largely ceremonial and impartial roles or whether they were more active partisan actors.

=== 19th century ===
From early in its existence, the speaker's primary function had been to keep order and enforce rules. The speakership was transformed into a position with power over the legislative process under Henry Clay (1811–1814, 1815–1820, and 1823–1825). In contrast to many of his predecessors, Clay participated in several debates and used his influence to procure the passage of measures he supported—for instance, the declaration of the War of 1812, and various laws relating to Clay's "American System" economic plan. Furthermore, when no candidate received an Electoral College majority in the 1824 presidential election, causing the president to be elected by the House, Speaker Clay threw his support to John Quincy Adams instead of Andrew Jackson, thereby ensuring Adams' victory. Following Clay's retirement in 1825, the power of the speakership once again began to decline, despite speakership elections becoming increasingly bitter. As the Civil War approached, several sectional factions nominated their own candidates, often making it difficult for any candidate to attain a majority. In 1855 and again in 1859, for example, the contest for speaker lasted for two months before the House achieved a result. Speakers tended to have very short tenures during this period. For example, from 1839 to 1863 there were eleven speakers, only one of whom served for more than one term. James K. Polk is the only speaker of the House who was later elected president of the United States.

Toward the end of the 19th century, the office of speaker began to develop into a very powerful one. At the time, one of the most important sources of the speaker's power was his position as Chairman of the Committee on Rules, which, after the reorganization of the committee system in 1880, became one of the most powerful standing committees of the House. Furthermore, several speakers became leading figures in their political parties; examples include Democrats Samuel J. Randall, John Griffin Carlisle, and Charles F. Crisp, and Republicans James G. Blaine, Thomas Brackett Reed, and Joseph Gurney Cannon.

The power of the speaker was greatly augmented during the tenure of the Republican Thomas Brackett Reed (1889–1891, 1895–1899). "Czar Reed", as he was called by his opponents, sought to end the obstruction of bills by the minority, in particular by countering the tactic known as the "disappearing quorum". By refusing to vote on a motion, the minority could ensure that a quorum would not be achieved and that the result would be invalid. Reed, however, declared that members who were in the chamber but refused to vote would still count for the purposes of determining a quorum. Through these and other rulings, Reed ensured that the Democrats could not block the Republican agenda.

=== 20th century ===
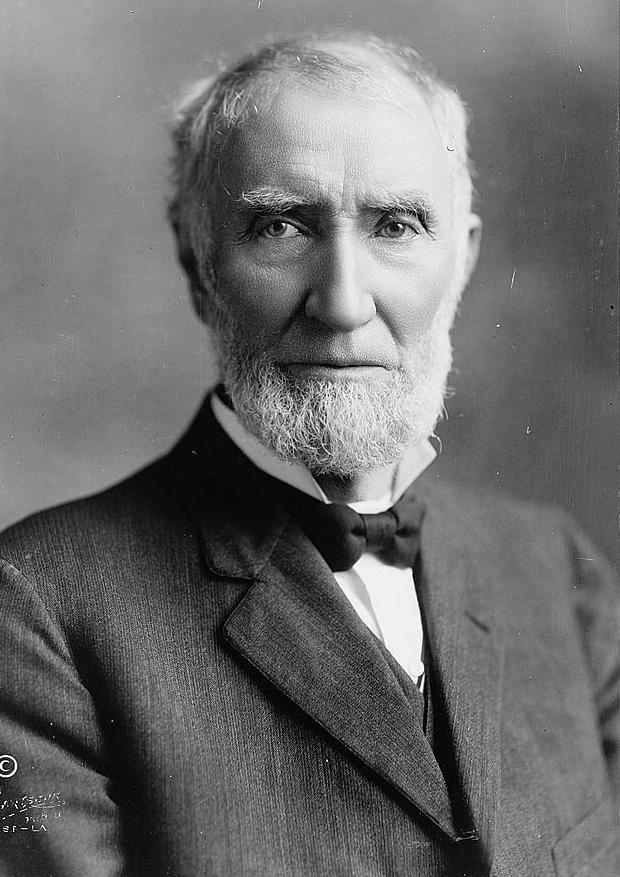
Joseph Gurney Cannon (1903–1911) is often considered the most powerful speaker.

The speakership reached its apogee during the term of Republican Joseph Gurney Cannon (1903–1911). Cannon exercised extraordinary control over the legislative process. He determined the agenda of the House, appointed the members of all committees, chose committee chairmen, headed the Rules Committee, and determined which committee heard each bill. He vigorously used his powers to ensure that Republican proposals were passed by the House. In 1910, however, Democrats and several dissatisfied Republicans joined to strip Cannon of many of his powers, including the ability to name committee members and his chairmanship of the Rules Committee. Fifteen years later, Speaker Nicholas Longworth restored much, but not all, of the lost influence of the position.

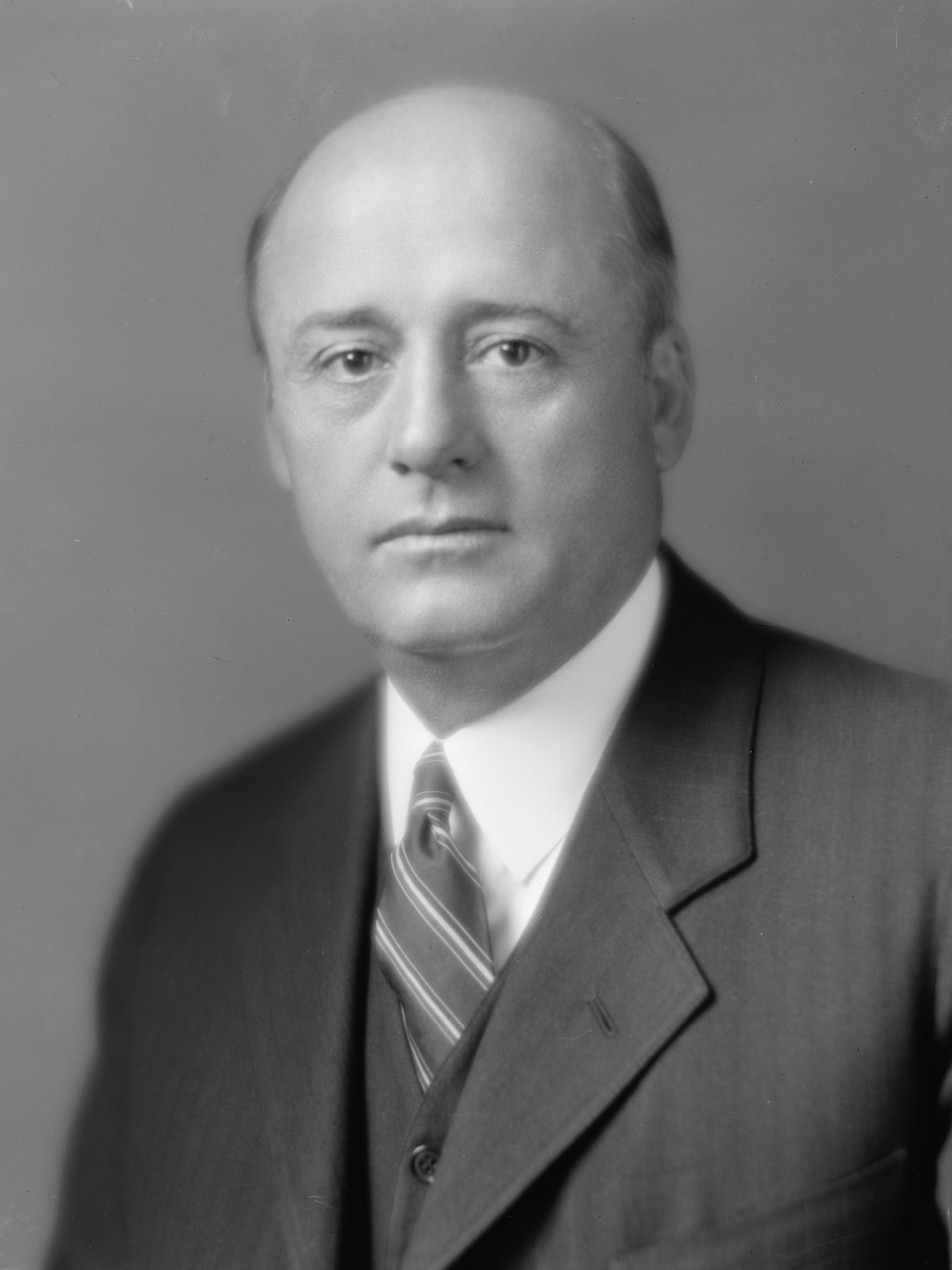
Sam Rayburn (1940–1947; 1949–1953; and 1955–1961) was the longest serving speaker.

One of the most influential speakers in history was Democrat Sam Rayburn. Rayburn had the most cumulative time as speaker in history, holding office from 1940 to 1947, 1949 to 1953, and 1955 to 1961. He helped shape many bills, working quietly in the background with House committees. He also helped ensure the passage of several domestic measures and foreign assistance programs advocated by Presidents Franklin D. Roosevelt and Harry Truman.

Rayburn's successor, Democrat John W. McCormack (served 1962–1971), was a somewhat less influential speaker, particularly because of dissent from younger members of the Democratic Party. During the mid-1970s, the power of the speakership once again grew under Democrat Carl Albert. The Committee on Rules ceased to be a semi-independent panel, as it had been since 1910. Instead, it once again became an arm of the party leadership. Moreover, in 1975, the speaker was granted the authority to appoint a majority of the members of the Rules Committee. Meanwhile, the power of committee chairmen was curtailed, further increasing the relative influence of the speaker.

Albert's successor, Democrat Tip O'Neill, was a prominent speaker because of his public opposition to the policies of President Ronald Reagan. O'Neill is the longest continuously serving speaker, from 1977 through 1987. He challenged Reagan on domestic programs and on defense expenditures. Republicans made O'Neill the target of their election campaigns in 1980 and 1982 but Democrats managed to retain their majorities in both years.

The roles of the parties reversed in 1994 when, after spending forty years in the minority, the Republicans regained control of the House with the "Contract with America", an idea spearheaded by Minority Whip Newt Gingrich.

Speaker Gingrich would regularly clash with Democratic President Bill Clinton, leading to the United States federal government shutdown of 1995 and 1996, in which Clinton was largely seen to have prevailed. Gingrich's hold on the leadership was weakened significantly by that and several other controversies, and he faced a caucus revolt in 1997.

After the Republicans lost House seats in 1998 (although retaining a majority) he did not stand for a third term as speaker. His successor, Dennis Hastert, had been chosen as a compromise candidate since the other Republicans in the leadership were more controversial.

Hastert, who had been serving in the House since 1987, became the longest serving Republican speaker (1999-2007). Hastert led the campaign to elect Tom DeLay, with whom he developed a close and effective partnership, as House Majority Whip.

=== 21st century ===
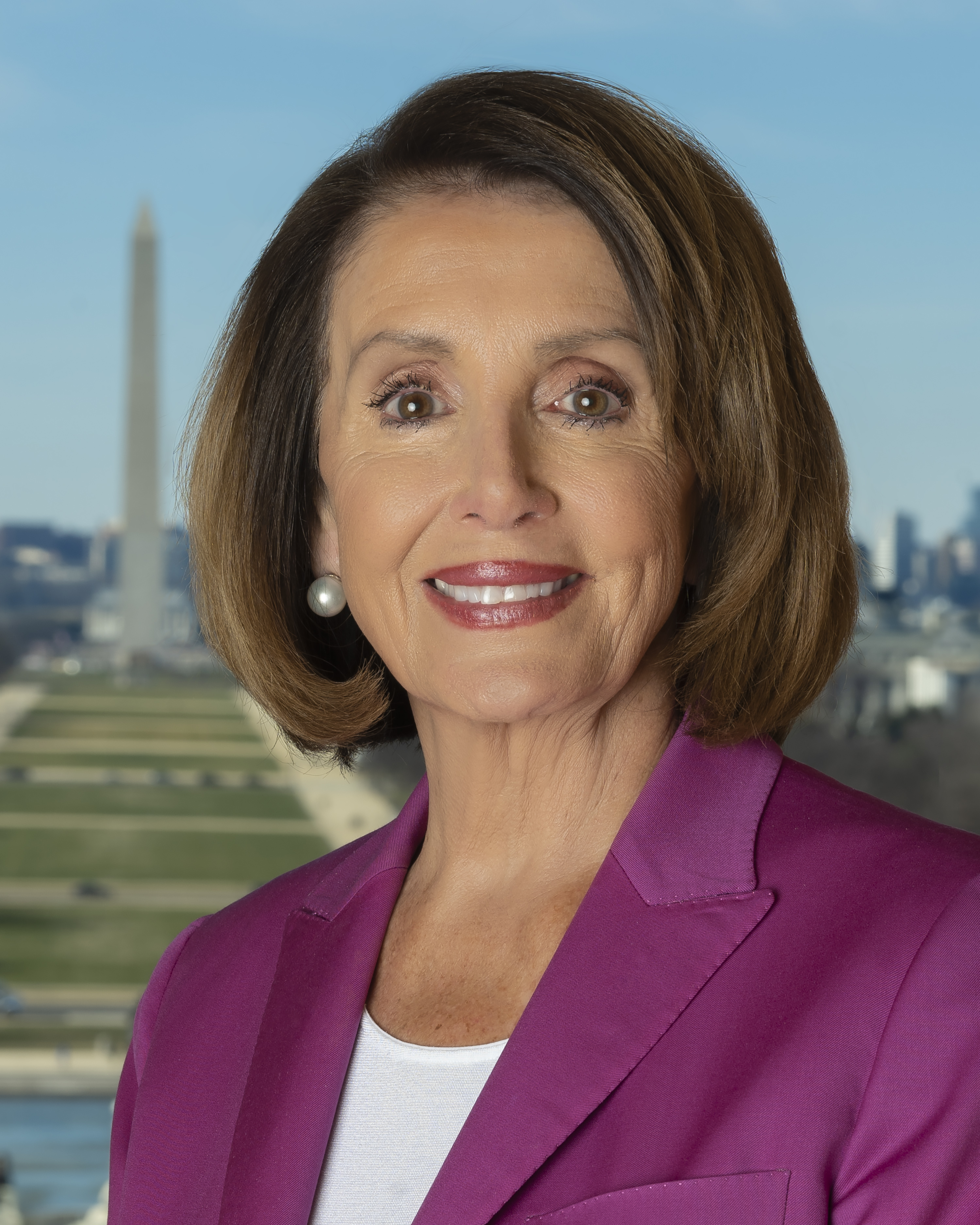
Nancy Pelosi (2007–2011; 2019–2023) was the first woman to serve as speaker)

The Republicans came out of the 2000 elections with a further reduced majority but made small gains in 2002 and 2004. The periods of 2001–2002 and 2003–2007 were the first times since 1953–1955 that there was single-party Republican leadership in Washington, interrupted from 2001 to 2003 as Senator Jim Jeffords of Vermont left the Republican Party to become independent and caucused with Senate Democrats to give them a 51–49 majority.

In the 2006 midterm elections, the Democratic Party regained control of the House of Representatives. Nancy Pelosi was elected Speaker of the House, becoming the first woman to hold the position.

John Boehner was elected speaker when the 112th Congress convened on January 5, 2011, and was re-elected twice, at the start of the 113th and 114th Congresses. On both of those occasions his remaining in office was threatened by the defection of several members from his own party who chose not to vote for him. Boehner's tenure as speaker, which ended when he resigned from Congress in October 2015, was marked by multiple battles with the conservatives in his own party related to "Obamacare", appropriations, among other political issues. This intra-party discord continued under Boehner's successor, Paul Ryan.

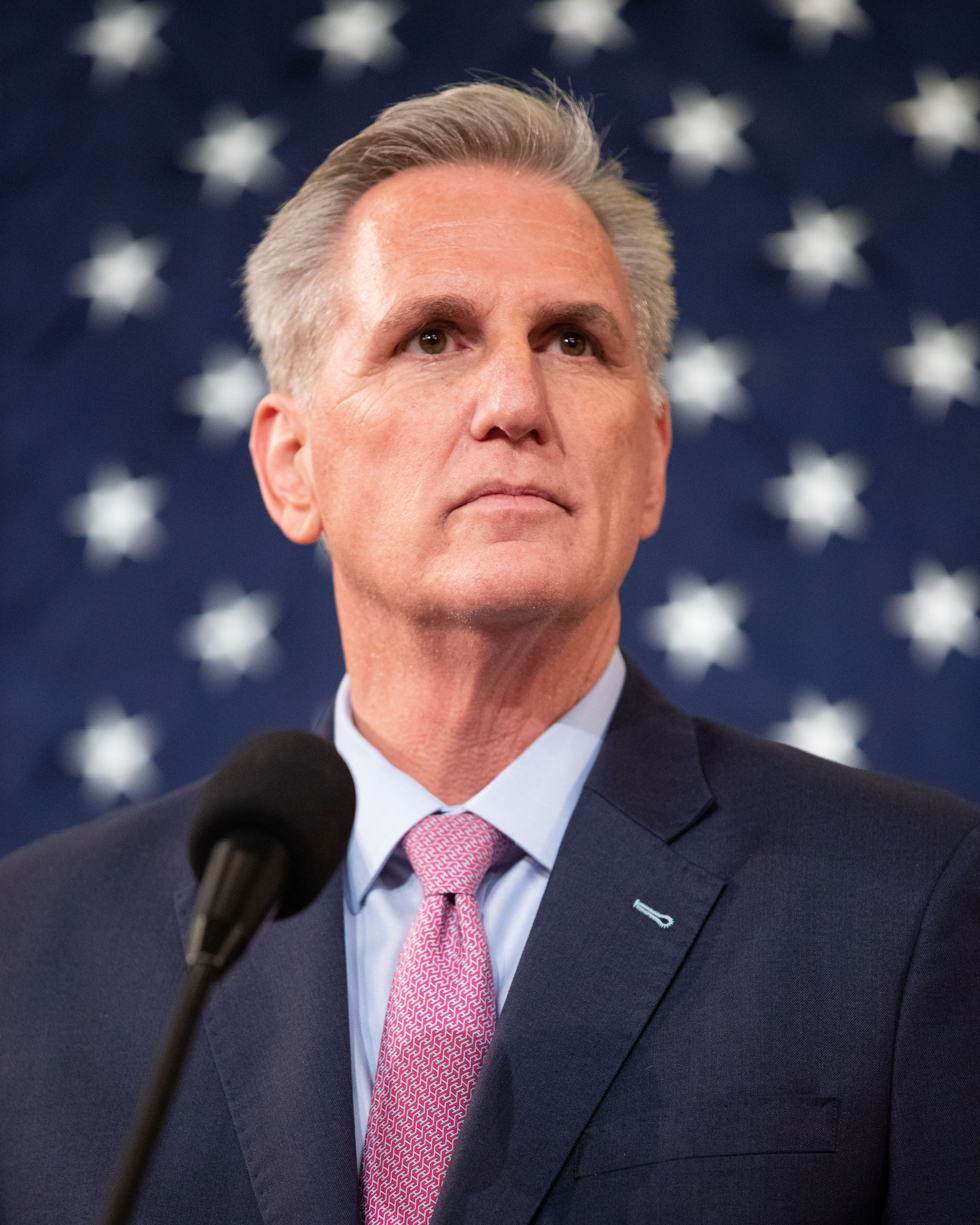
Kevin McCarthy (2023) was the first speaker to be removed from office

When Boehner succeeded Pelosi as speaker in 2011, Pelosi remained the leader of the Democratic Party in the House of Representatives and served as House minority leader for eight years before she led her party to victory in the 2018 elections. Following the 2018 midterm elections which saw the election of a Democratic Party majority in the House, Nancy Pelosi was again elected speaker when the 116th Congress convened on January 3, 2019. In addition to being the first woman to hold the office, Pelosi became the first speaker to return to power since Sam Rayburn in the 1950s. Following the 2022 midterm elections which saw the election of a narrow Republican Party majority in the House, Pelosi did not seek a Democratic leadership post in the next Congress. The Democratic Caucus named her "Speaker Emerita".

Kevin McCarthy then became the new Speaker of the House on January 7, 2023, after the longest multi-ballot speaker election since 1859. McCarthy was eventually removed as speaker on October 3, 2023, after a further split in the Republican caucus, with five House Freedom Caucus members voting against McCarthy, which when combined with votes of Democrats, resulted in the ouster of McCarthy. This was the first time in the history of the House of Representatives in which the Speaker of the House was successfully removed. Following a multi-day four-ballot election, Mike Johnson was elected speaker on October 25, 2023.

== Elections ==
Historically, there have been several controversial elections to the speakership, such as the contest of 1839. In that case, even though the 26th United States Congress convened on December 2, the House could not begin the speakership election until December 14 because of an election dispute in New Jersey known as the "Broad Seal War". Two rival delegations, one Whig and the other Democrat, had been certified as elected by different branches of the New Jersey government. The problem was compounded by the fact that the result of the dispute would determine whether the Whigs or the Democrats held the majority. Neither party agreed to permit a speakership election with the opposite party's delegation participating. Finally, it was agreed to exclude both delegations from the election and a speaker was finally chosen on December 17.

Another, more prolonged fight occurred in 1855 in the 34th United States Congress. The old Whig Party had collapsed but no single party had emerged to replace it. Candidates opposing the Democrats had run under a bewildering variety of labels, including Whig, Republican, American (Know Nothing), and simply "Opposition". By the time Congress actually met in December 1855, most of the northerners were concentrated together as Republicans, while most of the southerners and a few northerners used the American or Know Nothing label. Opponents of the Democrats held a majority in House, with the party makeup of the 234 representatives being 83 Democrats, 108 Republicans, and 43 Know Nothings (primarily southern oppositionists). The Democratic minority nominated William Alexander Richardson of Illinois as speaker, but because of sectional distrust, the various oppositionists were unable to agree on a single candidate for speaker. The Republicans supported Nathaniel Prentice Banks of Massachusetts, who had been elected as a Know Nothing but was now largely identified with the Republicans. The southern Know Nothings supported first Humphrey Marshall of Kentucky, and then Henry M. Fuller of Pennsylvania. The voting went on for almost two months with no candidate able to secure a majority, until it was finally agreed to elect the speaker by plurality vote, and Banks was elected.

The House found itself in a similar dilemma when the 36th Congress met in December 1859. Although the Republicans held a plurality, the Republican candidate, John Sherman, was unacceptable to southern oppositionists due to his anti-slavery views, and once again the House was unable to elect a speaker. After Democrats allied with southern oppositionists to nearly elect the North Carolina oppositionist William N. H. Smith, Sherman finally withdrew in favor of compromise candidate William Pennington of New Jersey, a former Whig of unclear partisan loyalties, who was finally elected speaker on February 1, 1860.

In December 1923, at the start of the 68th Congress, Republican Frederick H. Gillett needed nine ballots to win reelection. Progressive Republicans had refused to support Gillett in the first eight ballots. Only after winning concessions from Republican conference leaders (a seat on the House Rules Committee and a pledge that requested House rules changes would be considered) did they agree to support him.

In 1997, several Republican congressional leaders tried to force Speaker Newt Gingrich to resign. However, Gingrich refused since that would have required a new election for speaker, which could have led to Democrats along with dissenting Republicans voting for Democrat Dick Gephardt (then minority leader) as speaker. After the 1998 midterm elections where the Republicans lost seats, Gingrich did not stand for re-election. The next two figures in the House Republican leadership hierarchy, Majority Leader Richard Armey and Majority Whip Tom DeLay chose not to run for the office. The chairman of the House Appropriations Committee, Bob Livingston, declared his bid for the speakership, which was unopposed, making him speaker-designate. It was then revealed, by Livingston himself, who had been publicly critical of President Bill Clinton's alleged perjury during his sexual harassment trial, that he had engaged in an extramarital affair. He opted to resign from the House, despite being urged to stay on by House Democratic leader Gephardt. Subsequently, the chief deputy whip Dennis Hastert was selected as speaker. The Republicans retained their majorities in the 2000, 2002, and 2004 elections.

The Democrats won a majority of seats in the 2006 midterm elections. On November 16, 2006, Nancy Pelosi, who was then minority leader, was selected as speaker-designate by House Democrats. When the 110th Congress convened on January 4, 2007, she was elected as the 52nd speaker by a vote of 233–202, becoming the first woman elected speaker of the House. Pelosi was reelected speaker in the 111th Congress, and again in the 116th and 117th Congresses.

The January 2023 speakership election occurred two months after the 2022 House elections in which the Republicans won a slim four-seat majority. Kevin McCarthy was nominated for speaker by the House Republican Conference but due to a division among the Republicans, no one received a majority of the votes on the first ballot, necessitating an additional round of balloting for the first time since 1923. McCarthy ultimately prevailed when the remaining six anti-McCarthy holdouts voted "present" on the 15th ballot, ending the longest multiple-ballot speaker election since before the Civil War. He was removed from office less than ten months later, the first time in American history the House voted to remove its incumbent speaker. This led to multiple rounds of voting across multiple weeks to replace him, ultimately leading to the election of Representative Mike Johnson. This came after two weeks of negotiations between Republicans, including three failed votes for Speaker.

=== Multi-ballot elections ===
In total, there have been 16 elections requiring multiple ballots to elect a speaker, with 13 before the American Civil War, one in 1923, and two in 2023.

Congress	Person elected	Party	District	# Ballots	Election date(s)
3rd	Frederick Muhlenberg	Anti-Administration	PA at-large	3	December 2, 1793
6th	Theodore Sedgwick	Federalist	MA 1	2	December 2, 1799
9th	Nathaniel Macon	Democratic-Republican	NC 6	3	December 2, 1805
11th	Joseph Bradley Varnum	Democratic-Republican	MA 4	2	May 22, 1809
16th	John W. Taylor	Democratic-Republican	NY 11	22	November 13–15, 1820
17th	Philip P. Barbour	Democratic-Republican	VA 11	12	December 3–4, 1821
19th	John W. Taylor	National Republican	NY 17	2	December 5, 1825
23rd	John Bell	Jacksonian	TN 9	10	June 2, 1834
26th	Robert M. T. Hunter	Whig	VA 9	11	December 14–16, 1839
30th	Robert Charles Winthrop	Whig	MA 1	3	December 6, 1847
31st	Howell Cobb	Democratic	GA 6	63	December 3–22, 1849
34th	Nathaniel P. Banks	American	MA 7	133	December 3, 1855 – February 2, 1856
36th	William Pennington	Republican	NJ 5	44	December 5, 1859 – February 1, 1860
68th	Frederick H. Gillett	Republican	MA 2	9	December 3–5, 1923
118th	Kevin McCarthy	Republican	CA 20	15	January 3–7, 2023
118th	Mike Johnson	Republican	LA 4	4	October 17–25, 2023

== Partisan role ==
The Constitution does not spell out the political role of the speaker. As the office has developed historically, however, it has taken on a clearly partisan cast, very different from the speakership of most Westminster-style legislatures, such as the speaker of the United Kingdom's House of Commons, which is meant to be scrupulously non-partisan. The speaker in the United States, by tradition, is the head of the majority party in the House of Representatives, outranking the majority leader. However, despite having the right to vote, the speaker usually does not participate in debate and only votes on the most significant bills.

The speaker is responsible for ensuring that the House passes legislation supported by the majority party. In pursuing this goal, the speaker may use their influence over the Rules committee, which is in charge of the business of the House. The speaker chairs the majority party's House steering committee, which selects the majority members of each House standing committee, including the Rules committee (although it's worth to note their appointment to the said committees must be ratified by a resolution of the full House). While the speaker is the functioning head of the House majority party, the same is not true of the president pro tempore of the Senate, whose office is primarily ceremonial and honorary.

When the speaker and the president belong to the same party, the speaker tends to play the role in a more ceremonial light, as seen when Dennis Hastert played a very restrained role during the presidency of fellow Republican George W. Bush. Nevertheless, when the speaker and the president belong to the same party, there are also times that the speaker plays a much larger role, and the speaker is tasked, e.g., with pushing through the agenda of the majority party, often at the expense of the minority opposition. This can be seen, most of all, in the speakership of Democratic-Republican Henry Clay, who personally ensured the presidential victory of fellow Democratic-Republican John Quincy Adams. Democrat Sam Rayburn was a key player in the passing of New Deal legislation under the presidency of fellow Democrat Franklin Delano Roosevelt. Republican Joseph Gurney Cannon (under Theodore Roosevelt) was particularly infamous for his marginalization of the minority Democrats and centralizing of authority to the speakership. In more recent times, Speaker Nancy Pelosi played a role in continuing the push for health care reform during the presidency of fellow Democrat Barack Obama and in pushing for increases in infrastructure and climate spending during the presidency of Democrat Joe Biden.

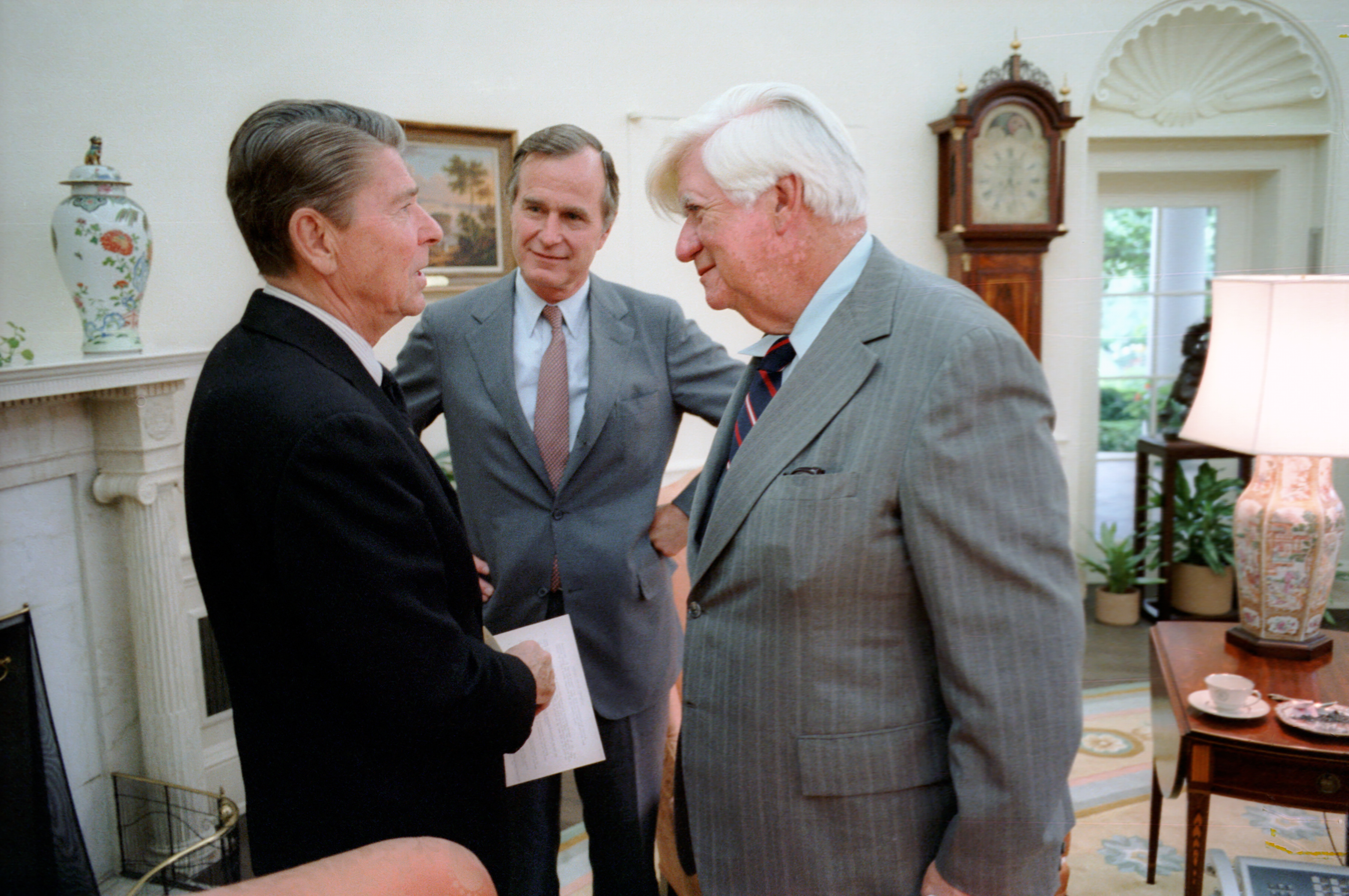
Speaker Tip O'Neill meeting with President Ronald Reagan and Vice President George H. W. Bush on June 1, 1981.

On the other hand, when the speaker and the president belong to opposite parties, the public role and influence of the speaker tend to increase. As the highest-ranking member of the opposition party (and de facto leader of the opposition), the speaker is normally the chief public opponent of the president's agenda. In this scenario, the speaker is known for undercutting the president's agenda by blocking measures by the minority party or rejecting bills by the Senate. One famous instance came in the form of Thomas Brackett Reed (under Grover Cleveland), a speaker notorious for his successful attempt to force the Democrats to vote on measures where the Republicans had clear majorities, which ensured that Cleveland's Democrats were in no position to challenge the Republicans in the House. Joseph Cannon was particularly unique in that he led the conservative "Old Guard" wing of the Republican Party, while his president—Theodore Roosevelt—was of the more progressive clique, and more than just marginalizing the Democrats, Cannon used his power to punish the dissidents in his party and obstruct the progressive wing of the Republican Party.

More modern examples include Tip O'Neill, who was a vocal opponent of President Ronald Reagan's economic and defense policies; Newt Gingrich, who fought a bitter battle with President Bill Clinton for control of domestic policy; Nancy Pelosi, who argued with President George W. Bush over the Iraq War; John Boehner, who clashed with President Barack Obama over budget issues and health care; and once again, Nancy Pelosi, who refused to support President Donald Trump over funding for a border wall.

== Presiding officer ==
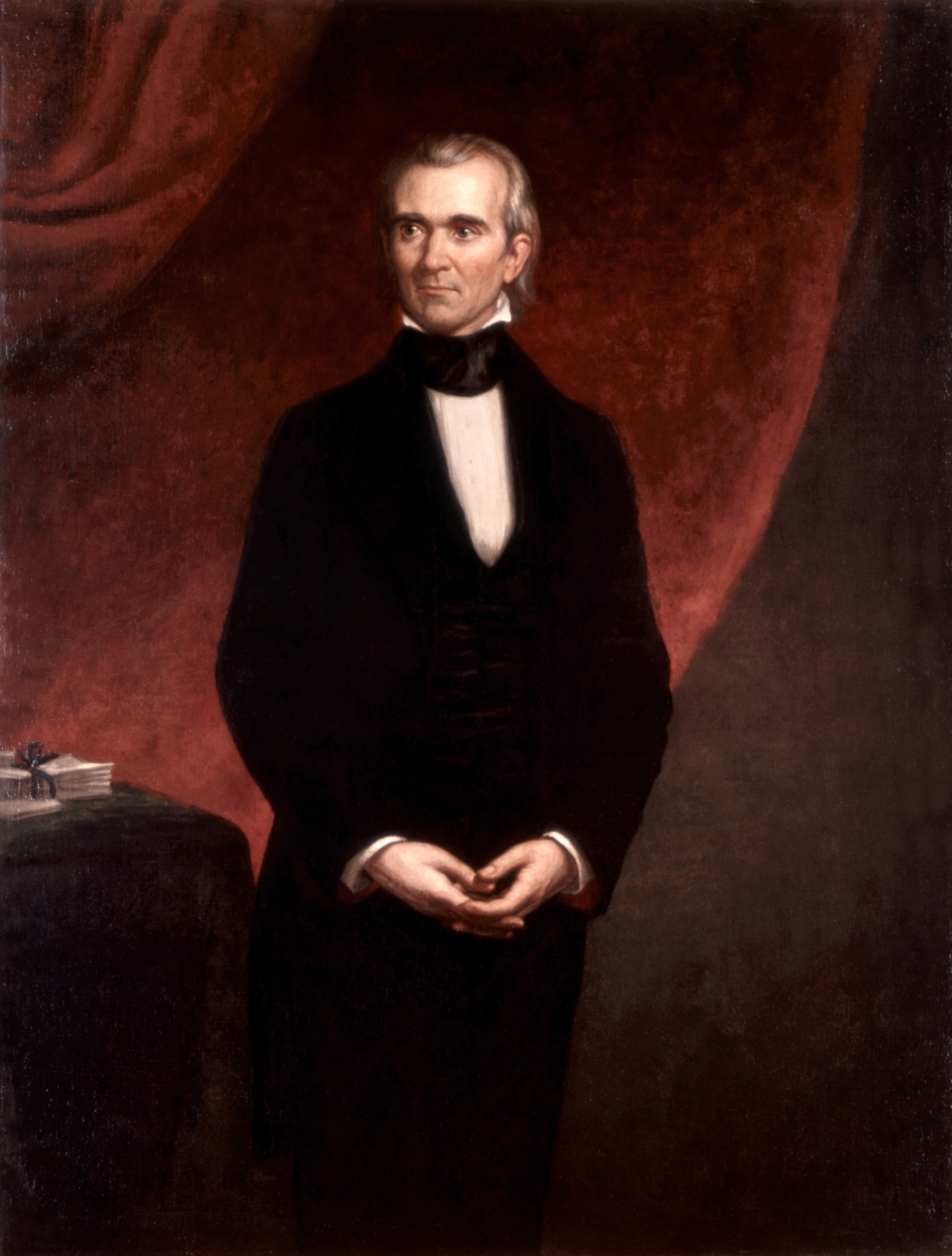
James Polk is the only Speaker (1835–1839) to have also served as President of the United States (1845–1849).

As presiding officer of the House of Representatives, the speaker holds a variety of powers over the House and is ceremonially the highest-ranking legislative official in the U.S. government. The speaker may delegate their powers to a member of the House to act as speaker pro tempore and to preside over the House in the speaker's absence; when this has occurred the delegation has always been to a member of the same party. During important debates, the speaker pro tempore is ordinarily a senior member of the majority party who may be chosen for his or her skill in presiding. At other times, more junior members may be assigned to preside to give them experience with the rules and procedures of the House. The speaker may also designate, with approval of the House, a speaker pro tempore for special purposes, such as designating a representative whose district is near Washington, D.C. to sign enrolled bills during long recesses.

Under the rules of the House, the speaker, "as soon as practicable after the election of the speaker and whenever appropriate thereafter", must deliver to the clerk of the House a list of members who are designated to act as speaker in the case of a vacancy or physical inability of the speaker to perform their duties.

On the floor of the House, the presiding officer is always addressed as "Mister Speaker" or "Madam Speaker", even if that person is serving as speaker pro tempore. When the House resolves itself into a Committee of the Whole, the speaker designates a member to preside over the committee, who is addressed as "Mister Chairman" or "Madam Chairwoman". To speak, members must seek the presiding officer's recognition. The presiding officer also rules on all points of order but such rulings may be appealed to the whole House. The speaker is responsible for maintaining decorum in the House and may order the Sergeant-at-Arms to enforce House rules.

The speaker is in charge of deciding which committee a bill will be assigned to, of determining whether to allow a member to make a motion to suspend the rules and of appointing members to select committees and conference committees.

As a member of the House, the speaker is entitled to participate in debate and to vote. Ordinarily, the speaker votes only when the speaker's vote would be decisive or on matters of great importance, such as constitutional amendments or major legislation. Under the early rules of the House, the speaker was generally barred from voting, but today the speaker has the same right as other members to vote but only occasionally exercises it. The speaker may vote on any matter that comes before the House, and they are required to vote where their vote would be decisive or where the House is engaged in voting by ballot.

== Other functions ==
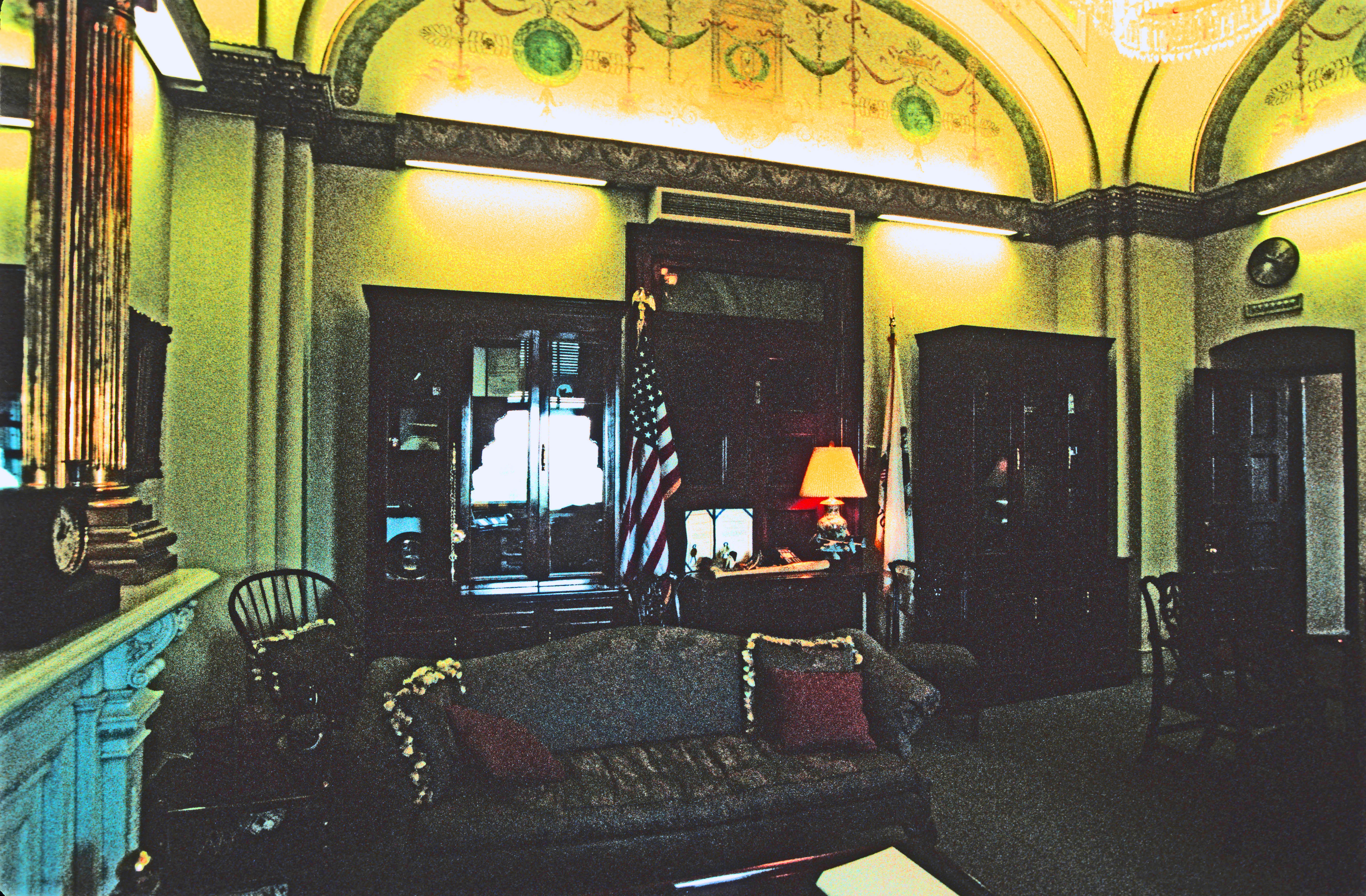
Speaker's office in the U.S. Capitol, during the term of Dennis Hastert (1999–2007)

In addition to being the political and parliamentary leader of the House of Representatives and representing their congressional district, the speaker also performs various other administrative and procedural functions, such as:

- Oversees the officers of the House: the clerk, the sergeant-at-arms, the chief administrative officer, and the chaplain;
- Serves as the chairperson of the House Office Building Commission;
- Appoints the House's parliamentarian, historian, general counsel, and inspector general;
- Administers the House audio and video broadcasting system;
- In consultation with the minority leader, can devise a system of drug testing in the House. This option has never been exercised;
- Receives reports or other communications from the president, government agencies, boards, and commissions; and
- Receives, along with the president pro tempore of the Senate, written declarations that a U.S. president is unable to discharge the powers and duties of his office, or is able to resume them, under Sections 3 and 4 of the Twenty-fifth Amendment.

Additionally, the speaker is second in the presidential line of succession under the Presidential Succession Act of 1947, immediately after the vice president and before the president pro tempore of the Senate (who is followed by members of the president's Cabinet). Thus, if both the presidency and vice-presidency were vacant simultaneously, then the speaker would become acting president, after resigning from the House and as speaker.

Ratification of the Twenty-fifth Amendment in 1967, with its mechanism for filling an intra-term vice-presidential vacancy, has made calling on the speaker, president pro tempore, or a cabinet member to serve as acting president unlikely to happen, except in the aftermath of a catastrophic event. However, only a few years after it went into effect, in 1973, at the height of Watergate, Vice President Spiro Agnew resigned. With Agnew's unexpected departure and the state of Richard Nixon's presidency, Speaker Carl Albert was suddenly first in line to become acting president. The vacancy continued until Gerald Ford was sworn in as vice president. Albert was also next in line from the time Ford assumed the presidency following Nixon's resignation from office in 1974, until Ford's choice to succeed him as vice president, Nelson Rockefeller, was confirmed by Congress.

== See also ==
- Party leaders of the United States House of Representatives
- Party leaders of the United States Senate

== Bibliography ==
- Garraty, John, ed. American National Biography (1999) 20 volumes; contains scholarly biographies of all speakers no longer alive.
- Green, Matthew N. The Speaker of the House: A Study of Leadership (Yale University Press; 2010) 292 pages; Examines partisan pressures and other factors that shaped the leadership of the speaker of the U.S. House of Representatives; focuses on the period since 1940.
- Grossman, Mark. Speakers of the House of Representatives (Amenia, NY: Grey House Publishing, 2009). The comprehensive work on the subject, covering, in depth, the lives of the speakers from Frederick Muhlenberg to Nancy Pelosi.
- Heitshusen, Valerie (November 26, 2018). "Speakers of the House: Elections, 1913–2017" (PDF). Congressional Research Service.
- Remini, Robert V. The House: the History of the House of Representatives (Smithsonian Books, 2006). The standard scholarly history.
- Rohde, David W. Parties and Leaders in the Postreform House (1991).
- Rossiter, Clinton, ed. (2003). The Federalist Papers. Signet Classics. ISBN 9780451528810.
- Smock, Raymond W., and Susan W. Hammond, eds. Masters of the House: Congressional Leadership Over Two Centuries (1998). Short biographies of key leaders.
- Zelizer. Julian E. ed. The American Congress: The Building of Democracy (2004). A comprehensive history by 40 scholars.

U.S. presidential line of succession
Preceded by Vice President; JD Vance	2nd in line	Succeeded by President pro tempore of the Senate; Chuck Grassley
