= National Register of Historic Places listings in Dearborn County, Indiana =

Location of Dearborn County in Indiana

This is a list of the National Register of Historic Places listings in Dearborn County, Indiana.

This is intended to be a complete list of the properties and districts on the National Register of Historic Places in Dearborn County, Indiana, United States. Latitude and longitude coordinates are provided for many National Register properties and districts; these locations may be seen together in a map.

There are 28 properties and districts listed on the National Register in the county, including one National Historic Landmark. There is also one former listing.

Properties and districts located in incorporated areas display the name of the municipality, while properties and districts in unincorporated areas display the name of their civil township. Properties and districts split between multiple jurisdictions display the names of all jurisdictions.

This National Park Service list is complete through NPS recent listings posted August 29, 2025.

== Current listings ==
	Name on the Register	Image	Date listed	Location	City or town	Description
1	Aurora City Hall	Aurora City Hall	March 14, 1996 (#96000288)	216 3rd St. and 233-237 Main St. 39°03′19″N 84°54′00″W	Aurora	
2	Aurora Methodist Episcopal Church	Aurora Methodist Episcopal Church	September 8, 1994 (#94001113)	304 3rd St. 39°03′20″N 84°54′03″W	Aurora	
3	Aurora Public Library	Aurora Public Library	May 27, 1993 (#93000474)	414 2nd St. 39°03′26″N 84°54′07″W	Aurora	Neo-Renaissance style building designed by Garber & Woodward in 1923
4	Carnegie Hall of Moores Hill College	Carnegie Hall of Moores Hill College	March 17, 1994 (#94000229)	14687 Main St. 39°06′44″N 85°05′33″W	Moores Hill	
5	Dearborn County Asylum for the Poor	Dearborn County Asylum for the Poor	September 22, 2000 (#00001143)	11636 County Farm Rd., northwest of Aurora; 39°09′02″N 85°02′03″W	Manchester Township	
6	Dearborn County Courthouse	Dearborn County Courthouse	April 9, 1981 (#81000008)	High and Mary Sts. 39°05′28″N 84°51′00″W	Lawrenceburg	
7	Downtown Aurora Historic District	Downtown Aurora Historic District	September 8, 1994 (#94001134)	Bounded by Importing, Water, Market, 5th, and Exporting Sts. 39°03′22″N 84°54′05″W	Aurora	
8	Downtown Lawrenceburg Historic District	Downtown Lawrenceburg Historic District	March 1, 1984 (#84001009)	Roughly bounded by the former Conrail railroad line and Charlotte, Tate, Williams, and Elm Sts. 39°05′36″N 84°50′55″W	Lawrenceburg	
9	First Evangelical United Church of Christ	First Evangelical United Church of Christ	September 23, 1994 (#94001104)	111 5th St. 39°03′11″N 84°53′56″W	Aurora	
10	First Presbyterian Church	First Presbyterian Church	September 8, 1994 (#94001116)	215 4th St. 39°03′15″N 84°54′02″W	Aurora	
11	George Street Bridge	George Street Bridge	March 1, 1984 (#84001012)	George, Main, and Importing Sts. 39°03′28″N 84°53′58″W	Aurora	
12	Greendale Historic District		December 3, 2019 (#100004720)	Roughly bounded by Gages Ln., Ridge Ave., Tanners Creek, Probasco St. & Nowlin Ave. 39°06′44″N 84°51′50″W	Greendale	
13	Hamline Chapel, United Methodist Church	Hamline Chapel, United Methodist Church	September 9, 1982 (#82000030)	High and Vine Sts. 39°05′30″N 84°50′54″W	Lawrenceburg	
14	Hillforest (Forest Hill)	Hillforest (Forest Hill)	August 5, 1971 (#71000005)	213 5th St. 39°03′12″N 84°54′04″W	Aurora	
15	Lewis Hurlbert, Sr. House	Lewis Hurlbert, Sr. House	November 25, 1994 (#94001350)	412 5th St. 39°03′16″N 84°54′13″W	Aurora	
16	Jennison Guard Site	Jennison Guard Site	May 12, 1975 (#75000014)	Between a rail line and the Ohio River, just west of the mouth of the Great Miami River and northeast of Lawrenceburg; 39°06′32″N 84°49′30″W	Lawrenceburg Township	
17	Laughery Creek Bridge	Laughery Creek Bridge	September 29, 1976 (#76000018)	South of Aurora west of State Road 56; 39°01′28″N 84°53′09″W	Center Township	Extends into Ohio County
18	Leive, Parks and Stapp Opera House	Leive, Parks and Stapp Opera House	September 20, 1994 (#94001120)	321-325 2nd St. 39°03′23″N 84°54′03″W	Aurora	
19	Daniel S. Major House	Daniel S. Major House	December 23, 2003 (#03001320)	761 W. Eads Parkway; 39°05′21″N 84°52′35″W	Lawrenceburg	
20	Moore's Hill United Methodist Church	Moore's Hill United Methodist Church	December 15, 1997 (#97001537)	13476 Main St. 39°06′47″N 85°05′16″W	Moores Hill	
21	River View Cemetery	River View Cemetery	December 31, 2013 (#13001011)	3635 E. Laughery Creek Rd., south of Aurora; 39°01′33″N 84°53′16″W	Center Township	
22	St. John's Lutheran Church and School	St. John's Lutheran Church and School	March 29, 1996 (#96000289)	7291 State Road 62, southwest of Dillsboro; 38°58′36″N 85°06′10″W	Caesar Creek Township	
23	Levi Stevens House	Levi Stevens House	May 30, 1996 (#96000599)	122 5th St. 39°03′12″N 84°53′58″W	Aurora	
24	State Line Archeological District	State Line Archeological District	July 24, 1975 (#75001423)	Straddling the Ohio/Indiana border, 2 miles (3.2 km) north of the Ohio River; 39°08′15″N 84°49′12″W	Greendale	Extends into Hamilton County, Ohio
25	Dr. George Sutton Medical Office Building	Dr. George Sutton Medical Office Building	September 8, 1994 (#94001118)	315 3rd St. 39°03′19″N 84°54′06″W	Aurora	
26	Vance-Tousey House	Vance-Tousey House	December 28, 2000 (#00001547)	508 W. High St. 39°05′20″N 84°51′07″W	Lawrenceburg	
27	Veraestau	Veraestau	April 11, 1973 (#73000013)	1 mile (1.6 km) south of Aurora on State Road 56; 39°02′33″N 84°53′44″W	Center Township	
28	Walker Hill Farm		September 2, 2025 (#100012174)	9939, 9925 and 9787 Hwy. 50; 39°01′48″N 85°00′14″W	Aurora	

== Former listings ==
	Name on the Register	Image	Date listed	Date removed	Location	City or town	Description
1	ELIZABETH LEA-JOSEPH THROCKMORTON (Towboat)		June 10, 2019 (#100004044)	December 7, 2023	11042 St. Rd. 56, Lighthouse Point Yacht Club; 39°01′51″N 84°52′45″W	Aurora vicinity	

== See also ==
- List of National Historic Landmarks in Indiana
- National Register of Historic Places listings in Indiana
- Listings in neighboring counties: Boone (KY), Butler (OH), Franklin, Hamilton (OH), Ohio, Ripley
- List of Indiana state historical markers in Dearborn County
