= Washington Township, Dearborn County, Indiana =

Washington Township
- Township
- Location of Washington Township in Dearborn County
- Coordinates: 39°01′40″N 84°58′03″W
- Country: United States
- State: Indiana
- County: Dearborn

Government
  - Type: Indiana township

Area
  - Total: 13.64 sq mi (35.3 km^{2})
  - Land: 13.57 sq mi (35.1 km^{2})
  - Water: 0.07 sq mi (0.18 km^{2})
- Elevation: 732 ft (223 m)

Population (2020)
  - Total: 1,434
  - Density: 105.4/sq mi (40.7/km^{2})
- FIPS code: 18-80540
- GNIS feature ID: 453991

Washington Township is one of fourteen townships in Dearborn County, Indiana. As of the 2010 census, its population was 1,431 and it contained 574 housing units.

== History ==
Washington Township was established in 1852.

== Geography ==
According to the 2010 census, the township has a total area of 13.64 square miles (35.3 km^{2}), of which 13.57 square miles (35.1 km^{2}) (or 99.49%) is land and 0.07 square miles (0.18 km^{2}) (or 0.51%) is water.

=== Major highways ===
- U.S. Route 50

=== Cemeteries ===
The township contains one cemetery, Mount Tabor Church.

== Education ==
Washington Township residents may obtain a library card at the Aurora Public Library in Aurora.
