= Thomas T. Gaff House =

Diplomatic residence in Washington, D.C.

Coordinates: 38.910952°N 77.045187°W

- U.S. Historic district – Contributing property
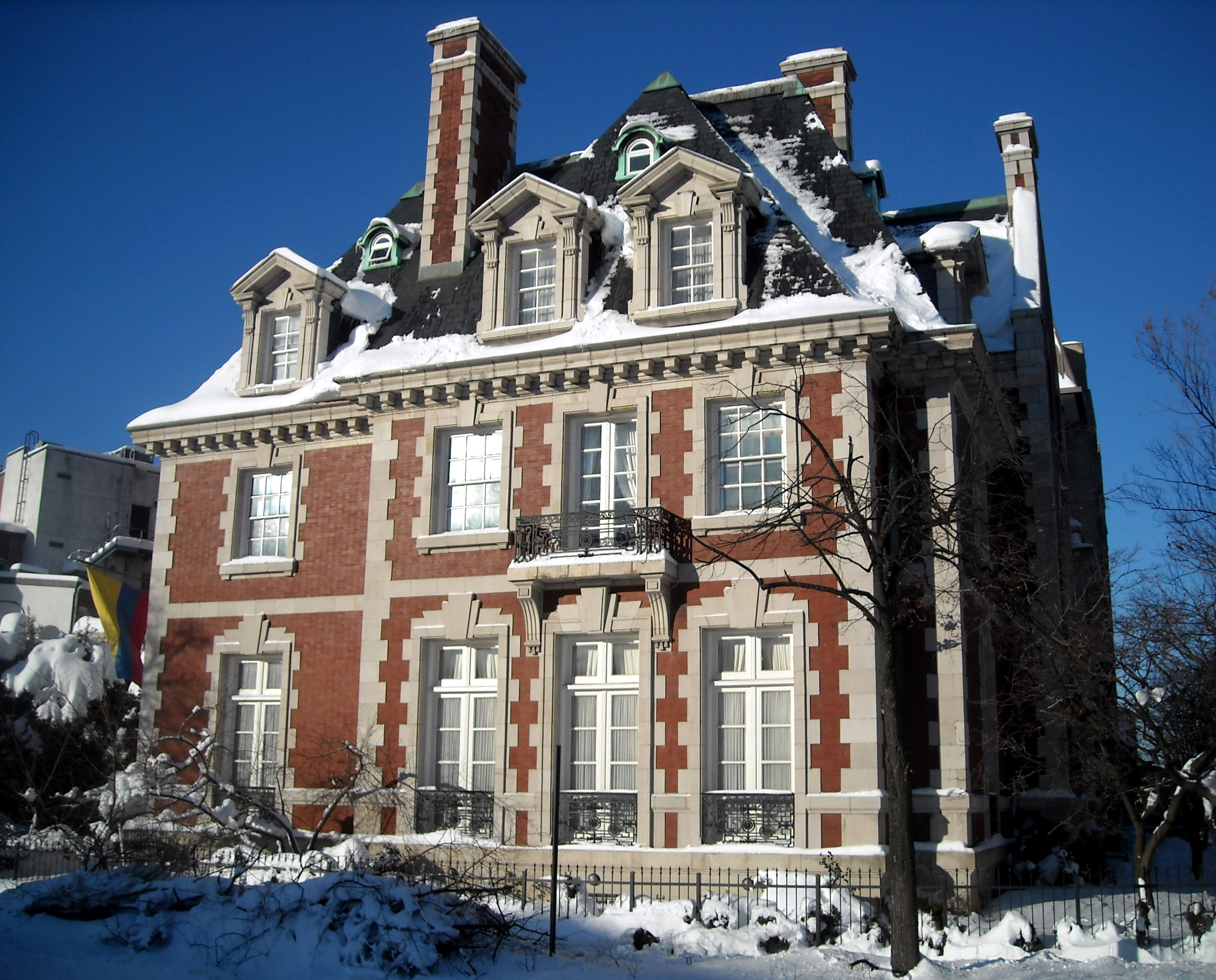
- Location: 1520 20th Street, NW Washington, D.C., US
- Built: 1905
- Architects: Bruce Price; Jules Henri de Sibour
- Architectural style: Châteauesque
- Part of: Dupont Circle Historic District (ID78003056)
- Designated CP: July 21, 1978

The Thomas T. Gaff House is the diplomatic residence of the Colombian ambassador to the United States, a post currently held by Ambassador Daniel García-Peña, and previously held by Luis Gilberto Murillo. The house, a contributing property to the Dupont Circle Historic District, is located at 1520 20th Street NW, Washington, D.C., across from the north entrance to the metro station in Dupont Circle and one block from Massachusetts Avenue's Embassy Row.

Its architecture was inspired by the Château Balleroy in Normandy, France, and features a hidden ballroom and a mix of 18th- and 19th-century interior designs.

The house has been home to a wealthy industrialist from Ohio, a United States senator, a member of the United States President's Cabinet, a Greek ambassador, and a former President of Colombia.

== History ==
Thomas T. Gaff was a wealthy businessman who made his fortune in the distillery and heavy machinery business in Cincinnati, Ohio. His childhood home, Hillforest, in Aurora, Indiana is a National Historic Landmark. After Gaff was appointed as a commissioner to the Panama Canal's construction by then-United States Secretary of War William Howard Taft, he and his wife Zaidee moved to Washington, D.C. The Gaffs chose New York City architect Bruce Price, working with the local architect and builder Jules Henri de Sibour to design their home at the corner of 20th and Q Streets NW. Jules Henri de Sibour was a prominent architect of large homes in Washington, D.C., including the Clarence Moore House, Andrew Mellon Building, and the ambassador residences of Portugal, France, and Luxembourg. Construction of the house lasted from 1904 to 1905.

The Gaff House was well known in Washington, D.C.'s high society; tea parties and other events were mentioned in The New York Times. From 1924 to 1925, the house was leased to Peter Goelet Gerry, a Senator from Rhode Island. After Gerry moved to a new home, the Gaff house was leased to Dwight F. Davis, President Calvin Coolidge's Secretary of War and founder of the Davis Cup. The government of Greece leased the house in 1929 for use as an embassy. In 1944, the Gaff house was sold to Colombia by Carey D. Langhorne, Thomas T. Gaff's daughter. The house has since been used as the official residence (the embassy) of the Colombian ambassador to the United States. The offices (the chancery) of the Embassy of Colombia to the United States are located a few blocks east of the Gaff House on Embassy Row. Notable ambassadors who have resided in the Gaff house include former President of Colombia, Andrés Pastrana. The 2009 property value of the Gaff House is $8,061,440.

== Architecture ==
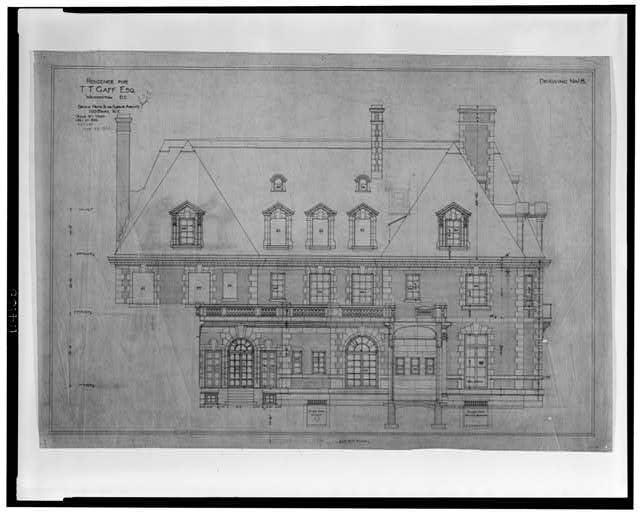
Drawing designs by de Sibour of the Thomas T. Gaff House

The exterior architecture of the Thomas T. Gaff House is an example of a 17th-century Châteauesque manor, but only two rooms in the house follow French style. Gaff instructed the designers to include novel conveniences such as a hot-air system to dry clothes, a trapdoor to his icehouse so that deliveries could be made directly from the street, and cork insulation for his wine cellar. The interior features a mixture of 17th- and 18th-century designs. The main hall and dining room are lined with wooden paneling, Elizabethan wainscoting, and a sideboard that was originally used in an Italian monastery. The reception hall, which at one time doubled as a living room, contains a wooden stair rail with baroque scrollwork and walls that are covered with Louis XIII style oak paneling. The drawing room resembles 18th-century interior design with lighter wood used for paneling and basic geometric lines.

In the sitting room, a hidden, movable wooden wall reveals the two-story Edwardian ballroom, which features a multivaulted wooden ceiling and ornamental plasterwork. The wood that covers the ceiling was discovered during a repair operation. A dome with a stained-glass cupola is located above the center of the ballroom. This room is used for charity balls, formal dinners, and as a gallery and concert hall.

There were originally 220 drawings of the house's design by de Sibour, but only 20 survived.
