= Lawrenceburg, Indiana =

- City
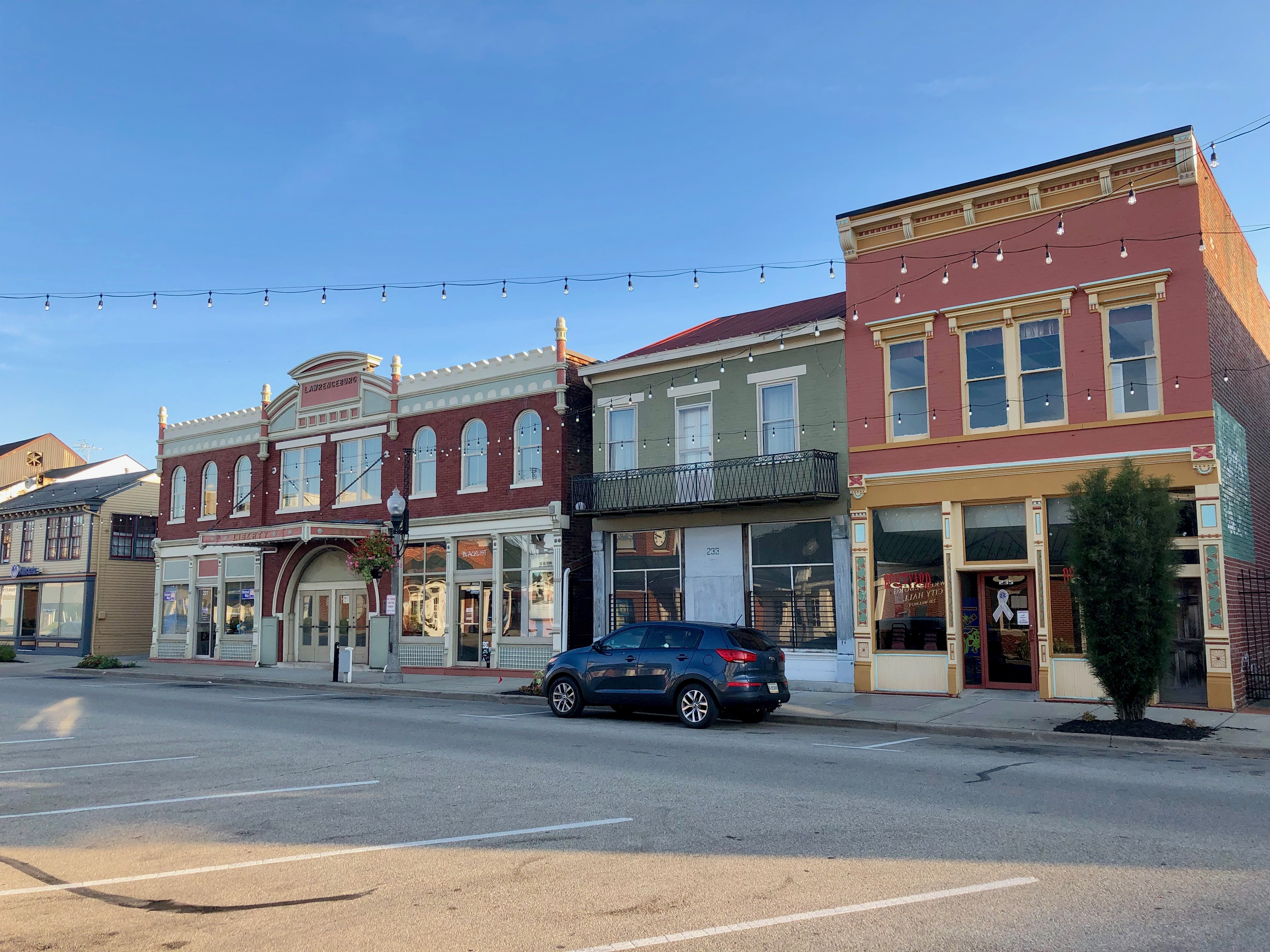
- Walnut Street in Downtown Lawrenceburg
- Nickname: Whisky City
- Motto: A City on the Rise!
- Location of Lawrenceburg in Dearborn County, Indiana.
- Coordinates: 39°07′06″N 84°53′06″W
- Country: United States
- State: Indiana
- County: Dearborn
- Township: Lawrenceburg
- Founder: Samuel C. Vance

Government
  - Type: Mayor–council government
  - Mayor: Kelly Mollaun (R)

Area
  - Total: 5.55 sq mi (14.37 km^{2})
  - Land: 5.29 sq mi (13.69 km^{2})
  - Water: 0.26 sq mi (0.68 km^{2}) 5.18%
- Elevation: 784 ft (239 m)

Population (2020)
  - Total: 5,129
  - Density: 970.4/sq mi (374.67/km^{2})
- Time zone: UTC-5 (EST)
  - Summer (DST): UTC-4 (EDT)
- ZIP code: 47025
- Area code: 812
- FIPS code: 18-42462
- GNIS feature ID: 2395648
- Website: thinklawrenceburg.com

Lawrenceburg is a city in and the county seat of Dearborn County, Indiana, United States. The population was 5,129 at the 2020 census. It is the largest city in Dearborn County. Lawrenceburg is in southeast Indiana, southeast of Indianapolis and on the Ohio River west of Cincinnati.

== History ==
Founded in 1802, Lawrenceburg was named for the maiden name of the wife of founder Samuel C. Vance.

On February 12, 1861, Abraham Lincoln made a pre-inaugural speech from his train platform while stopped in Lawrenceburg.

In the 19th century, Lawrenceburg became an important trading center for riverboats on the Ohio River.

The Dearborn County Courthouse, Downtown Lawrenceburg Historic District, Hamline Chapel United Methodist Church, the Liberty Theatre, the Dunn Home, The Daniel S. Major House, and Vance-Tousey House are listed on the National Register of Historic Places.

== Geography ==
The City of Lawrenceburg is located in the Ohio River Valley and is situated on the banks of the Ohio River. Lawrenceburg is located on the west side of the Greater Cincinnati, Ohio tri-state metro area.

According to the 2010 census, Lawrenceburg has a total area of 5.21 square miles (13.49 km^{2}), of which 4.94 square miles (12.79 km^{2}) (or 94.82%) is land and 0.27 square miles (0.70 km^{2}) (or 5.18%) is water.

== Demographics ==
Historical population
Census	Pop.	Note	%±
1850	2,651		—
1870	3,159		—
1880	4,668		47.8%
1890	4,284		−8.2%
1900	4,326		1.0%
1910	3,930		−9.2%
1920	3,466		−11.8%
1930	4,072		17.5%
1940	4,413		8.4%
1950	4,806		8.9%
1960	5,004		4.1%
1970	4,636		−7.4%
1980	4,403		−5.0%
1990	4,375		−0.6%
2000	4,685		7.1%
2010	5,042		7.6%
2020	5,129		1.7%
U.S. Decennial Census

=== 2020 census ===
As of the 2020 census, Lawrenceburg had a population of 5,129. The median age was 39.3 years. 20.5% of residents were under the age of 18 and 19.9% of residents were 65 years of age or older. For every 100 females there were 87.9 males, and for every 100 females age 18 and over there were 85.5 males age 18 and over.

99.9% of residents lived in urban areas, while 0.1% lived in rural areas.

There were 2,131 households in Lawrenceburg, of which 27.6% had children under the age of 18 living in them. Of all households, 29.6% were married-couple households, 22.4% were households with a male householder and no spouse or partner present, and 38.8% were households with a female householder and no spouse or partner present. About 39.6% of all households were made up of individuals and 15.8% had someone living alone who was 65 years of age or older.

There were 2,333 housing units, of which 8.7% were vacant. The homeowner vacancy rate was 2.1% and the rental vacancy rate was 4.6%.

Racial composition as of the 2020 census
Race	Number	Percent
White	4,570	89.1%
Black or African American	126	2.5%
American Indian and Alaska Native	15	0.3%
Asian	41	0.8%
Native Hawaiian and Other Pacific Islander	0	0.0%
Some other race	62	1.2%
Two or more races	315	6.1%
Hispanic or Latino (of any race)	96	1.9%

=== 2010 census ===
As of the census of 2010, there were 5,042 people, 2,057 households, and 1,142 families living in the city. The population density was 1,020.6 inhabitants per square mile (394.1/km^{2}). There were 2,313 housing units at an average density of 468.2 per square mile (180.8/km^{2}). The racial makeup of the city was 93.5% White, 3.0% African American, 0.3% Native American, 0.8% Asian, 0.3% from other races, and 2.2% from two or more races. Hispanic or Latino of any race were 1.2% of the population.

There were 2,057 households, of which 31.3% had children under the age of 18 living with them, 31.4% were married couples living together, 17.8% had a female householder with no husband present, 6.3% had a male householder with no wife present, and 44.5% were non-families. 39.1% of all households were made up of individuals, and 13.5% had someone living alone who was 65 years of age or older. The average household size was 2.26 and the average family size was 2.96.

The median age in the city was 35.5 years. 24.1% of residents were under the age of 18; 10.6% were between the ages of 18 and 24; 26.6% were from 25 to 44; 24.1% were from 45 to 64; and 14.7% were 65 years of age or older. The gender makeup of the city was 49.0% male and 51.0% female.

=== 2000 census ===
As of the census of 2000, there were 4,685 people, 1,914 households, and 1,140 families living in the city. The population density was 956.1 inhabitants per square mile (369.2/km^{2}). There were 2,162 housing units at an average density of 441.2 per square mile (170.3/km^{2}). The racial makeup of the city was 93.81% White. The two largest ethnic groups in Lawrenceburg and Lawrenceburg Township are 29% German Americans, and 19% Irish Americans, 4.18% African American, 0.15% Native American, 0.45% Asian, 0.04% Pacific Islander, 0.32% from other races, and 1.05% from two or more races. Hispanic or Latino of any race were 0.85% of the population.

There were 1,914 households, of which 31.0% had children under the age of 18 living with them, 36.2% were married couples living together, 18.4% had a female householder with no husband present, and 40.4% were non-families. 34.4% of all households were made up of individuals, and 13.5% had someone living alone who was 65 years of age or older. The average household size was 2.28 and the average family size was 2.94.

In the city, the population was spread out, with 24.2% under the age of 18, 11.5% from 18 to 24, 28.3% from 25 to 44, 20.1% from 45 to 64, and 15.8% who were 65 years of age or older. The median age was 35 years. For every 100 females, there were 88.5 males. For every 100 females age 18 and over, there were 86.4 males.

The median income for a household in the city was $29,306, and the median income for a family was $37,978. Males had a median income of $31,543 versus $21,985 for females. The per capita income for the city was $15,656. About 10.3% of families and 14.9% of the population were below the poverty line, including 17.9% of those under age 18 and 23.8% of those age 65 or over.

== Economy ==
=== Industry ===
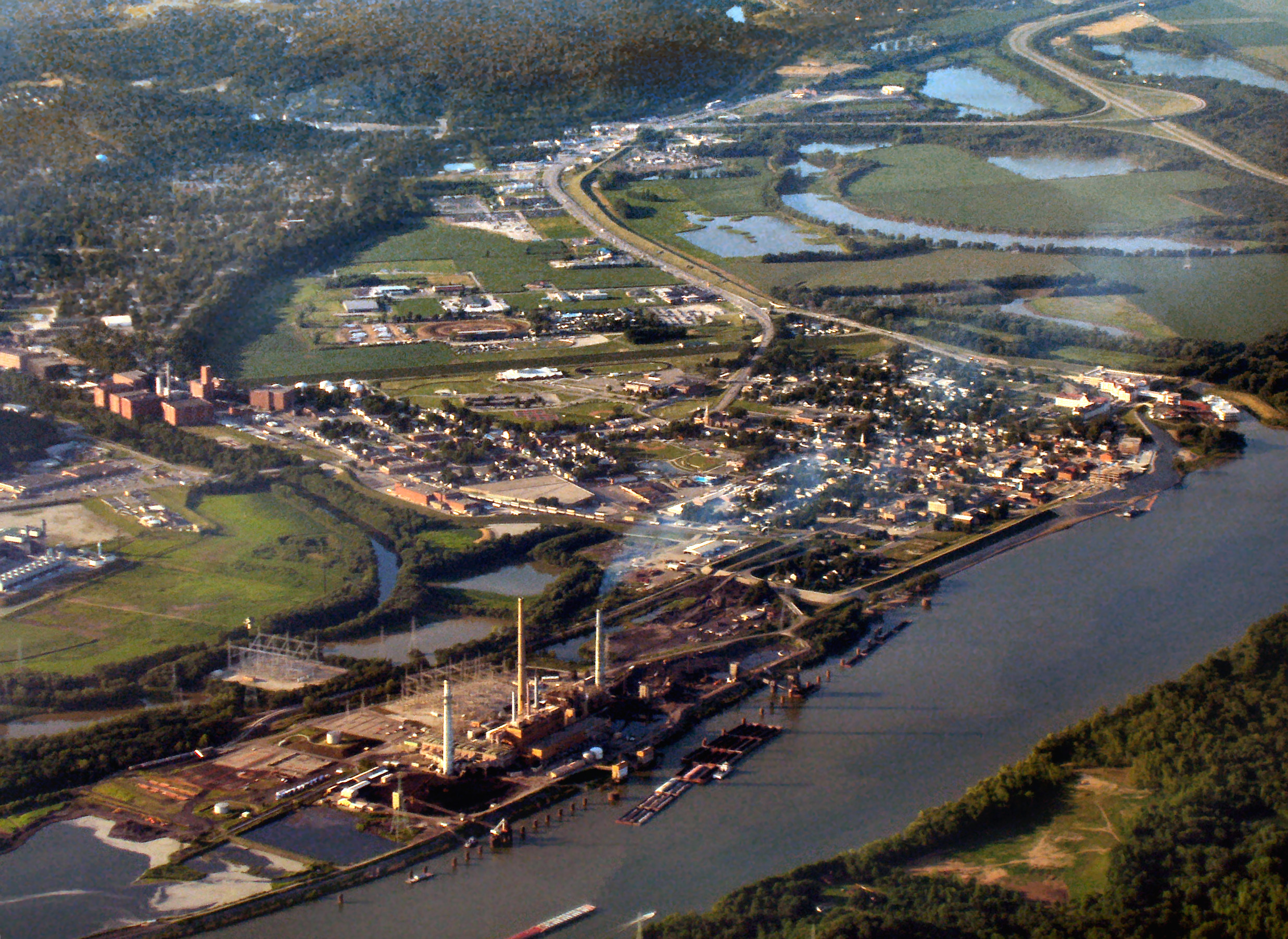
Tanner's Creek Generating Station and the city of Lawrenceburg

Lawrenceburg was home to the Tanner's Creek Generating Station, now AEP (Tanner's Creek Generating Station has been demolished).

Lawrenceburg has had a long history with whiskey production, earning the city the nickname Whiskey City, U.S.A. MGP Indiana, formerly Seagram's, operates within Lawrenceburg, and distills various alcoholic spirits (e.g. Bulleit Bourbon).

Another industry located within Lawrenceburg is Anchor Glass Container (formerly Thatcher Glass).

Lawrenceburg is also home to Perfect North Slopes, a ski area located off Route 1. It boasts hills for skiing, snowboarding, and snowing tubing.

Hollywood Casino Lawrenceburg (formerly Argosy Casino) is found in Lawrenceburg, and is the closest Indiana riverboat casino to downtown Cincinnati.

== Education ==
The Lawrenceburg School District consists of the Lawrenceburg Primary School, Central Elementary, Greendale Middle School, Lawrenceburg High School and St. Lawrence Catholic School. Lawrenceburg's school name for sports is the "Lawrenceburg Tigers" while St. Lawrence's sports name is called "Panthers".

The city has a free lending library, the Lawrenceburg Public Library District. Lawrenceburg residents may also obtain a library card at the Aurora Public Library in Aurora.

== Notable people ==
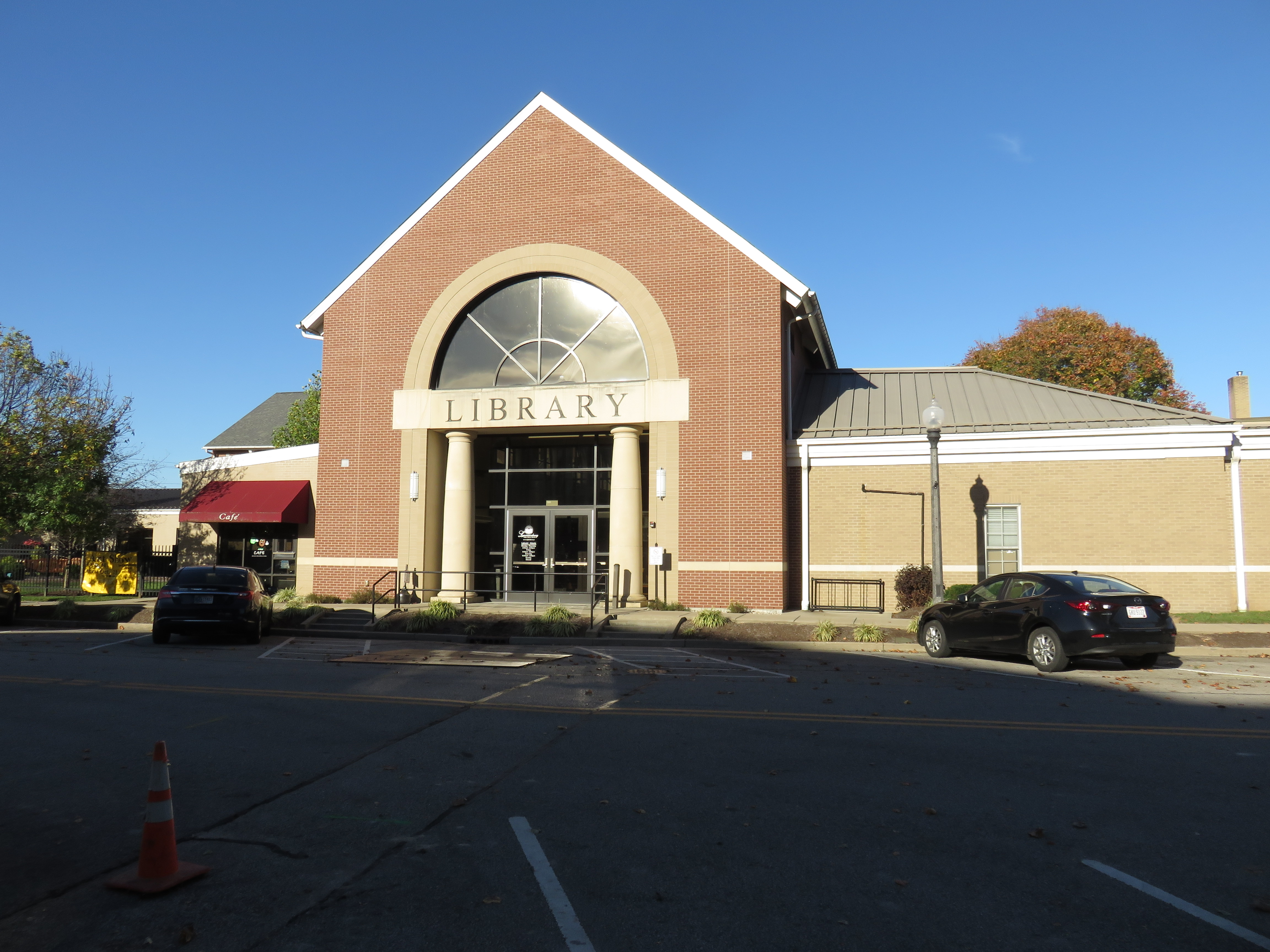
Lawrenceburg Public Library

- Henry Ward Beecher, minister and abolitionist, had his first church here in the 1830s.
- Henry G. Blasdel, first Governor of Nevada; born near Lawrenceburg.
- George P. Buell, Union general during the Civil War.
- Winfield T. Durbin, 25th Governor of Indiana; born in Lawrenceburg.
- James B. Eads, engineer and inventor; born in Lawrenceburg.
- Gunnar Garfors, record-breaking traveler, was an exchange student in Lawrenceburg.
- Nick Goepper, freestyle skier for Olympic Team USA
- Noah Knigga, American football player
- James H. Lane, Union general during the Civil War and U.S. Senator from Kansas; born in Lawrenceburg.
- Billy McCool, MLB All-Star pitcher, was raised in Lawrenceburg.
- Mason Parris, Olympic freestyle and folkstyle wrestler for Team USA
- Albert G. Porter, 19th Governor of Indiana from 1881 to 1885.
- John Coit Spooner, Wisconsin politician and lawyer, was born in Lawrenceburg.

== See also ==
- List of cities and towns along the Ohio River
- Whitewater Canal
- Ohio River
