= List of Indiana state historical markers in Dearborn County =

Location of Dearborn County in Indiana

This is a list of the Indiana state historical markers in Dearborn County.

This is intended to be a detailed table of the official state historical marker placed in Dearborn County, Indiana, United States by the Indiana Historical Bureau. The location of the historical marker and its latitude and longitude coordinates are included below when available, along with its name, year of placement, and topics as recorded by the Historical Bureau. There is 1 historical marker located in Dearborn County.

== Historical marker ==
Marker title	Image	Year placed	Location	Topics
Canal Junction		1999	Northwestern corner of the Whitewater River bridge at the junction of Campbell and State Streets across the railroad tracks, on the southern side of West Harrison; 39°15′3.4″N 84°49′12.9″W	Business, Industry, and Labor, Transportation

== See also ==
- List of Indiana state historical markers
- National Register of Historic Places listings in Dearborn County, Indiana
