= National Register of Historic Places listings in Ohio County, Indiana =

Location of Ohio County in Indiana

This is a list of the National Register of Historic Places listings in Ohio County, Indiana.

This is intended to be a complete list of the properties and districts on National Register of Historic Places in Ohio County, Indiana, United States. Latitude and longitude coordinates are provided for many National Register properties and districts; these locations may be seen together in a map.

There are four properties and districts listed on the National Register in the county.

Properties and districts located in incorporated areas display the name of the municipality, while properties and districts in unincorporated areas display the name of their civil township. Properties and districts split between multiple jurisdictions display the names of all jurisdictions.

This National Park Service list is complete through NPS recent listings posted August 22, 2025.

== Current listings ==
	Name on the Register	Image	Date listed	Location	City or town	Description
1	Clore Plow Works-J.W. Whitlock and Company	Clore Plow Works-J.W. Whitlock and Company	September 17, 1999 (#99001152)	212 S. Walnut St. 38°56′52″N 84°51′20″W	Rising Sun	
2	Laughery Creek Bridge	Laughery Creek Bridge	September 29, 1976 (#76000018)	South of Aurora west of State Road 56; 39°01′28″N 84°53′09″W	Randolph Township	Extends into Dearborn County
3	Rising Sun Historic District	Rising Sun Historic District	October 12, 2006 (#06000935)	Roughly bounded by the Union and Soldier's Cemeteries, High St., Front St., and Maiden Ln. 38°56′54″N 84°51′09″W	Rising Sun	
4	Speakman-Miller-Kittle Farm		December 11, 2023 (#100009592)	10405 Old State Road 56; 39°01′22″N 84°53′09″W	Rising Sun	

== See also ==
- List of National Historic Landmarks in Indiana
- National Register of Historic Places listings in Indiana
- Listings in neighboring counties: Boone (KY), Dearborn, Ripley, Switzerland
- List of Indiana state historical markers in Ohio County
