= List of Indiana state historical markers in Ohio County =

Location of Ohio County in Indiana

This is a list of the Indiana state historical markers in Ohio County.

This is intended to be a detailed table of the official state historical marker placed in Ohio County, Indiana, United States by the Indiana Historical Bureau. The location of the historical marker and its latitude and longitude coordinates are included below when available, along with its name, year of placement, and topics as recorded by the Historical Bureau. There are 3 historical markers located in Ohio County.

== Historical markers ==
Marker title	Image	Year placed	Location	Topics
Lochry's Defeat		1961	Old State State Road 56 at the Dearborn County line, 350 feet north of Laughery Creek and north of French (there is another, a roadside marker just south of Triple Wipple Bridge); 39°1′33″N 84°53′10″W	Military, Early Settlement and Exploration
The Barkshire Family		2018	201 N. Poplar St., Rising Sun; 38°56′58.4″N 84°51′5.9″W	
Defiance of Black Codes, Barkshire v State of Indiana		2021	413 Main St., Rising Sun; 38°57′1.3″N 84°51′24.3″W	African American; Law & Court Case

== See also ==
- List of Indiana state historical markers
- National Register of Historic Places listings in Ohio County, Indiana
