= Hillforest =

Historic house in Indiana, United States

- Hillforest (Forest Hill)
- U.S. National Register of Historic Places
- U.S. National Historic Landmark
- U.S. Historic district – Contributing property
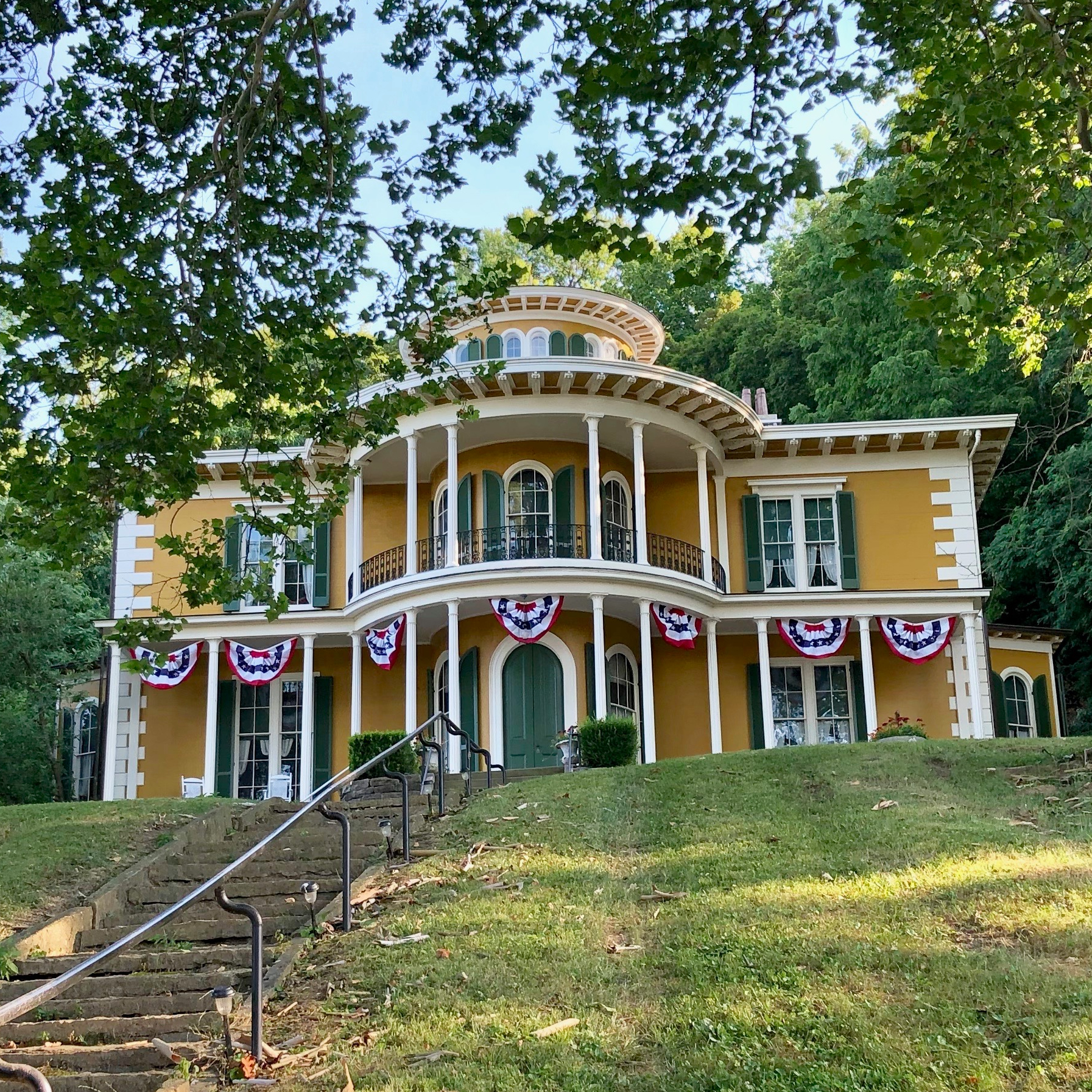

- Location within Indiana Location within the United States
- Location: 213 Fifth Street, Aurora, Indiana
- Coordinates: 39°3′13.9″N 84°54′6.02″W
- Area: 11 acres (4.5 ha)
- Built: 1852
- Architect: Isaiah Rogers
- Architectural style: Renaissance, Italian Villa
- NRHP reference No.: 71000005

Significant dates
- Added to NRHP: August 5, 1971
- Designated NHL: October 5, 1992

The Hillforest Mansion, also known as the Thomas Gaff House, is located at 213 Fifth Street, in Aurora, Indiana. Built in 1855 on a bluff above the Ohio River, it is one of the finest surviving examples of an Italian Renaissance estate house, and a rare well-preserved example of the work of architect Isaiah Rogers. The mansion, which was designated a National Historic Landmark in 1992, is owned and operated by Hillforest Historical Foundation. It is located in the Downtown Aurora Historic District.

== Description and history ==
Hillforest was designed by Isaiah Rogers and built in 1855 for Thomas Gaff (1808–1884), a Scottish born businessman who moved to Aurora in the 1840s. Gaff and his siblings had a large number of business interests, including alcohol production (distilleries and breweries), railroads, and steamships. The design of Hillforest is evocative of the steamships that plied the Ohio and Mississippi Rivers in the 19th century.

The Hillforest estate is 11 acres (4.5 ha) in size, and includes, in addition to the house, formally landscaped gardens, a carriage house (a non-historic 1970s reconstruction), and land historically used for farming. The house is a 2-story frame structure covered by a low-pitch hip roof. Its main facade is finished in vertical wide board siding, while the other facades are finished in shiplap siding, with wooden quoin blocks at the corners. A semicircular section projects at the center of the main facade, rising to a belvedere on the roof. A single-story porch extends across the full width of the facade, with a second-story porch around the central projection. Windows are of full length, removing the need for doors to access the porches. The interior is sumptuously finished, with original Trompe-l'œil artwork on the walls.

The property remained in the Gaff family until 1926, when it was purchased by William Stark, a furniture manufacturer. The house served as a VFW lodge for a time, and was turned into a museum in 1956.

== See also ==
- List of National Historic Landmarks in Indiana
- National Register of Historic Places listings in Dearborn County, Indiana
- Thomas T. Gaff House, Gaff's house in Washington, DC
