= Noah Knigga =

American football linebacker (born 2006)

No. 46 – Eastern Michigan Eagles
- Position: Linebacker
- Class: Freshman

Personal information
- Born: October 5, 2006 (age 20)
- Listed height: 6 ft 1 in (1.85 m)
- Listed weight: 202 lb (92 kg)

Career information
- High school: Lawrenceburg (Lawrenceburg, Indiana)
- College: Eastern Michigan (2025–present)
- Stats at ESPN

Noah Ryan Knigga (kə-NAY-guh; born October 5, 2006) is an American college football linebacker for the Eastern Michigan Eagles of the Mid-American Conference (MAC).

During his junior year of high school at Lawrenceburg, Knigga went viral online and became an internet meme due to his surname's visual resemblance to the colloquial term nigga.

== Early life ==
Noah Knigga was born in Indiana, on October 5, 2006, to Staci Shipley and Ryan Knigga. Knigga was born into a sports-oriented family as his mother played volleyball; meanwhile, his father played football at Lawrenceburg High School and later at Indiana State University. Having graduated from Lawrenceburg in 1996, Ryan has served as the high school's football coach since 2011 and ultimately became Noah's coach. Noah's twin sister, Natalie, is also involved in sports and signed a letter of intent to play college volleyball at Saint Mary of the Woods College.

A two-sport varsity athlete at Lawrenceburg, Knigga played both football and basketball primarily at the outside linebacker and small forward positions, respectively. Though mainly a defensive player in football, he also played a considerable amount at tight end. Knigga also played junior varsity baseball as a first baseman and designated hitter. In the 2023–24 basketball season, Knigga and his sister were both named the MVPs of the boy's and girl's Rivertown Classic Basketball Tournaments, respectively.

Knigga and the Tigers' football team played against the Gibson Southern Titans in the regional final in 2021. The following season, Knigga and the Tigers defeated Southridge in the Class 3A Regional final, before beating Monrovia in the Indiana High School Athletic Association (IHSAA) Class 3A semistate football championship. The Tigers then reached the IHSAA 3A state final, played at Lucas Oil Stadium against Bishop Chatard. Lawrenceburg held a 13–1 record entering the game, as their defense ranked as the best in Indiana in terms of points allowed, allowing just over six per game. Knigga was one of the team's defensive stars, recording 79 tackles, 14 tackles for loss, and 4 sacks prior to the state final. Knigga recorded multiple sacks during the game but Lawrenceburg lost to Chatard, 34–14. As a junior, he was considered one of the best linebackers in the state, being named to the Class 3A junior all-state team.

=== Recruitment and virality ===
Knigga was listed as a two-star recruit by Rivals and a three-star recruit by 247Sports and ESPN, with the latter giving him a 75 scout grade.

In September 2023, Knigga made unofficial school visits to Purdue and West Virginia's football programs. He also made later visits to Miami (Ohio) and James Madison's programs. In January 2024, Knigga went viral online for his surname after making a social media post announcing his then upcoming second unofficial visit to West Virginia. The name's resemblance to the word nigga was a key factor in internet memes and many internet users speculated on its pronunciation. On his eponymous show, ESPN personality and former Indianapolis Colts punter Pat McAfee discussed Knigga, drawing further media attention to him. In an interview with Robert Griffin III, an American football sportscaster and retired American football player, Knigga and his family clarified their surname is pronounced kuh-nay-ga.

He received various offers from Division I FBS schools, including an early power conference offer from West Virginia, as well as Miami (Ohio) and Arkansas State, among others. In March, Knigga received an offer from Eastern Michigan and made an official visit to the school on June 9, before verbally committing to the Eagles on June 14. Knigga officially signed a letter of intent to play for Eastern Michigan on December 4.

== College career ==
Knigga began his college football career in 2025 as a linebacker on Eastern Michigan's roster. In August, Knigga released a line of baseball caps featuring his surname in block lettering.

== See also ==
- 2025 college football recruiting class
