= George Street Bridge (Aurora, Indiana) =

- U.S. National Register of Historic Places
- U.S. Historic district – Contributing property
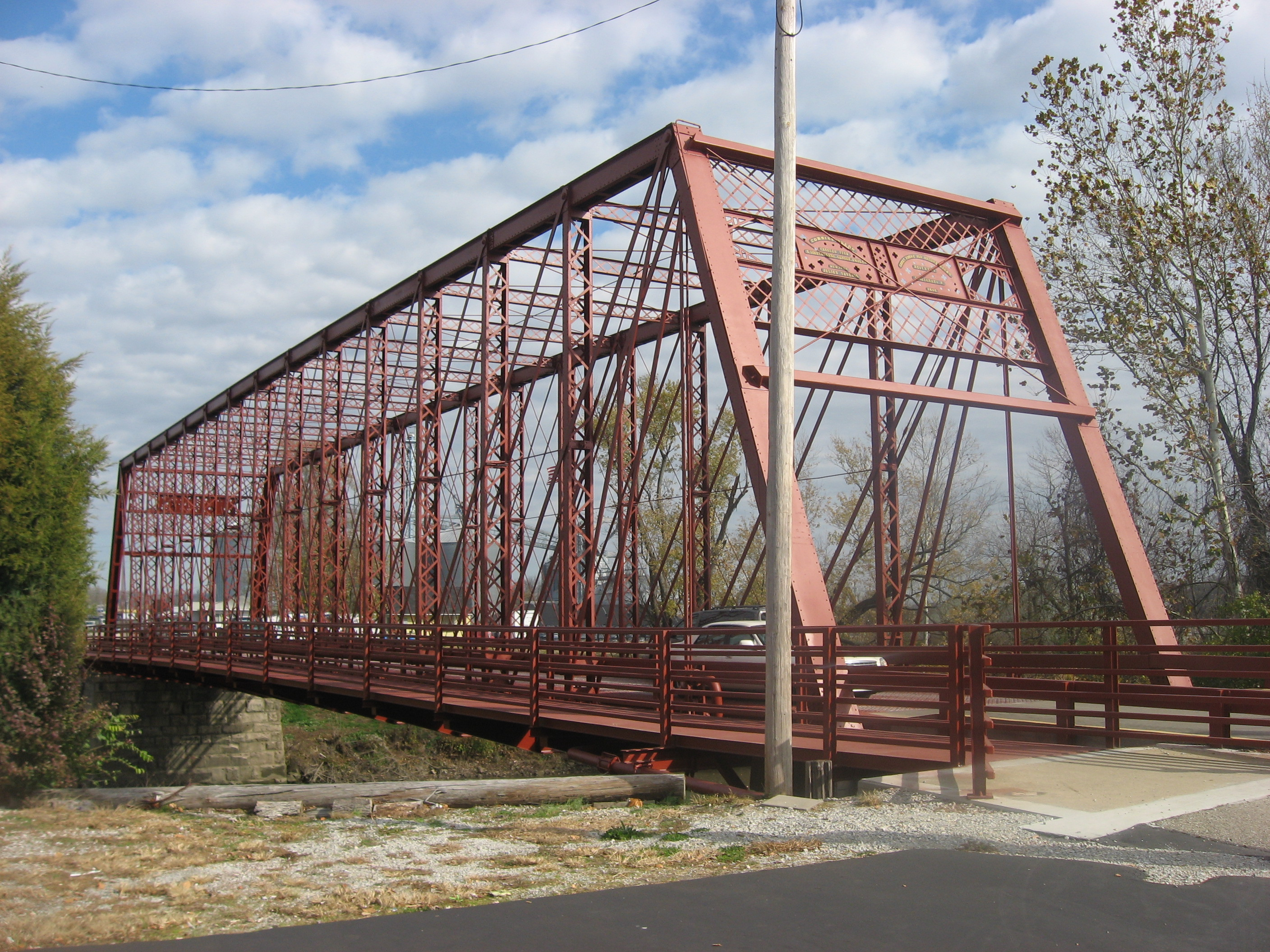
- George Street Bridge, November 2012

- Location within Indiana Location within the United States
- Location: George, Main, and Importing Sts., Aurora, Indiana
- Coordinates: 39°3′29″N 84°53′58″W
- Area: less than one acre
- Built: 1887
- Built by: Lomas Forge & Bridge Works
- Architectural style: Whipple truss
- NRHP reference No.: 84001012
- Added to NRHP: March 1, 1984

George Street Bridge, also known as County Bridge No. 159, is a historic Whipple truss bridge located at Aurora, Indiana. It was built by the Lomas Forge & Bridge Works in 1887. It traverses Hogan Creek and measures 199 feet, 4 inches, long. It is one of the oldest iron bridges in Indiana.

It was added to the National Register of Historic Places in 1984. It is located in the Downtown Aurora Historic District.
