= Levi Stevens House =

Historic house in Indiana, United States

- U.S. National Register of Historic Places
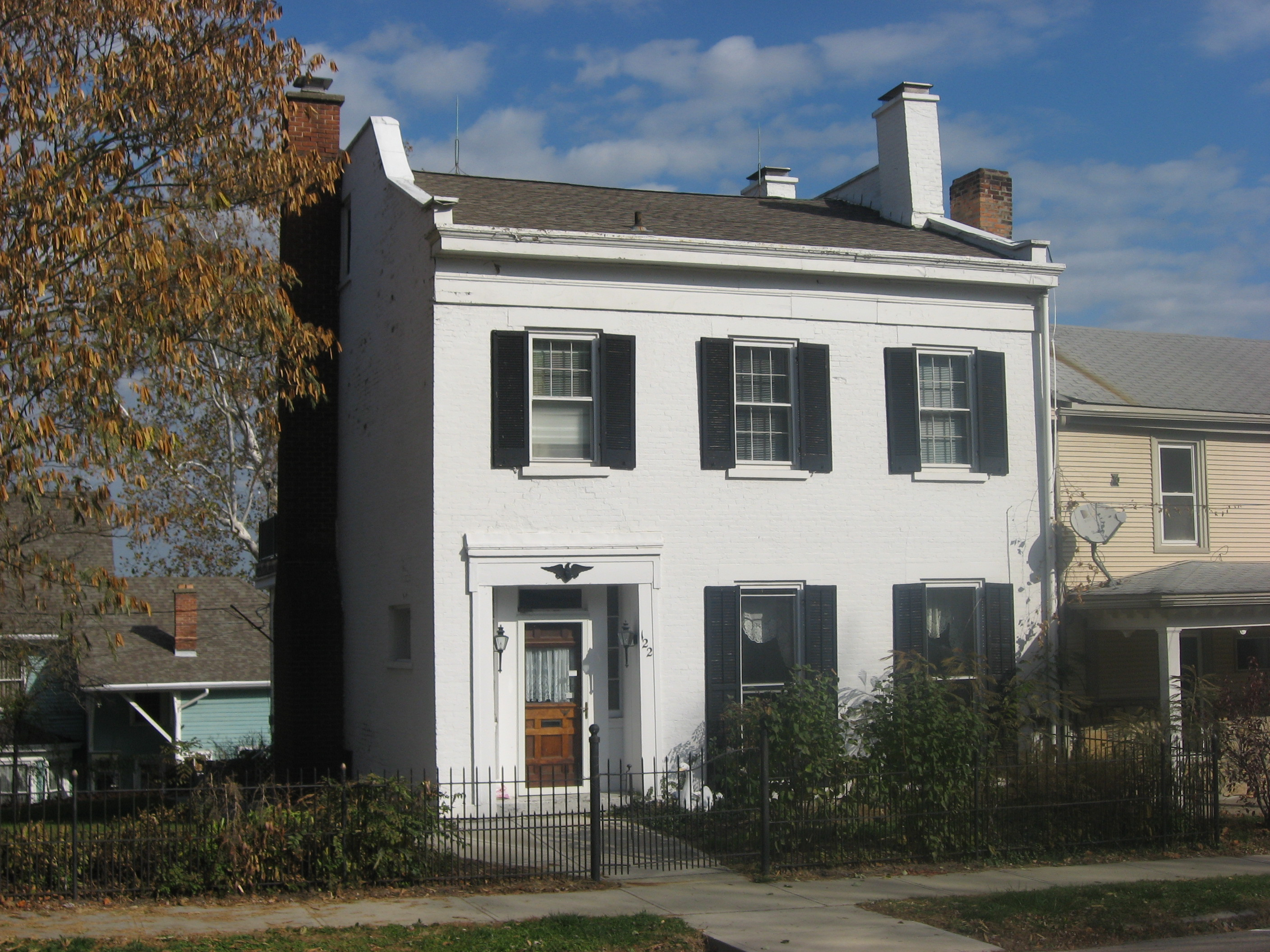
- Levi Stevens House, November 2012

- Location within Indiana Location within the United States
- Location: 122 5th St., Aurora, Indiana
- Coordinates: 39°3′13″N 84°53′59″W
- Area: less than one acre
- Built: 1849
- Built by: unknown
- Architectural style: Greek Revival, 2/3 I-house
- NRHP reference No.: 96000599
- Added to NRHP: May 30, 1996

Levi Stevens House, also known as the Stevens-Thatcher-Crosson House, is a historic home located at Aurora, Indiana. It was built in 1849, and is a 2 1/2-story, three-bay, Greek Revival style 2/3 I-house. It has an L-shaped plan, sits on a rough-cut limestone foundation, and has a low, side-gable roof. It has a one-story rear kitchen addition.

It was added to the National Register of Historic Places in 1996.

Facade restoration of paint and shutters was completed in 2018.
