= Downtown Lawrenceburg Historic District =

Historic district in Indiana, United States

- U.S. National Register of Historic Places
- U.S. Historic district
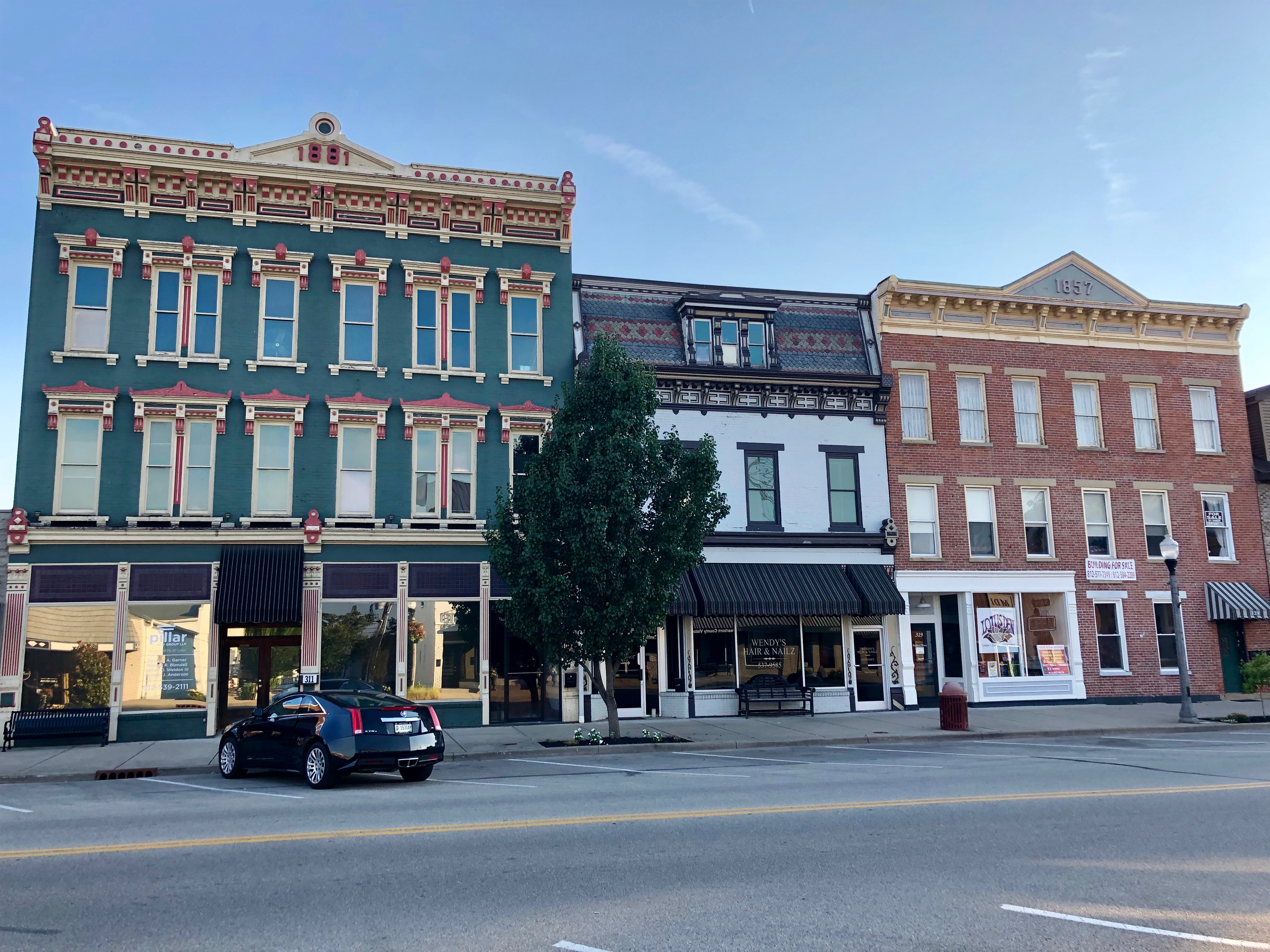
- Contributing Structures on Walnut Street in the Historic District

- Location within Indiana Location within the United States
- Location: Roughly bounded by ConRail Tracks, Charlotte, Tate, Williams, and Elm Sts., Lawrenceburg, Indiana
- Coordinates: 39°05′37″N 84°50′54″W
- Area: 65 acres (26 ha)
- Built: 1802
- Architectural style: Late Victorian, Federal, Greek Revival
- NRHP reference No.: 84001009
- Added to NRHP: March 1, 1984

Downtown Lawrenceburg Historic District is a national historic district located at Lawrenceburg, Indiana. The district encompasses 257 contributing buildings and 2 contributing objects in the central business district and surrounding residential sections of Lawrenceburg. The district developed between about 1815 and 1900, and includes notable examples of Late Victorian, Federal, and Greek Revival style architecture. Located in the district are the separately listed Dearborn County Courthouse and Hamline Chapel United Methodist Church. Other notable buildings include the Trade and Industrial Building (1881), Lawrenceburg Theater (1875), Jesse Hunt Hotel (1818), the birthplaces of James B. Eads and Louis Skidmore.

It was added to the National Register of Historic Places in 1984.
