= First Evangelical United Church of Christ =

Historic church in Indiana, United States

- U.S. National Register of Historic Places
- U.S. Historic district – Contributing property
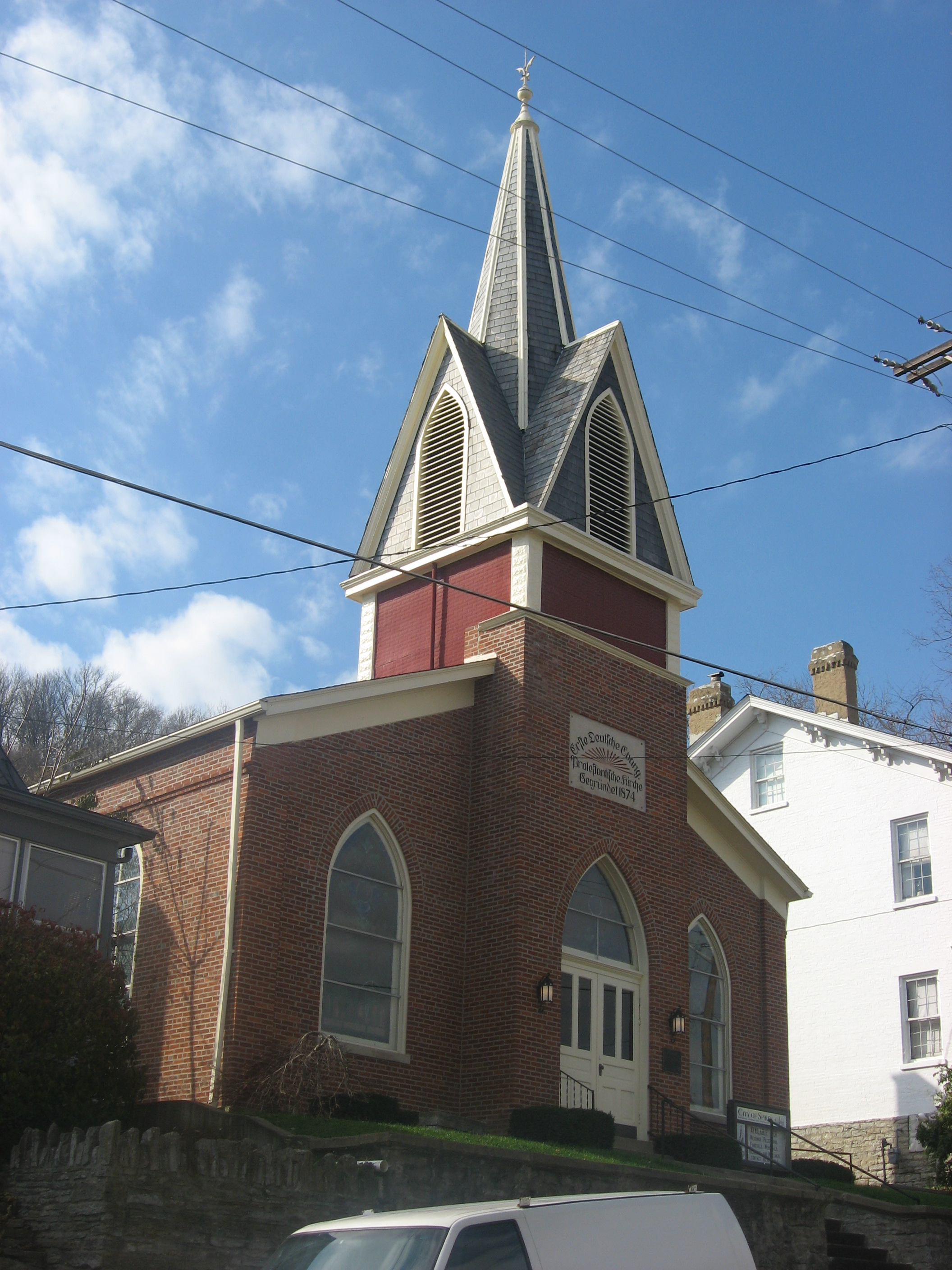

- Location within Indiana Location within the United States
- Location: 111 Fifth St., Aurora, Indiana
- Coordinates: 39°3′11″N 84°53′56″W
- Area: less than one acre
- Built: 1848, 1911, 1932-1934
- Architectural style: Gothic
- NRHP reference No.: 94001104
- Added to NRHP: September 23, 1994

First Evangelical United Church of Christ, also known as the Fifth Street Church and German Reformed Church, is a historic United Church of Christ church located at 111 Fifth Street in Aurora, Indiana. It was originally constructed in 1848 as a Greek Revival style Baptist church. It was remodeled in 1911 in the Gothic Revival style. It is a one-story, red brick building measuring 40 feet, 6 inches, wide by 60 feet deep. It features arched openings and a projecting front tower topped by an octagonal spire. A parish hall was added to the church between 1932 and 1934. It is the oldest church building in Aurora.

It was added to the National Register of Historic Places in 1994. It is located in the Downtown Aurora Historic District.
