= Downtown Aurora Historic District =

Historic district in Indiana, United States

- U.S. National Register of Historic Places
- U.S. Historic district
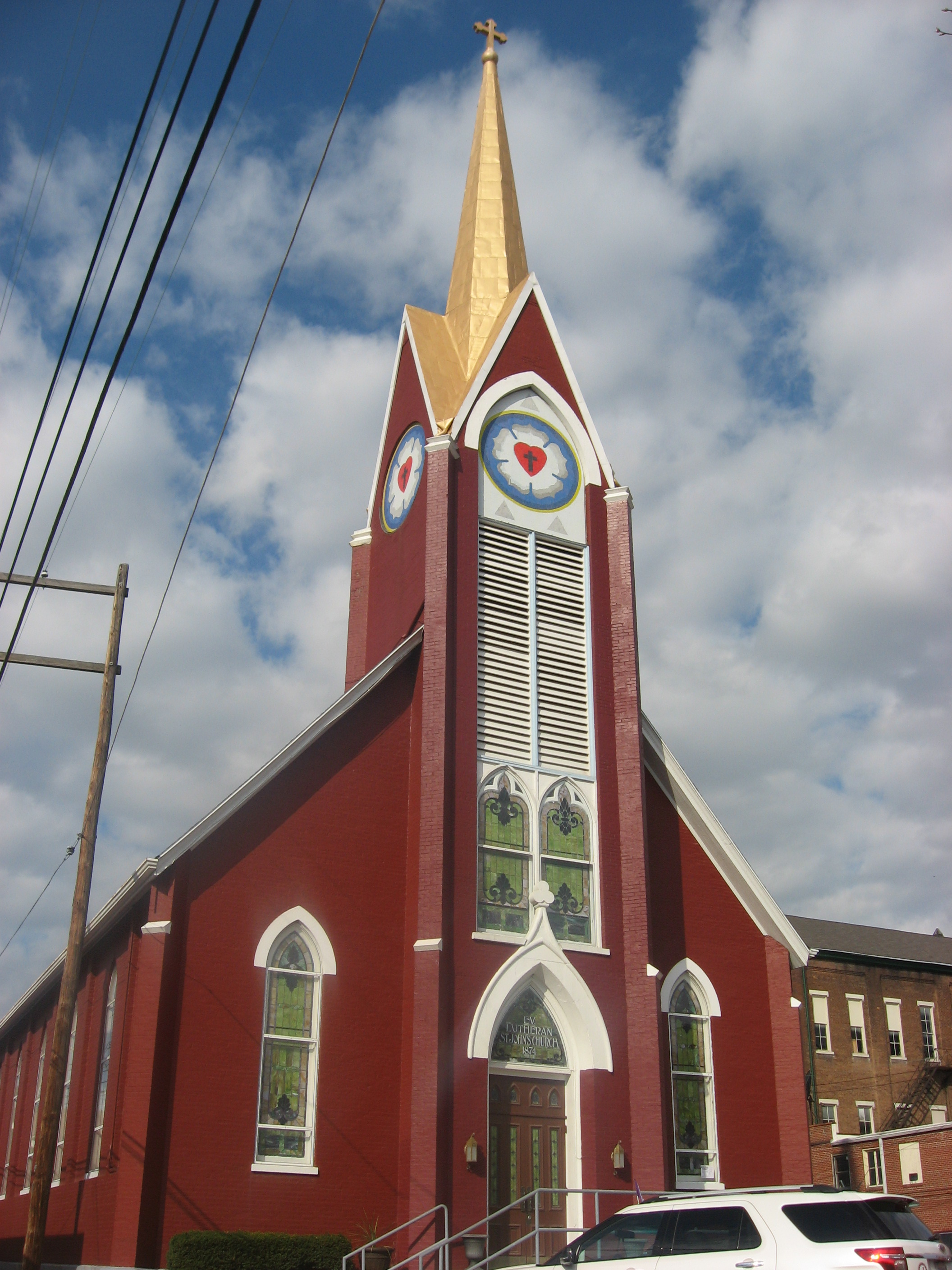
- St. John's Evangelical Lutheran Church, November 2012

- Location within Indiana Location within the United States
- Location: Bounded by Importing, Water, Market, Fifth, and Exporting Sts., Aurora, Indiana
- Coordinates: 39°03′14″N 84°54′02″W
- Area: 100 acres (40 ha)
- Architect: Rogers, Isaiah; Et al.
- Architectural style: Multiple
- NRHP reference No.: 94001134
- Added to NRHP: September 8, 1994

Downtown Aurora Historic District is a national historic district located at Aurora, Indiana. The district encompasses 272 contributing buildings, 1 contributing site, and 3 contributing structures in the central business district of Aurora. The district developed between about 1830 and 1944, and includes notable examples of Italianate, Federal, and Greek Revival style architecture. Located in the district are the separately listed Aurora City Hall, Aurora Methodist Episcopal Church, Aurora Public Library, First Evangelical United Church of Christ, First Presbyterian Church, George Street Bridge, Hillforest (Forest Hill), Lewis Hurlbert, Sr. House, Leive, Parks and Stapp Opera House, and George Sutton Medical Office. Other notable buildings include the T. and J.W. Gaff Distillery (1843), First National Bank (1924), I.O.O.F. Hall (1887), B&O Railroad Station (1911–1917), John Neff Building, Chamber Stevens & Co. Dry Goods Store, U.S. Post Office (1935), Star Milling Co. (1891), and St. John's Evangelical Lutheran Church (1874).

It was added to the National Register of Historic Places in 1994.
