= Lewis Hurlbert Sr. House =

Historic house in Indiana, United States

- U.S. National Register of Historic Places
- U.S. Historic district – Contributing property
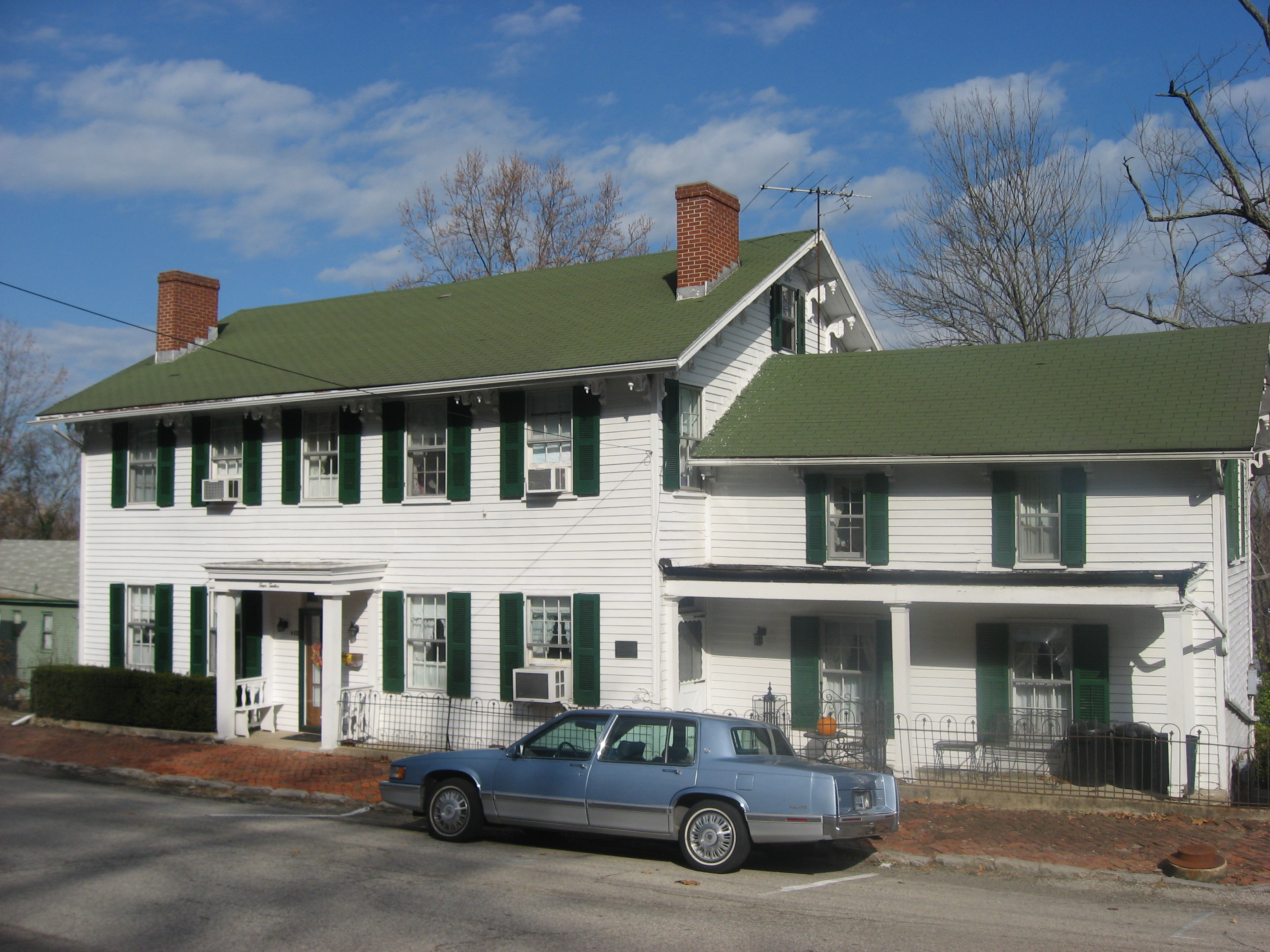
- Lewis Hurlbert Sr. House, November 2012

- Location within Indiana Location within the United States
- Location: 412 Fifth St., Aurora, Indiana
- Coordinates: 39°3′17″N 84°54′13″W
- Area: less than one acre
- Built: 1844
- Architectural style: Greek Revival, Italianate
- NRHP reference No.: 94001350
- Added to NRHP: November 25, 1994

Lewis Hurlbert Sr. House is a historic home located at Aurora, Indiana. It was built in 1844, and is a two-story, five-bay, frame dwelling with Italianate and Greek Revival style design elements. It has a double pile plan, sits on a cut limestone foundation, and side gable roof. It has a two-story addition built in the mid-19th century. Also on the property are the contributing stable, outhouse, and two sections of cat iron fencing.

It was added to the National Register of Historic Places in 1994. It is located in the Downtown Aurora Historic District.
