= George Sutton Medical Office =

- Dr. George Sutton Medical Office Building
- U.S. National Register of Historic Places
- U.S. Historic district – Contributing property
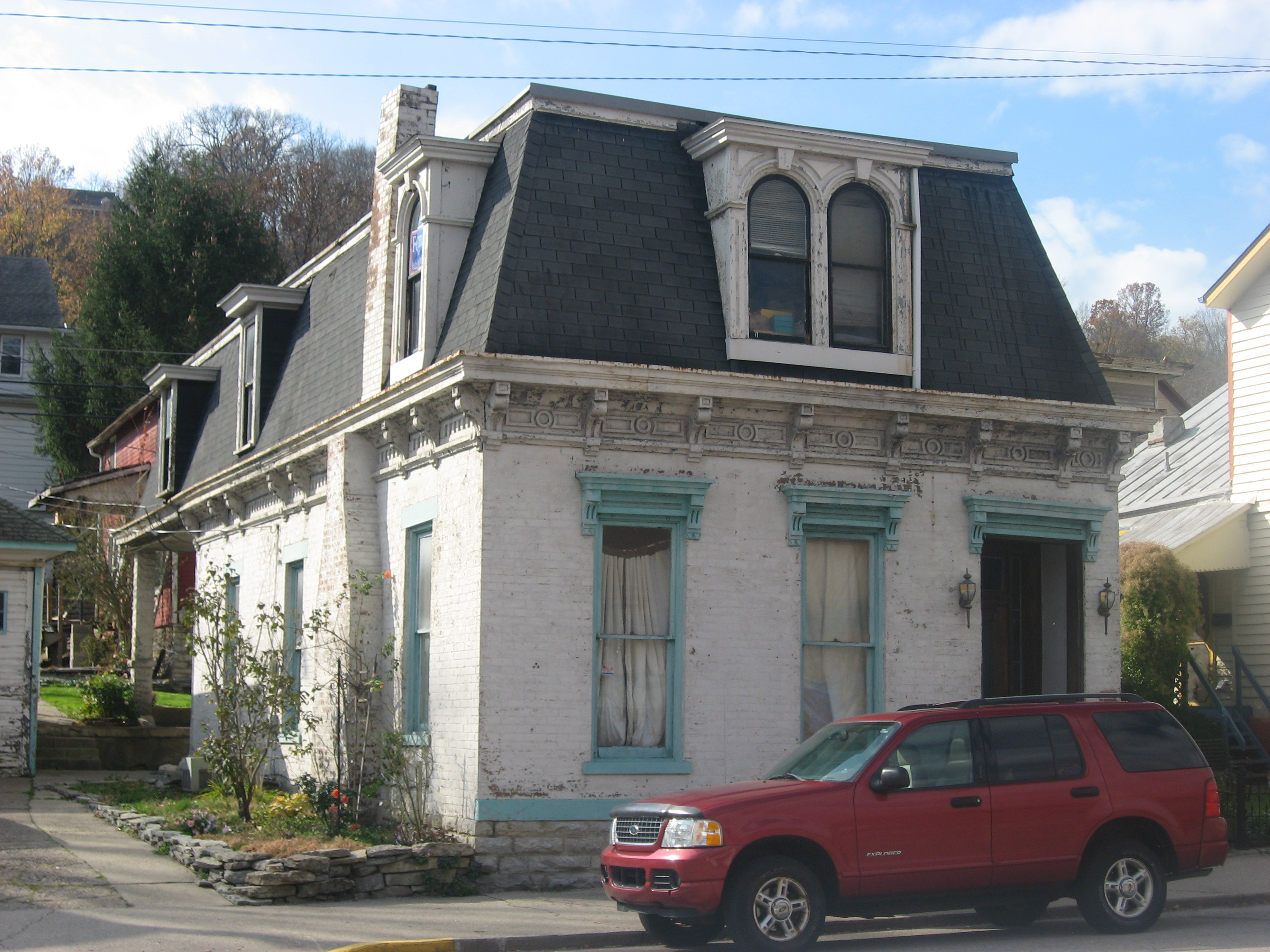
- George Sutton Medical Office, November 2012

- Location within Indiana Location within the United States
- Location: 315 Third St., Aurora, Indiana
- Coordinates: 39°3′19″N 84°54′6″W
- Area: less than one acre
- Built: c. 1870
- Architectural style: Second Empire
- NRHP reference No.: 94001118
- Added to NRHP: September 8, 1994

Dr. George Sutton Medical Office Building is a historic medical office building located at Aurora, Indiana. It was built about 1870, and is a small two-story, Second Empire style brick building. It sits on a limestone block foundation and has a mansard roof.

It was added to the National Register of Historic Places in 1994. It is located in the Downtown Aurora Historic District.
