= Aurora City Hall =

- U.S. National Register of Historic Places
- U.S. Historic district – Contributing property
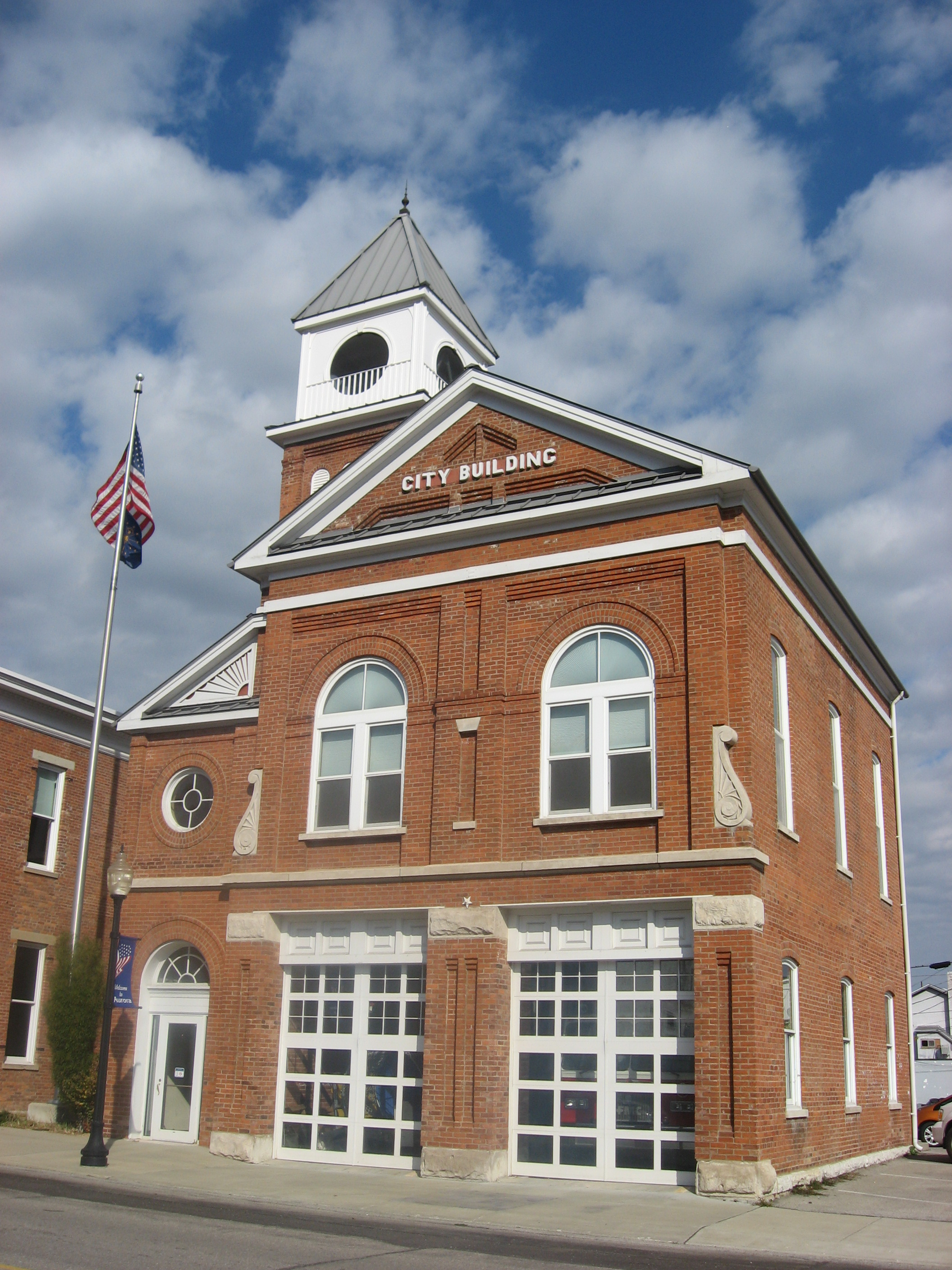

- Location within Indiana Location within the United States
- Interactive map showing the location for Aurora City Hall
- Location: 216 Third St. and 233-237 Main St., Aurora, Indiana
- Coordinates: 39°3′19″N 84°54′0″W
- Area: less than one acre
- Built: 1870, 1887
- Architect: McDonald Bros.; Louis Kreite
- Architectural style: Italianate, Romanesque
- NRHP reference No.: 96000288
- Added to NRHP: March 14, 1996

Aurora City Hall is a historic city hall located at Aurora, Indiana. It was built in two sections in 1870 and 1887. The older section is a two-story, Italianate style brick and stone building purchased in 1882 to house the fire department. The 1887 section was built to house the city hall and is a two-story, Romanesque Revival style brick and stone building with a gable front. The buildings were connected about 1970.

It was added to the National Register of Historic Places in 1996. It is located in the Downtown Aurora Historic District.
