= Hamline Chapel United Methodist Church =

Historic church in Indiana, United States

- Hamline Chapel, United Methodist Church
- U.S. National Register of Historic Places
- U.S. Historic district – Contributing property
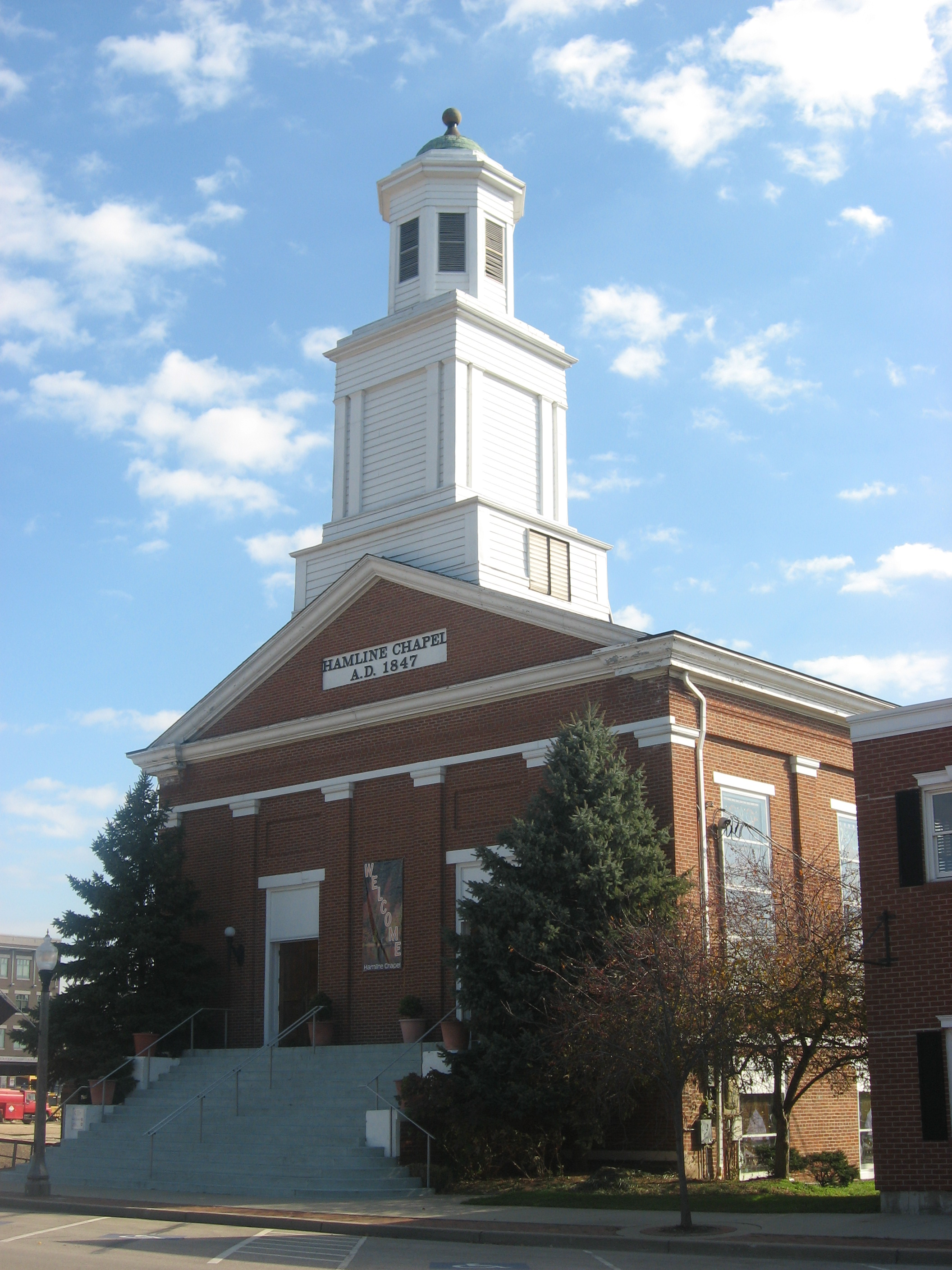

- Location within Indiana Location within the United States
- Location: High and Vine Sts., Lawrenceburg, Indiana
- Coordinates: 39°5′29″N 84°50′51″W
- Area: 0.3 acres (0.12 ha)
- Built: 1847
- Architectural style: Greek Revival
- NRHP reference No.: 82000030
- Added to NRHP: September 9, 1982

Hamline Chapel, United Methodist Church is a historic Methodist church located at High and Vine Streets in Lawrenceburg, Indiana. It was built about 1847, and is a one-story, gable front, Greek Revival style brick building on a raised basement. A rear addition was built about 1900 and two-story Sunday School and office addition in the 1950s. The church was renovated in 1979.

It was added to the National Register of Historic Places in 1982. It is located in the Downtown Lawrenceburg Historic District.
