= Leive, Parks and Stapp Opera House =

- U.S. National Register of Historic Places
- U.S. Historic district – Contributing property
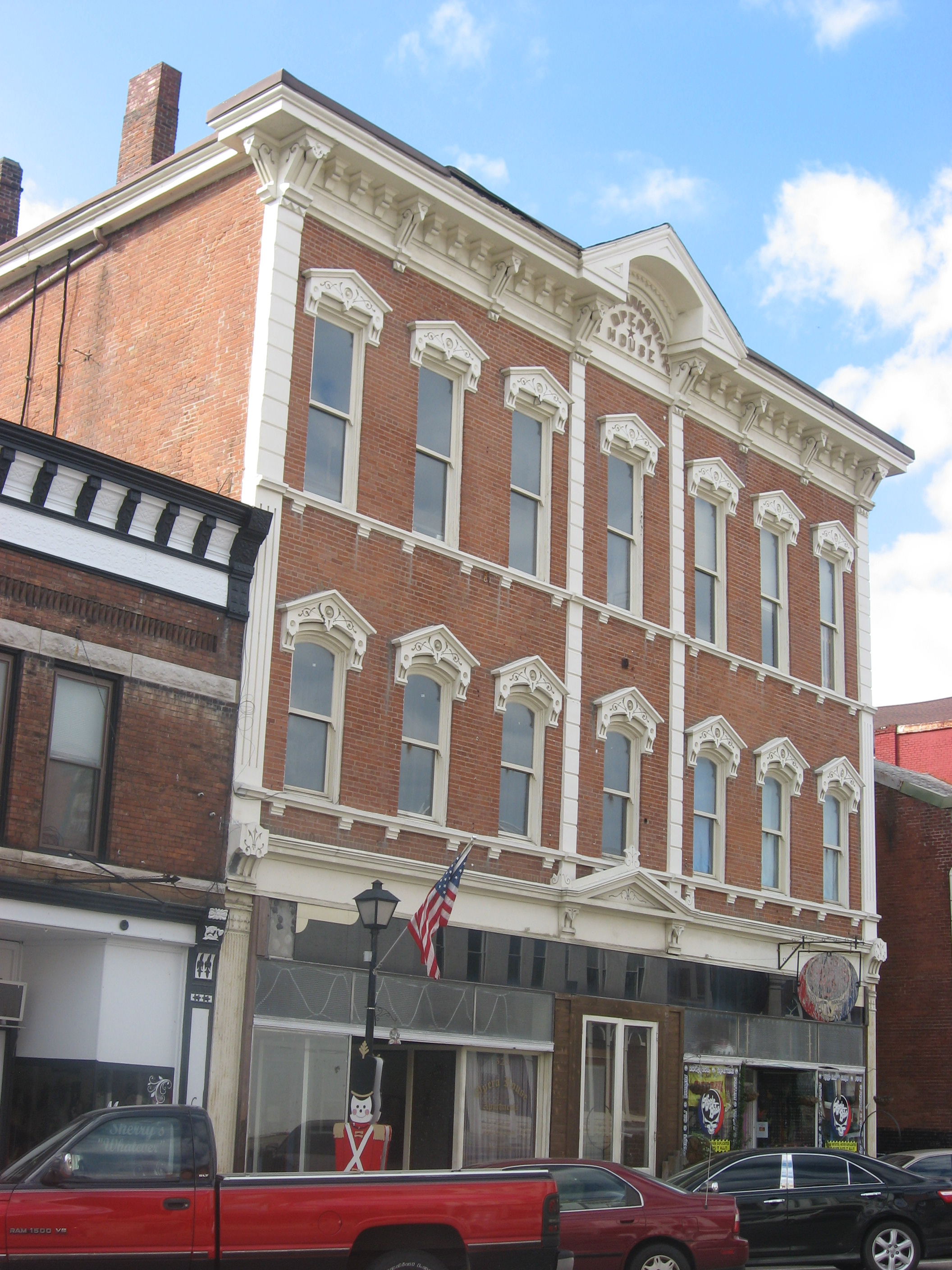
- Leive, Parks and Stapp Opera House, November 2012

- Location within Indiana Location within the United States
- Location: 321-325 Second St., Aurora, Indiana
- Coordinates: 39°3′23″N 84°54′4″W
- Area: less than one acre
- Built: 1878
- Architect: Lindsay, Thomas
- Architectural style: Italianate
- NRHP reference No.: 94001120
- Added to NRHP: September 20, 1994

Leive, Parks and Stapp Opera House, also known as the Grand Opera House, is a historic opera house located at Aurora, Indiana. It was built in 1878, and is a three-story, Italianate style brick building. It measures 53 feet wide and 104 feet deep. The front facade features a cast iron storefront with pilasters with Corinthian order capitals.

It was added to the National Register of Historic Places in 1994. It is located in the Downtown Aurora Historic District.
