= First Methodist Church (Aurora, Indiana) =

Church in Aurora, Indiana

- Aurora First United Methodist Church
- U.S. National Register of Historic Places
- U.S. Historic district – Contributing property
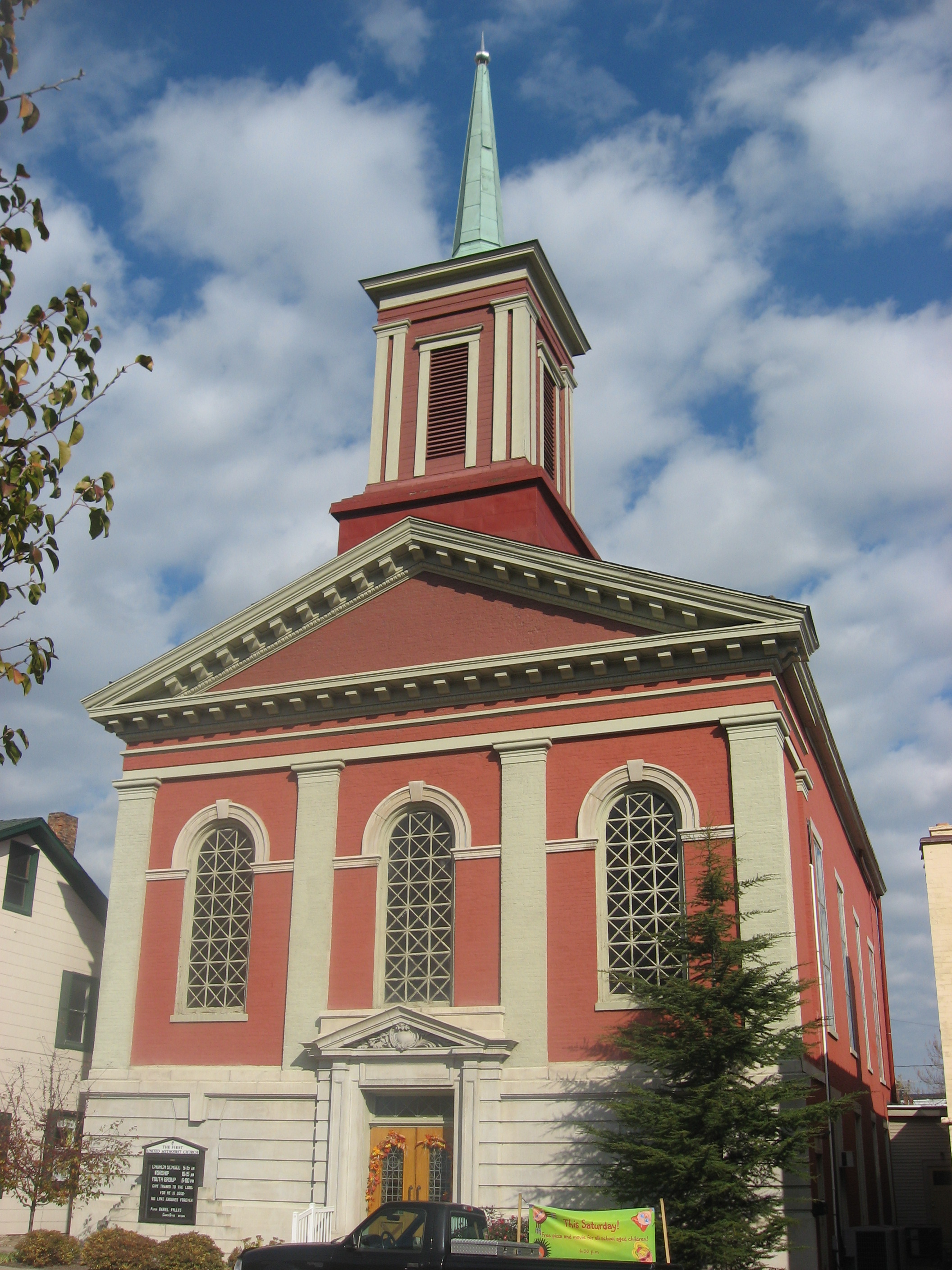

- Location within Indiana Location within the United States
- Location: 304 Third St., Aurora, Indiana
- Coordinates: 39°3′20″N 84°54′3″W
- Area: less than one acre
- Built: 1816
- Built by: Allen, William
- Architectural style: Greek Revival
- NRHP reference No.: 94001113
- Added to NRHP: September 8, 1994

Aurora First United Methodist Church, also known as the First United Methodist Church of Aurora and Aurora Methodist Episcopal Church, is a historic Methodist church located at 304 Third Street in Aurora, Indiana. It was built in 1816, and is a two-story, gable front, Greek Revival style brick building. It measures 45 feet, 6 inches, wide and 95 feet deep. A limestone front was added to the original building in 1903 and one-story rear addition built between 1885 and 1888. The church was remodeled in 1954.

It was added to the National Register of Historic Places in 1994. It is located in the Downtown Aurora Historic District.
