= First Presbyterian Church (Aurora, Indiana) =

Historic church in Indiana, United States

- U.S. National Register of Historic Places
- U.S. Historic district – Contributing property
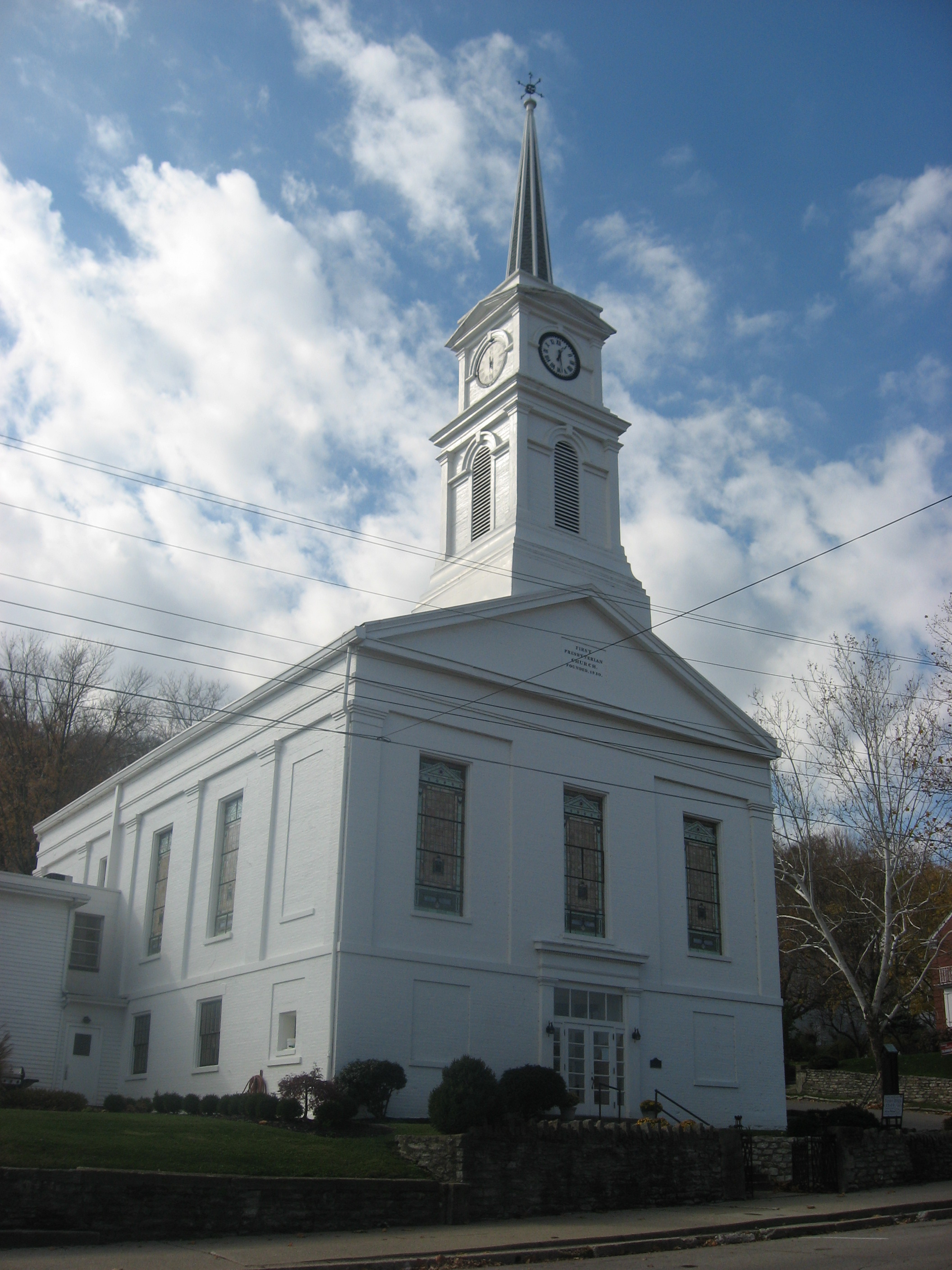
- Front of the church

- Location within Indiana Location within the United States
- Location: 215 Fourth St., Aurora, Indiana
- Coordinates: 39°3′15″N 84°53′52″W
- Area: less than one acre
- Built: 1855
- Architect: Hamilton, John
- Architectural style: Greek Revival
- NRHP reference No.: 94001116
- Added to NRHP: September 08, 1994

The First Presbyterian Church of Aurora, Indiana is a historic Presbyterian congregation and church located at Aurora, Indiana. The original building completed in 1855 is still used, and is believed to have been designed by architect John R. Hamilton. It is a two-story, rectangular, Greek Revival style red brick building painted white. It measure approximately 45 feet wide by 75 feet deep and rests on a rough cut limestone foundation. It features a steeply tower consisting of a base, belfry, clock, and steeple.

It was listed on the National Register of Historic Places in 1994. It is located in the Downtown Aurora Historic District.

According to the church's website "a committee of the Presbytery of Madison organized the 'First Presbyterian Church of Aurora, Indiana' in 1844" with members of the Hancock, Gaff, Cannon, Kennedy, Lotham, McConnell, and Witherow families and Rev. W.A. Smith as the first installed pastor.

The church's website states that land was purchased in 1848 and the first phase of construction was completed by 1850 "when the congregation began to meet in what is now the basement of the church". Second phase construction was completed in 1855. This included the "Greek Revival" sanctuary and bell-tower and "a four-faced" public clock which was "the official time-piece of the City of Aurora until 1981 when it was formally donated to the Congregation by the city council". The church is said to have had the first pipe organ in Dearborn County, installed in the church in 1860 after "a boat transporting the instrument was wrecked at Aurora and the congregation purchased it as 'salvage'." "The pipes were made of wood, and the bellows were pumped by hand."

The congregation is currently in a "yoked" relationship with Hopewell Presbyterian Church of Dillsboro, Indiana, meaning that the pastor of First Presbyterian also serves as the pastor of Hopewell and that certain administrative and mission functions of both congregations work in close harmony with one another.
