= Daniel S. Major House =

Historic house in Indiana, United States

- U.S. National Register of Historic Places
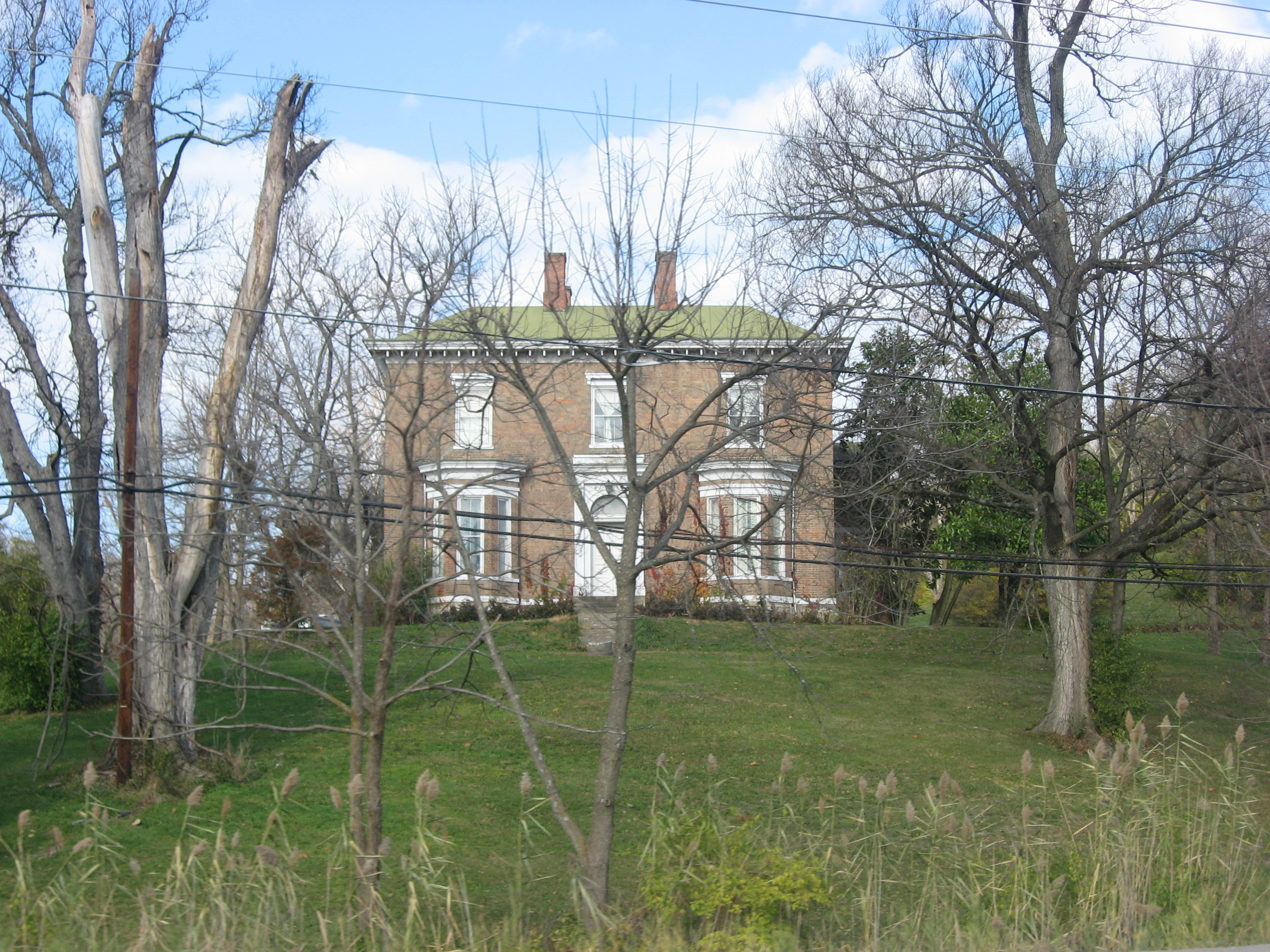
- Daniel S. Major House, November 2012

- Location within Indiana Location within the United States
- Location: 761 W. Eads Pkwy., Lawrenceburg, Indiana
- Coordinates: 39°5′21″N 84°52′35″W
- Area: 2.5 acres (1.0 ha)
- Built: 1857-1860
- Architect: Hamilton & Rankin
- Architectural style: Italianate
- NRHP reference No.: 03001320
- Added to NRHP: December 23, 2003

Daniel S. Major House is a historic home located at Lawrenceburg, Indiana. It was built between 1857 and 1860, and is a two-story, rectangular, Italianate style brick dwelling. It has an ashlar stone foundation, low hipped roof, polygonal bay windows, and a two-story service wing.

It was added to the National Register of Historic Places in 2003.
