= Vance-Tousey House =

Historic house in Indiana, United States

- U.S. National Register of Historic Places
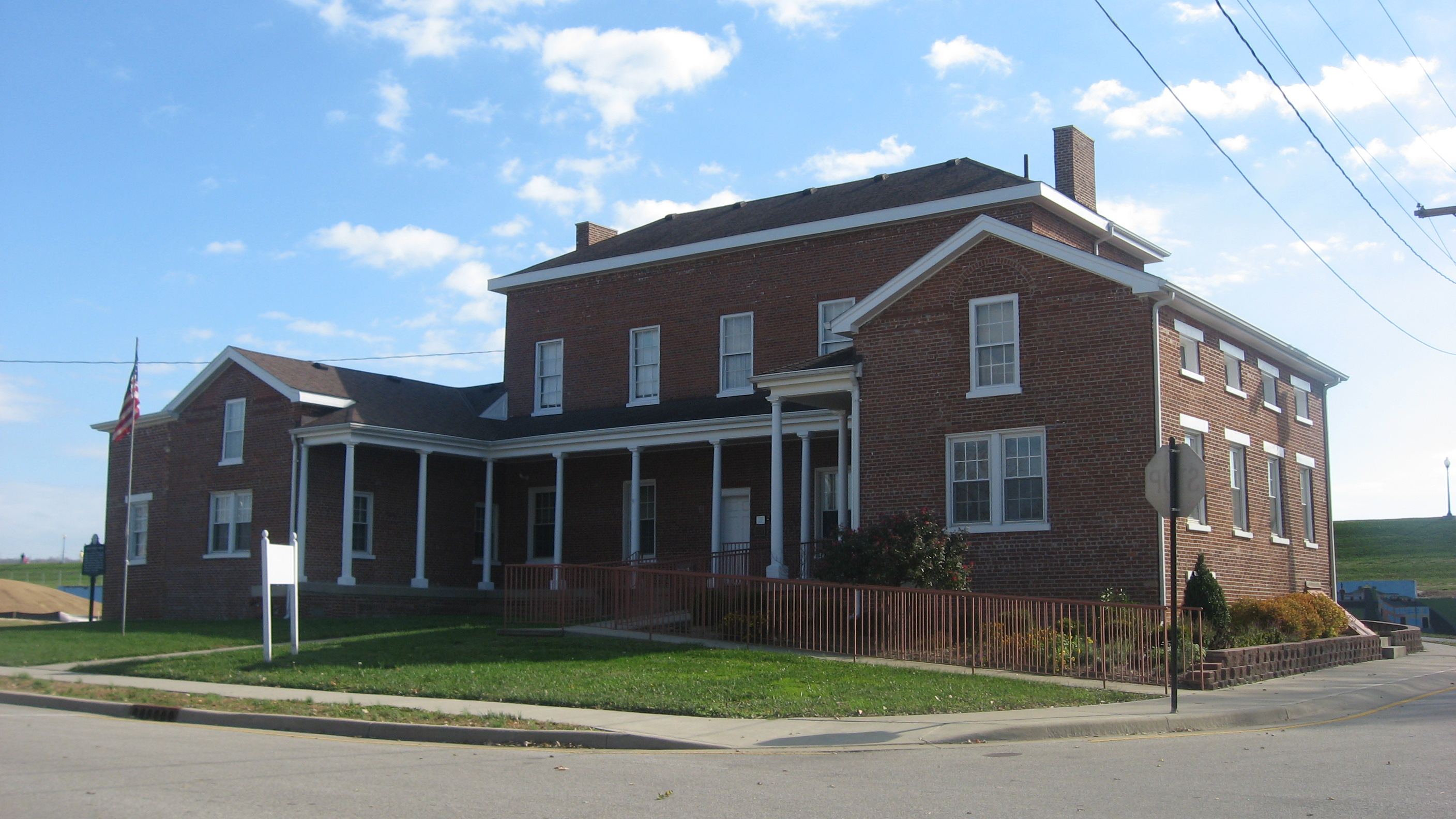
- Vance-Tousey House, November 2012

- Location within Indiana Location within the United States
- Location: 508 W. High St., Lawrenceburg, Indiana
- Coordinates: 39°5′19″N 84°51′7″W
- Area: less than one acre
- Built: 1818
- Architectural style: Georgian, Federal
- NRHP reference No.: 00001547
- Added to NRHP: December 28, 2000

Vance-Tousey House is a historic home located at Lawrenceburg, Indiana. It was built about 1818, and is a two-story, five-bay, Late Georgian / Federal style brick and sandstone dwelling with a low hipped roof. The main block is flanked by 1 1/2-story wings. Flanking the main entrance are fluted Doric order engaged columns above which is a Palladian window. It was built by Samuel C. Vance, founder of the town of Lawrenceburg. It houses the Dearborn County Historical Society.

It was added to the National Register of Historic Places in 2000.
