= Dearborn County Courthouse =

- U.S. National Register of Historic Places
- U.S. Historic district – Contributing property
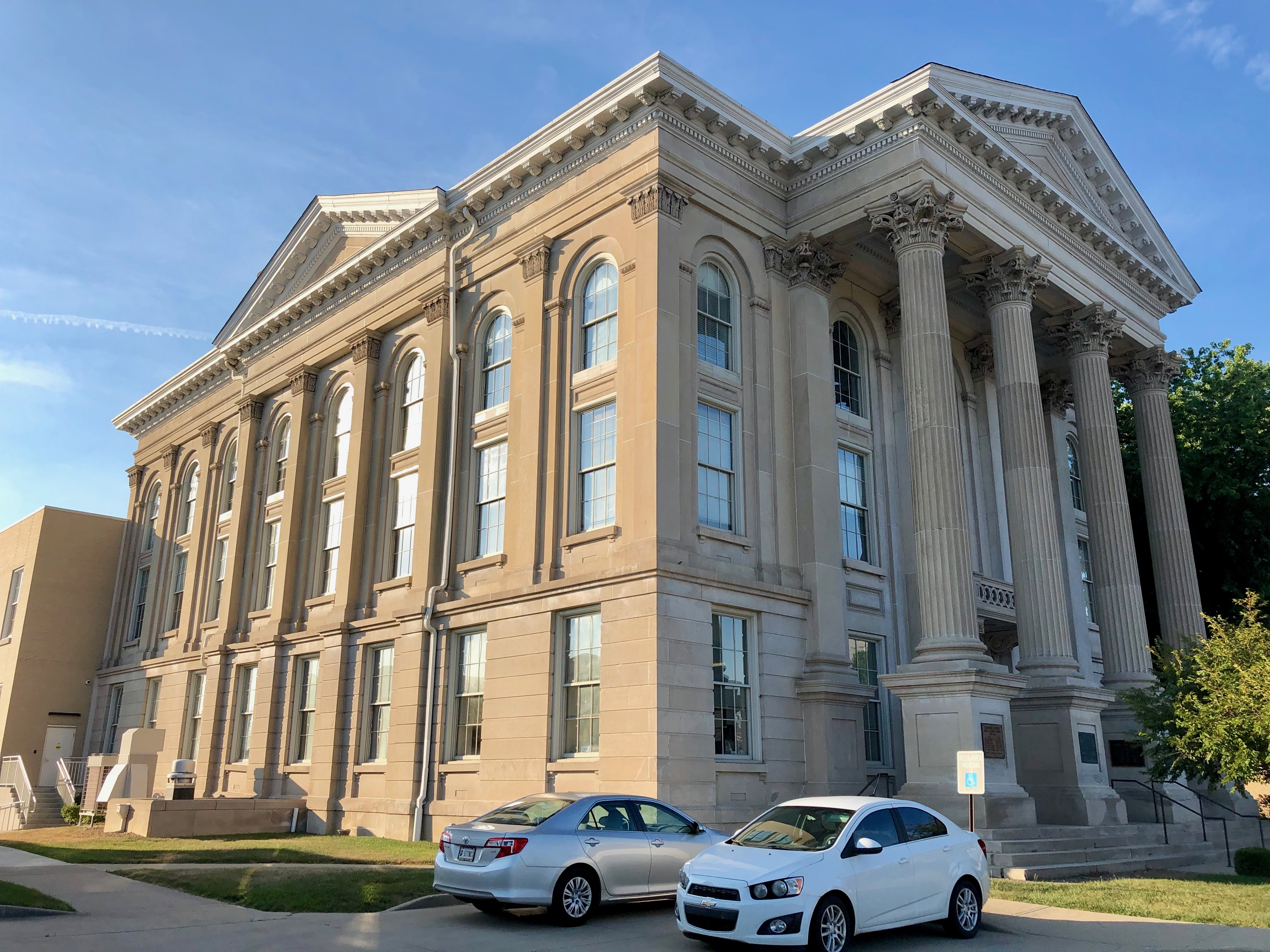
- Dearborn County Courthouse, July 2019

- Location within Indiana Location within the United States
- Interactive map showing the location for Dearborn County Courthouse
- Location: High and Mary Sts., Lawrenceburg, Indiana
- Coordinates: 39°5′28″N 84°50′59″W
- Area: 1 acre (0.40 ha)
- Built: 1870-1871
- Architect: Kyle, George
- Architectural style: Greek Revival
- NRHP reference No.: 81000008
- Added to NRHP: April 9, 1981

Dearborn County Courthouse is a historic courthouse located at Lawrenceburg, Indiana. It was built in 1870–71, and is a three-story, five-bay, Greek Revival style building constructed of limestone. It features a three-bay pedimented portico with four fluted columns with Corinthian order capitals.

It was added to the National Register of Historic Places in 1981. It is located in the Downtown Lawrenceburg Historic District.
