= Aurora Public Library (Indiana) =

- U.S. National Register of Historic Places
- U.S. Historic district – Contributing property
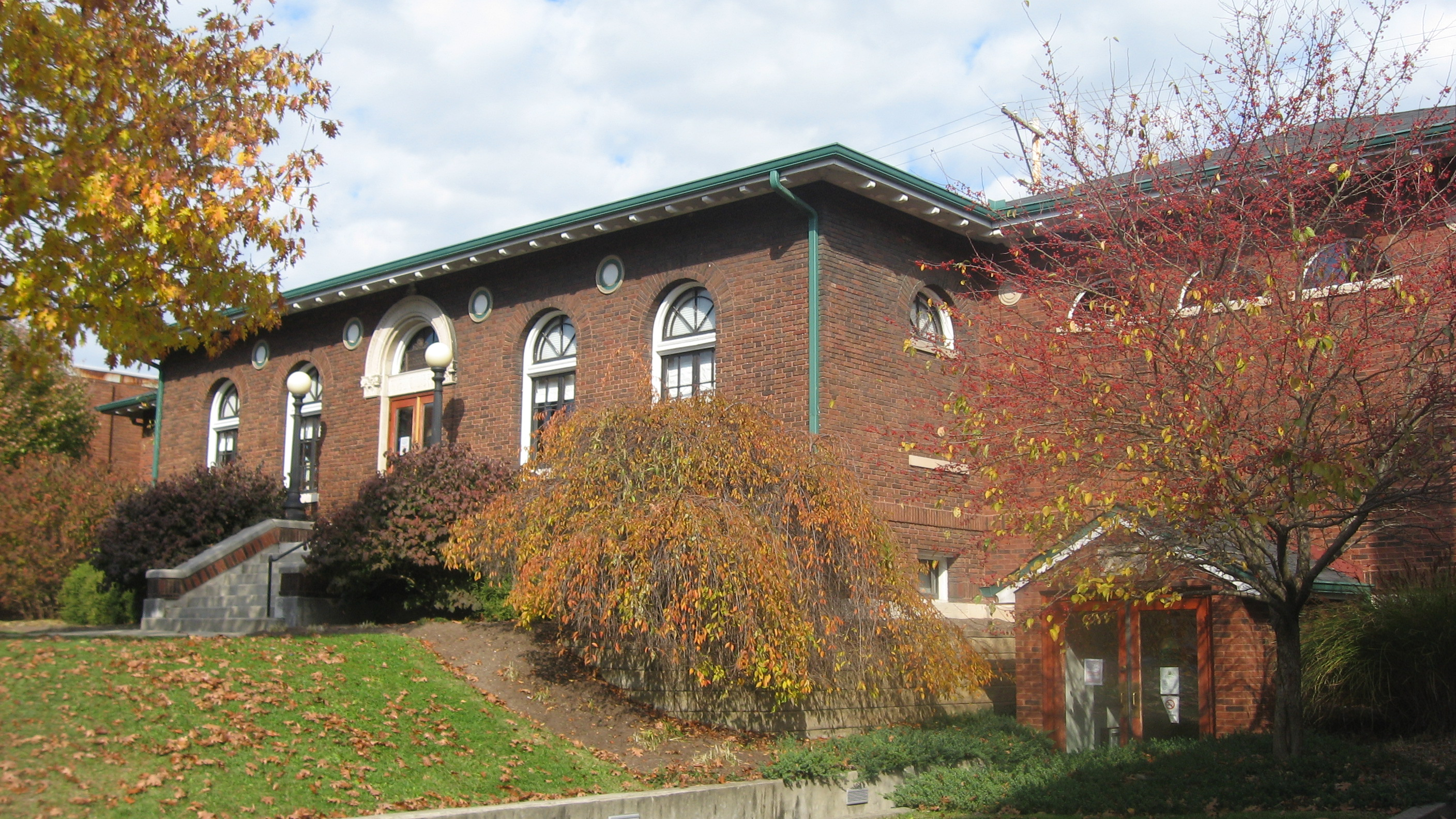
- Front of the library

- Location within Indiana Location within the United States
- Location: 414 Second St., Aurora, Indiana
- Coordinates: 39°3′25″N 84°54′5″W
- Area: less than one acre
- Built: 1913-1914, 1923
- Architect: Garber, Frederick & Woodward; et al.
- Architectural style: Renaissance
- NRHP reference No.: 93000474
- Added to NRHP: May 27, 1993

The Aurora Public Library was first organized by voluntary contributions. When the town was incorporated in 1819 a lot on Fifth Street (then called Literary Street) was set aside for a public library, but it took time for enough funds to be raised for its establishment.

In 1882 fundraising by the sale of stock in the library property was done in $5 per share for 141 shares, subscribed by 51 people, and the sale of the library lot for another $700 raising $1,405. Non-shareholders could access the library for $1.50 a year.

In 1901 the library with its 3,500 volumes and "several current magazines" was transferred to the city, and opened in two "well lighted rooms" in the city building three afternoons and two evenings per week with an annual circulation totaling 11,000. It was funded with a 3 cent tax per $100 in property value ($370 per year) supplemented by donations of books and money. A 1904 account stated that under its board selected by the city council "Aurora now has a good, free, public library operating under a very favorable law and there is no reason why, fostered as it is, it should not fulfill the expectations of the liberal minded founders of the city who planned for a community where culture would be general and where ignorance should have no place."

The current Aurora Library building was constructed by the Cincinnati architectural firm of Garber & Woodward in 1913–1914, with a small rear addition designed by the same firm and added in 1923. It is a one-story, "T" plan, Renaissance Revival style red brick building on a raised basement. It has a low hipped roof, round arched openings, and terra cotta ornament.

It was listed on the National Register of Historic Places in 1993. It is located in the Downtown Aurora Historic District.

The Aurora Public Library operates today as the Aurora Public Library District. The Aurora Public Library also serves residents of several surrounding townships and of the nearby city of Lawrenceburg through a reciprocity agreement.
