= Aurora, Indiana =

- City
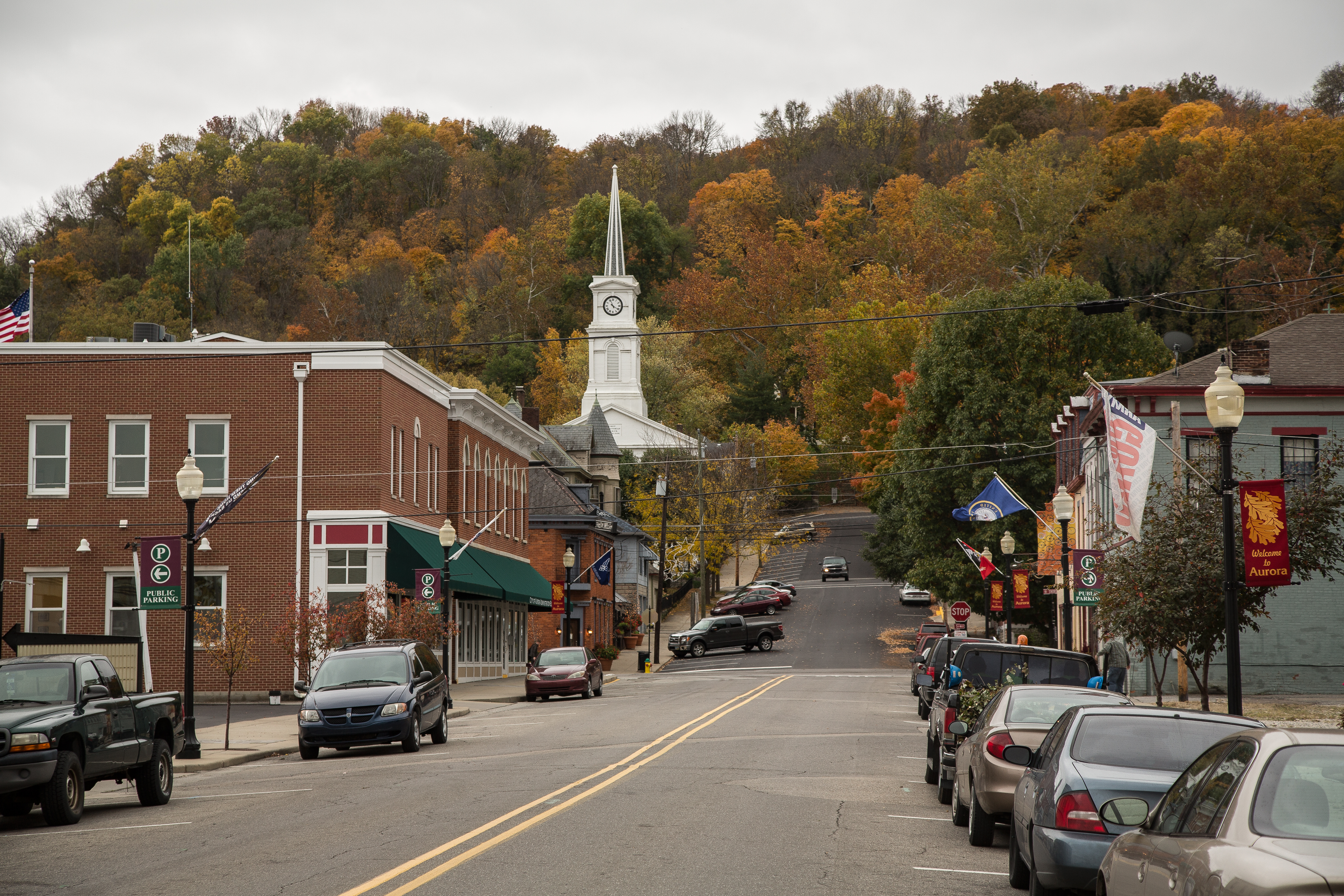

- Nickname: City of Spires
- Location of Aurora in Dearborn County, Indiana.
- Coordinates: 39°04′12″N 84°53′43″W
- Country: United States
- State: Indiana
- County: Dearborn
- Townships: Center, Lawrenceburg, Washington
- Platted: 1819
- Incorporated (town): 1822
- Incorporated (city): c. 1845

Government
  - Mayor: Patrick Schwing (R)

Area
  - Total: 3.54 sq mi (9.16 km^{2})
  - Land: 3.29 sq mi (8.53 km^{2})
  - Water: 0.24 sq mi (0.63 km^{2})
- Elevation: 515 ft (157 m)

Population (2020)
  - Total: 3,479
  - Density: 1,056.8/sq mi (408.05/km^{2})
- Time zone: UTC-5 (EST)
  - Summer (DST): UTC-4 (EDT)
- ZIP code: 47001
- Area code: 812
- FIPS code: 18-02782
- GNIS ID: 2394030
- Website: www.aurora.in.us

Aurora is a city in Dearborn County, Indiana, United States. The population was 3,479 at the 2020 census.

== Geography ==
According to the 2010 census, Aurora has a total area of 3.087 square miles (8.00 km^{2}), of which 2.76 square miles (7.15 km^{2}) (or 89.41%) is land and 0.327 square miles (0.85 km^{2}) (or 10.59%) is water.

== History ==
Aurora was platted in 1819. It was named for Aurora, the goddess of dawn in Roman mythology. Aurora was incorporated as a town in 1822 and became a city in 1848, though some sources say 1845.

Aurora is known for its historic downtown area and the ornate Hillforest mansion built for Thomas Gaff who earned his fortune shipping goods on the Ohio River by steamboat. The mansion was designed by architect Isaiah Rogers and was completed in 1855 in the Italian Renaissance style. The design is symmetrical. Details include deep overhangs, arched windows and balconies and porches. Hillforest was declared a National Historic Landmark in 1992.

Aurora was once a sundown town, a place unwelcoming to non-whites after dark. The Aurora Journal reported on September 9, 1937, a reader's concern about a sign posted along the river that read, "Don't Let the Sun Set on You in Aurora" with the inclusion of a common racial slur for a Black person. The article concluded, "The sign has been down for some time, but the idea still holds good."

In addition to Hillforest, the Aurora City Hall, Aurora Methodist Episcopal Church, Aurora Public Library, Downtown Aurora Historic District, First Evangelical United Church of Christ, First Presbyterian Church, George Street Bridge, Lewis Hurlbert, Sr. House, Leive, Parks and Stapp Opera House, Levi Stevens House, and George Sutton Medical Office are listed on the National Register of Historic Places.

== Demographics ==
Historical population
Census	Pop.	Note	%±
1850	1,954		—
1860	2,990		53.0%
1870	3,304		10.5%
1880	4,435		34.2%
1890	3,929		−11.4%
1900	3,645		−7.2%
1910	4,410		21.0%
1920	4,299		−2.5%
1930	4,386		2.0%
1940	4,828		10.1%
1950	4,780		−1.0%
1960	4,119		−13.8%
1970	4,293		4.2%
1980	3,816		−11.1%
1990	3,825		0.2%
2000	3,965		3.7%
2010	3,750		−5.4%
2020	3,479		−7.2%
U.S. Decennial Census

=== 2020 census ===
As of the 2020 census, Aurora had a population of 3,479. The median age was 38.7 years. 23.1% of residents were under the age of 18 and 15.8% of residents were 65 years of age or older. For every 100 females there were 99.9 males, and for every 100 females age 18 and over there were 100.1 males age 18 and over.

99.7% of residents lived in urban areas, while 0.3% lived in rural areas.

There were 1,433 households in Aurora, of which 29.4% had children under the age of 18 living in them. Of all households, 36.1% were married-couple households, 22.9% were households with a male householder and no spouse or partner present, and 28.7% were households with a female householder and no spouse or partner present. About 32.2% of all households were made up of individuals and 13.7% had someone living alone who was 65 years of age or older.

There were 1,619 housing units, of which 11.5% were vacant. The homeowner vacancy rate was 2.0% and the rental vacancy rate was 7.3%.

Racial composition as of the 2020 census
Race	Number	Percent
White	3,211	92.3%
Black or African American	37	1.1%
American Indian and Alaska Native	8	0.2%
Asian	6	0.2%
Native Hawaiian and Other Pacific Islander	1	0.0%
Some other race	24	0.7%
Two or more races	192	5.5%
Hispanic or Latino (of any race)	84	2.4%

=== 2010 census ===
As of the 2010 census, there were 3,750 people, 1,472 households, and 936 families living in the city. The population density was 1,358.7 inhabitants per square mile (524.6/km^{2}). There were 1,647 housing units at an average density of 596.7 per square mile (230.4/km^{2}). The racial makeup of the city was 97.5% White, 0.5% African American, 0.3% Native American, 0.3% Asian, 0.5% from other races, and 0.7% from two or more races. Hispanic or Latino of any race were 1.5% of the population.

There were 1,472 households, of which 35.1% had children under the age of 18 living with them, 42.3% were married couples living together, 15.1% had a female householder with no husband present, 6.1% had a male householder with no wife present, and 36.4% were non-families. 29.1% of all households were made up of individuals, and 11.6% had someone living alone who was 65 years of age or older. The average household size was 2.55 and the average family size was 3.11.

The median age in the city was 36.2 years. 26.6% of residents were under the age of 18; 8.7% were between the ages of 18 and 24; 26.5% were from 25 to 44; 25.3% were from 45 to 64; and 12.9% were 65 years of age or older. The gender makeup of the city was 49.3% male and 50.7% female.

=== 2000 census ===
As of the 2000 census, there were 3,965 people, 1,592 households, and 1,022 families living in the city. The population density was 1,428.2 inhabitants per square mile (551.4/km^{2}). There were 1,716 housing units at an average density of 618.1 per square mile (238.6/km^{2}). The racial makeup of the city was 98.59% White, 0.10% African American, 0.33% Native American, 0.15% Asian, 0.25% from other races, and 0.58% from two or more races. Hispanic or Latino of any race were 0.61% of the population.

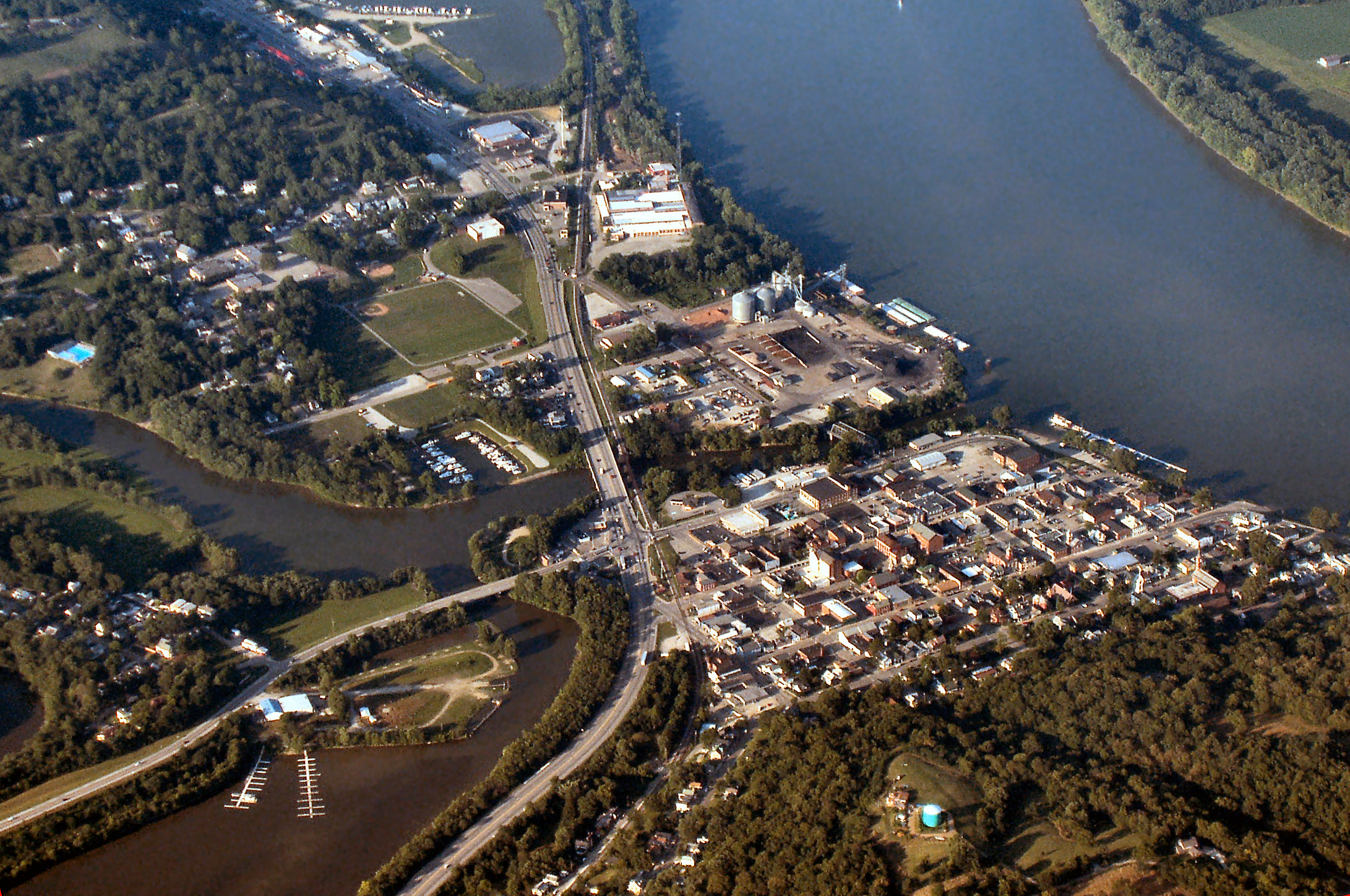
Aurora from the air, looking northeast.

There were 1,592 households, out of which 31.8% had children under the age of 18 living with them, 47.4% were married couples living together, 12.2% had a female householder with no husband present, and 35.8% were non-families. 29.7% of all households were made up of individuals, and 11.7% had someone living alone who was 65 years of age or older. The average household size was 2.48 and the average family size was 3.08.

In the city, the population was spread out, with 26.9% under the age of 18, 9.1% from 18 to 24, 30.7% from 25 to 44, 20.3% from 45 to 64, and 13.1% who were 65 years of age or older. The median age was 35 years. For every 100 females, there were 96.2 males. For every 100 females age 18 and over, there were 91.8 males.

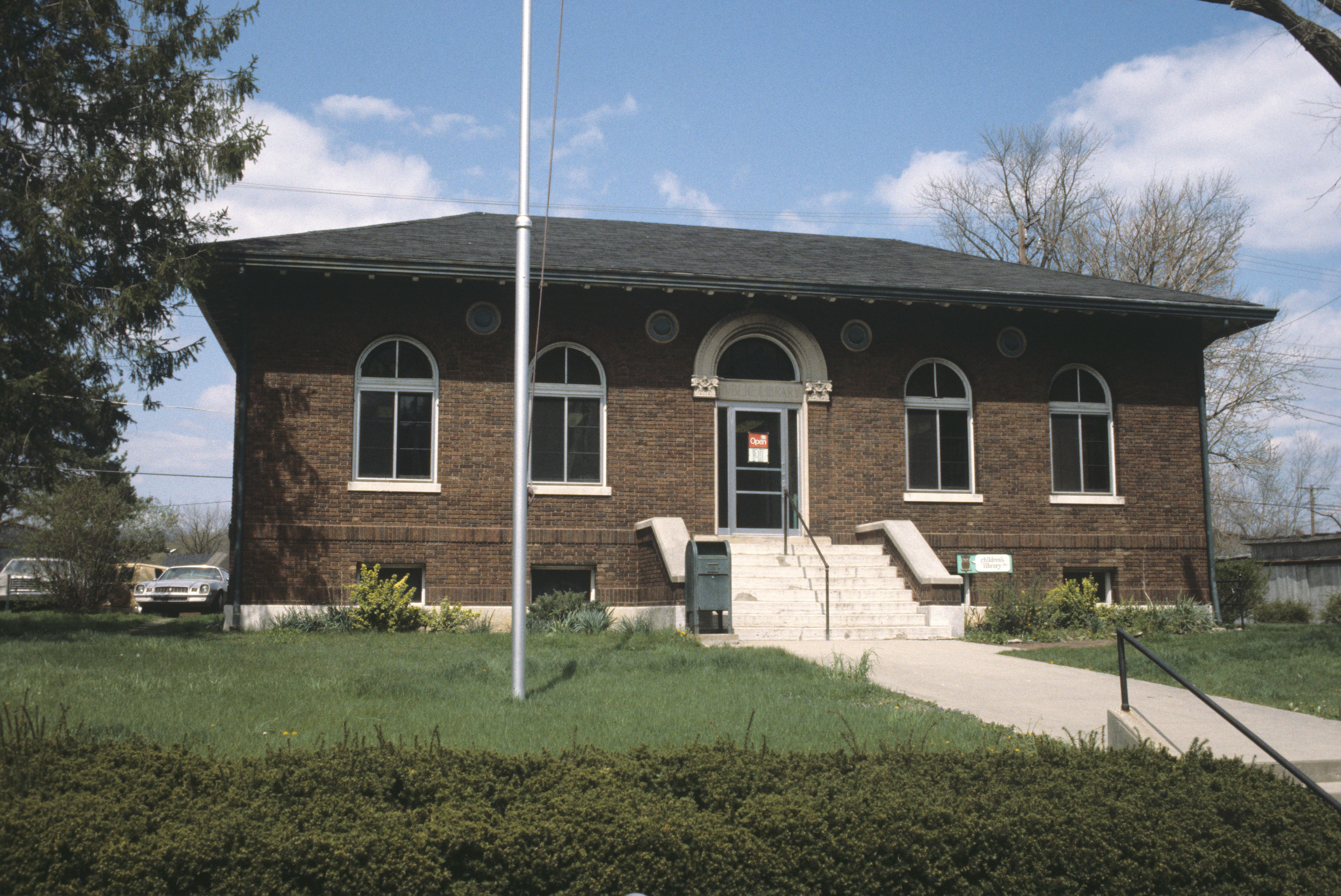
Aurora Public Library, 414 Second Street (Aurora, Ind.)

The median income for a household in the city was $32,500, and the median income for a family was $39,331. Males had a median income of $32,058 versus $24,671 for females. The per capita income for the city was $16,587. About 9.4% of families and 10.4% of the population were below the poverty line, including 11.3% of those under age 18 and 12.3% of those age 65 or over.

== Government ==
The government consists of a mayor and a city council. The mayor is elected in citywide vote. The city council consists of five members. Four are elected from individual districts. One is elected at-large.

=== Current elected officials ===
- Mayor: Patrick Schwing
- Clerk Treasurer: Benny Turner
- Council District 1: Sherry Love
- Council District 2: Jonne Messer
- Council District 3: Terry Hahn
- Council District 4: Pam Hartford
- Council At Large: Michelle Jarvis

== Education ==
The town has a free lending library, the Aurora Public Library District.

== Newspapers ==
- The Peoples' Advocate (1868–1870)
- The Aurora Journal (1859–1952)

== Notable people ==
- Kirtley Baker (1869–1927) – Major League Baseball player.
- Stephen Bechtel Sr. (1900–1989) – former president of Bechtel Corporation
- Elmer Davis (1890–1958) – Director of the Office of War Information in World War II; Peabody Award recipient.
- Elias Selah Holliday (1842–1936) – served 4 terms in the United States House of Representatives.
- Jesse Lynch Holman (1774–1842) – helped plat the town of Aurora in 1819. Appointed by President Andrew Jackson to the U.S. District Court for the District of Indiana.
- William S. Holman (1822–1897) – born in Aurora at Veraestau, the home built by his father, Jesse Lynch Holman. He was elected to 10 terms in the United States House of Representatives.
- Lonnie Mack (1941–2016) – influential rock guitar soloing pioneer, was born and raised in the area, and is buried in Aurora.
- Anna Meyer (Born 1928) – at age 15, one of the youngest players to sign a contract with the All-American Girls Professional Baseball League.
- Harry Emerson Rowbottom (1884–1934) – served 3 terms in the United States House of Representatives from Indiana's 1st congressional district.
- John Q. Tufts (1840–1902) – born in Aurora in 1840, his family moved to Iowa in 1852. He was elected as a Republican to represent Iowa's 2nd congressional district in the United States House of Representatives.

== See also ==
- List of cities and towns along the Ohio River
- List of sundown towns in the United States
- Lochry's Defeat
