= Central Railroad of Indiana =

Class III railroad

Central Railroad Company of Indiana

Overview
- Headquarters: Cincinnati, Ohio, U.S.
- Reporting mark: CIND
- Locale: Indiana, Ohio, U.S.
- Dates of operation: 1992–present

Technical
- Track gauge: 4 ft 8 1/2 in (1,435 mm) standard gauge
- Length: 83 miles (134 km)

Other
- Website: https://www.gwrr.com/cind/

The Central Railroad Company of Indiana (reporting mark CIND) is a Class III short-line railroad that owns 83 miles (134 km) of track between Cincinnati, Ohio, and Shelbyville, Indiana, with trackage rights on CSX to Indianapolis, Indiana. CIND interchanges with CSX, Indiana & Ohio Railway, and Norfolk Southern in Cincinnati, and in North Bend, Ohio, with CSX; an Indiana & Ohio branchline splits from the CIND line at Valley Junction, a railroad location near Hooven, Ohio.

The line is owned and operated by Genesee & Wyoming. It was originally part of the Big Four Railroad, a long-time property of the New York Central Railroad, and was sold by Conrail in 1992. The CIND and its sister railroad, the Central Railroad of Indianapolis, were acquired by RailTex's Indiana & Ohio Railway in 1998, which became a RailAmerica holding in 2000; Genesee & Wyoming acquired RailAmerica in 2012.

The majority of the railroad's traffic comes from finished Honda automobiles, produced by Honda Manufacturing of Indiana near Greensburg, Indiana, but grain, chemical products, steel, and other miscellaneous freight are also handled between Greensburg and Cincinnati; the Greensburg-Shelbyville portion has been out of service since 2006. The CIND hauled around 8,500 carloads in 2008, and can handle freight cars weighing up to 286,000 pounds (143 short tons/129.7 tonnes).

== History ==
The earliest predecessor of the Central of Indiana is the Lawrenceburg & Indianapolis, chartered in 1832 to connect those cities by way of Greensburg and Shelbyville. One and a quarter miles (2.01 km) of wooden rails were laid by July 1834, making this horse powered track the first railroad in Indiana. No further construction occurred until the Rushville & Lawrenceburg, chartered in 1848, and begun in 1849, at Lawrenceburg, Indiana, reached Shelbyville, Indiana, in 1850. The road was renamed the Lawrenceburg & Upper Mississippi that year, and was completed to Indianapolis, in 1853, changing its name again to the Indianapolis & Cincinnati (I&C). On November 1, 1853, the first train ran from Indianapolis to Lawrenceburg, and to Cincinnati by steamer on the Ohio River.

The similarly named Cincinnati & Indiana Railroad (C&I) was chartered that same year, for a line between Cincinnati and the Indiana state line near Harrison, Ohio. This line, as well as a connection to the I&C via Valley Junction, was complete by 1863, and Henry C. Lord, the force behind the C&I's construction, became president of both companies. After acquiring the Lafayette & Indianapolis Railroad (L&I) in 1867, Lord changed the name of the combined L&I-I&C system to the Indianapolis, Cincinnati, & Lafayette (IC&L) on February 14, 1867; the C&I remained leased to the larger parent company. Further expansion put the company deeper into debt, and after a legal battle between Lord and the IC&L's shareholders, the railroad was declared bankrupt in 1870, and Lord was ousted as president. Melville Ingalls was appointed as a receiver of the company, and became its president when it was taken out of receivership in 1873.

Ingalls made several improvements to the line, including construction of a bypass around Lawrenceburg, in 1875. The bypass eliminated 6 miles (9.7 km) of circuitous railroad, and is the route trains take today, the original lines to Lawrenceburg, having been abandoned. In 1880, Ingalls incorporated the Cincinnati, Indianapolis, St. Louis & Chicago Railroad (CIStL&C) to take over the IC&L, the C&I, and a third road added during Lord's tenure, the Cincinnati, Lafayette, & Chicago. This company's unwieldy name made it difficult to add to schedule boards, and thus it was nicknamed the "Big Four".

When the Cleveland, Columbus, Cincinnati and Indianapolis Railway, controlled by the Vanderbilt family and nicknamed the "Bee Line", was merged with the CIStL&C in 1889, the new company, the Cleveland, Cincinnati, Chicago and St. Louis Railway, was similarly lengthy, and so the "Big Four" moniker stuck. The Big Four was controlled by the Vanderbilts' New York Central System, and would remain a New York Central (NYC) subsidiary until the Penn Central merger.

The Indianapolis-Cincinnati line was the Big Four's main line between the two cities, and thus hosted all NYC traffic between Cincinnati, Indianapolis, and Chicago. There was enough traffic that a second main track was added between Greensburg and Cincinnati, in 1909, and Automatic Block Signalling (ABS) was installed all the way to Shelbyville, in 1941. That same year, the James Whitcomb Riley, a streamlined all-coach passenger train, made its inaugural run over the line, connecting Chicago to Cincinnati, on a 5-and-a-half hour schedule. The train proved popular enough to be included in the initial Amtrak system in 1971. However, the Penn Central merger in 1968, and subsequent bankruptcy in 1970, led to a sharp decline in track conditions, and by 1973, all trains, including the Riley, were limited to 10 miles per hour (16 km/h) for fear of derailment. After a 60 Minutes exposé revealing the abysmal track conditions aired that year, public outcry forced Amtrak to move all its passenger trains off Penn Central trackage in 1974, but passenger numbers would never recover and the Riley was cancelled in 1977.

The second main was removed beginning in 1962, as Centralized Traffic Control (CTC) installation—completed between Greensburg and Cincinnati, in 1967, made the extra capacity redundant. A washout in the mid-1970s closed the line between Sunman, Indiana, and Thatcher (the railroad's name for Greendale), Indiana, forcing all through traffic onto alternate routes. Under Conrail ownership, local service along the northern part of the line was gradually reduced, trains from Shelbyville, only going as far as Batesville, Indiana, in the early 1980s, then just to Greensburg, by 1983. In 1985, realizing the line's importance to the region's economy, the State of Indiana funded a reconstruction of the entire line, and in October, Conrail began operating 2 trains a week in each direction between Indianapolis and Cincinnati, on what it called the "Shelbyville Secondary".

The customer base remained small and in 1990, Conrail abolished the trains, expressing its intention to abandon the line between Shelbyville and Thatcher. Kokomo Grain Company, which had organized the Central Railroad of Indianapolis (CERA) in 1989, under its Central Properties, Inc., holding company, reached an agreement to acquire the Shelbyville Secondary from Shelbyville to Cincinnati, from Conrail, in December 1991, and the new Central Railroad of Indiana (CIND) began operations on December 31, over the 85 miles (137 km) of track, with connection to Indianapolis through trackage rights on Conrail.

In 1997, after heavy rains the year before, the CIND decided to embargo the line between Sunman and Thatcher, just as Conrail had done years earlier. CIND management also instituted surcharges of up to $1000/carload on cars interchanged at the railroad's western interchange points of Shelbyville and Frankfort, Indiana, prompting a lawsuit by shippers on the line. The railroad filed an official request to abandon the embargoed segment in 1998, but was denied.

The same year, both the CIND and the CERA were purchased by RailTex-owned Indiana & Ohio Railway (IORY), though they continued to operate as separate entities. Under RailTex ownership, the CIND decided to restore the Sunman-Thatcher section instead of abandoning it, and the shippers' lawsuit, asking for the courts to penalize the railroad for the embargo and surcharges, was denied. In 2000, RailTex was itself acquired by RailAmerica, another large shortline holding company, but traffic remained slim, and the line between Greensburg and Shelbyville, was placed out of service in 2006. The fortunes of the CIND greatly improved when Honda Manufacturing of Indiana opened their Greensburg, Indiana, plant in 2008. The plant is exclusively served by the CIND, and has a capacity of 250,000 vehicles annually, which necessitates a daily train, a frequency not seen on the line since the 1970s. RailAmerica was sold to Genessee & Wyoming in 2012, but operations have continued relatively unchanged as of 2023.

== Route description ==
Beginning in Shelby County, Indiana, the line runs generally southeast from Shelbyville through the towns of Prescott, Waldron and Saint Paul, then the Decatur County towns of Adams, Greensburg and New Point. At this point a short stretch of the line passes east through the extreme southwestern corner of Franklin County, then heads southeast through the Ripley County communities of Batesville, Morris, Spades and Sunman, and the Dearborn County towns of Weisburg, Kennedy, Guilford and Greendale. The line runs adjacent to CSX Transportation's former Baltimore and Ohio Railroad Cincinnati to St. Louis main line from CIND MP 2.5 (Storrs) to MP 17.7 (Valley Junction). The line between the Honda plant in Batesville (approx. MP 63) and the CSX connection in Shelbyville is out-of-service, though the track is still largely intact.

== Mileposts ==
2.5	Storrs
2.9	CP West Oak
4.5	CP Wade
10.6	Delhi
12.0	Fernbank
13.2	Addyston
15.3	North Bend
16.1	Cleves
17.7	Valley
19.5	Elizabethtown
20.5	State Line (IN/OH)
22.3	CP 22
27.9	Guilford
30.4	Ross
36.8	Weisburg
39.9	Sunman
45.3	Morris
46.2	Hyde
47.8	Batesville
54.0	New Point
62.8	Greensburg
67.8	Adams
72.7	St. Paul
75.3	Waldron
82.8	Shelbyville (begin CSX trackage rights)

== Locomotive roster ==
The CIND shares power with the IORY primarily, and G&W more broadly, and thus owns few locomotives of its own. Locomotives with CIND reporting marks and/or operating on the CIND as of 2023 include:

Reporting Mark	Number	Type	Build Date	Note
CIND	2001	RB20BD	2012	Rebuilt from GG20B
CIND	2002	RB20BD	2012	Rebuilt from GG20B
CIND	2342	SW1500	1970	ex-Pittsburgh Industrial Railroad, exx-NS, née-Southern
TP&W	5008	GP50	1980	ex-CIND 5008, née-BN
TP&W	5010	GP50	1980	ex-CIND 5000, exx-BN, née-SLSF
IORY	5012	GP50	1980	ex-CBNS 5002, née-BN
IORY	5013	GP50	1980	ex-CIND 5003, née-BN
IORY	5014	GP50	1980	ex-CBNS 5004, née-BN
IORY	3222	SD40-2	1973	ex-UP, née-C&NW
IORY	3313	SD40-2	1980	ex-OHCR 3313, exx-NS 3561, née-BN 8142
IORY	3527	GP38-2	1972	ex-UP 321, née-MP 907
LTEX	2400	SD60M	1990	ex-UP 6264
LTEX	2411	SD60M	1990	ex-UP 6257; "Triclops"
LTEX	2446	SD60M	1991	ex-UP 6291
LTEX	8641	SD50-2	1985	ex-CSX, née-C&O (Chessie System)

== Bibliography ==
- "RailAmerica's Empire". Trains Magazine. Kalmbach Publishing. June 2010.
- Simons, Richard S.; Parker, Francis H. (1997). Railroads of Indiana. Indiana University Press. ISBN 0-253-33351-2.
- "CENTRAL RAILROAD OF INDIANA (CIND)". 2023.
- "Consolidated Rail Corporation - Freight Schedules" (PDF). 1 October 1985.
- Harlow, Alvin F. (1947). "16". The Road of the Century. New York: Creative Age Press, Inc.
- "Central Railroad of Indiana". cincyrails.com.
- Lewis, Edward A. (1996). American Shortline Railway Guide. Kalmbach Publishing Co. pp. 71–72. ISBN 978-0-89024-290-2.
- "Indiana Railroad Abandonments" (PDF). Indiana Department of Transportation.
- "DECATUR COUNTY COMMISSIONERS v. SURFACE TRANSPORTATION BOARD (2002)". 15 October 2002.
- Burns, Adam (10 October 2023). "Indiana And Ohio Railway". American-Rails.com.
