= Action Airpark =

- IATA: none; ICAO: none; FAA LID: I38

Summary
- Airport type: Public use
- Owner: Bill P. Fisher
- Serves: Greendale / Lawrenceburg
- Location: Hardinsburg, Dearborn County, Indiana
- Closed: After 1997
- Elevation AMSL: 465 ft (142 m)
- Coordinates: 39°08′12″N 84°49′46″W

Map
- Location of airport in Indiana

Runways
Direction	Length		Surface
Direction	ft	m	Surface
2/20	1,577	481	Turf

Statistics (1997)
- Aircraft operations: 436
- Based aircraft: 1
- Source: Federal Aviation Administration

Action Airpark (FAA LID: I38) was a privately owned, public use ultralight airport in Dearborn County, Indiana, United States. As per FAA records, it was one nautical mile (2 km) northeast of the central business district of Hardenstown, Indiana. The airpark was near Hardinsburg, an unincorporated town in Lawrenceburg Township, near the cities of Greendale and Lawrenceburg.

== Facilities and aircraft ==
Action Airpark covered an area of 18 acres (7 ha) at an elevation of 465 feet (142 m) above mean sea level. It had one runway designated 2/20 with a turf surface measuring 1,577 by 100 feet (481 x 30 m).

For the 12-month period ending August 18, 1997, the airport had 436 aircraft operations, an average of 36 per month: 97% general aviation and 3% military. At that time there was one ultralight aircraft based at this airport.

== See also ==
- List of airports in Indiana
