= Sparta Township, Indiana =

Sparta Township, Indiana may refer to one of the following places:

- Sparta Township, Dearborn County, Indiana
- Sparta Township, Noble County, Indiana

See also

- Sparta Township (disambiguation)
