= Indiana State Road 148 =

State highway in Indiana, United States

State Road 148
- SR 148 highlighted in red

Route information
- Maintained by INDOT
- Length: 5.114 mi (8.230 km)
- Existed: 1932–present

Major junctions
- West end: SR 48 near Wrights Corner
- East end: US 50 at Aurora

Location
- Country: United States
- State: Indiana
- Counties: Dearborn

Highway system
- Indiana State Highway System; Interstate; US; State; Scenic
← SR 145	→ SR 149

State Road 148 (SR 148) is a part of the Indiana State Road that runs between rural Dearborn County and Aurora in US state of Indiana. The 5.12 miles (8.24 km) of SR 148 that lie within Indiana serve as a minor highway. None of the highway is listed on the National Highway System. The whole road is a rural two-lane highway, passes through mostly woodlands. SR 148 was first designated as a state road in 1932. The highway replaced the original State Road 48 designation of the highway which dated back to 1926.

== Route description ==
SR 148 begins at an intersection with SR 48, in rural Dearborn County. The highway heads southwest as a two-lane highway passing mostly through woodland, with some farmland. The route curves southeast and heads towards Aurora. The road enters Aurora, passing through mostly residential properties. SR 148 ends at a traffic signal with U.S. Route 50 (US 50), near the Ohio River.

No segment of State Road 148 in Indiana is included in the National Highway System (NHS). The NHS is a network of highways that are identified as being most important for the economy, mobility and defense of the nation. Like all other state roads in Indiana, the highway is maintained by the Indiana Department of Transportation (INDOT). The department tracks the traffic volumes along all state roads as a part of its maintenance responsibilities using a metric called average annual daily traffic (AADT). This measurement is a calculation of the traffic level along a segment of roadway for any average day of the year. In 2010, INDOT figured that lowest traffic levels were 1,890 vehicles and 70 commercial vehicles used the highway daily near the intersection with US 50. The peak traffic volumes were 4,330 vehicles and 120 commercial vehicles AADT along the section of SR 148 at its western terminus near SR 48.

== History ==
The route at SR 148 takes today became a state road in 1927 as SR 48 and the current SR 48 was signed as SR 46. In 1932 the number to the route was changed to SR 148 and SR 48 was moved onto its current route.

== Major intersections ==
The entire route is in Dearborn County.

Location	mi	km	Destinations	Notes
Manchester Township	0.000	0.000	SR 48 – Napoleon, Lawrenceburg	Western terminus of SR 148
Aurora	5.114	8.230	US 50 / SR 56 / SR 350	Eastern terminus of SR 148
1.000 mi = 1.609 km; 1.000 km = 0.621 mi
