= Sparta (disambiguation) =

Sparta was a prominent city-state in ancient Greece.

Sparta may also refer to:

== Places ==
- Sparta (modern city), a city and municipality in Greece that lies at the site of ancient Sparta

=== Canada ===
- Sparta, Ontario, a historic village in Canada
- Sparta, or Sparty-Wharf, a hamlet in Box Grove, Ontario 1850 to 1867

=== United States ===
- Sparta, Georgia, a city
- Sparta, Illinois, a city
- Sparta, Indiana, an unincorporated community
- Sparta, Kentucky, a city
- Sparta, Louisiana, an unincorporated community
- Sparta, Michigan, a village
- Sparta, Mississippi, an unincorporated community
- Sparta, Missouri, a city
- Sparta, Buchanan County, Missouri, an unincorporated community
- Sparta, Nebraska, an unincorporated community
- Sparta, New Jersey, a township
- Sparta, New York, a township, Livingston County
- Sparta, North Carolina
- Sparta, Ohio, a village
- Sparta, Tennessee, a city
- Sparta, Wisconsin, a city
- Sparta (town), Wisconsin, a town

== Sports ==
=== Czech Republic ===
- Sparta Prague, a Czech multi-sports club:
  - AC Sparta Prague, men's football team
  - AC Sparta Praha (women), women's football team
  - HC Sparta Praha, ice hockey team
  - BC Sparta Prague, men's basketball team
  - BLC Sparta Prague, women's basketball team
  - RC Sparta Prague, rugby union team
  - AC Sparta Praha (cycling team)
  - TK Sparta Prague, a tennis club and training center
  - Sparta Prague Open, a tennis tournament
- SK Sparta Kolín, a Czech football team
- SK Sparta Krč, a Czech football team

=== Netherlands ===
- Sparta-Feyenoord, a Dutch baseball team
- Sparta Rotterdam, a Dutch football team

=== Norway ===
- IL Sparta, a Norwegian multi-sport club
  - Sparta Warriors, ice hockey team of IL Sparta
  - Sparta Amfi, an indoor ice hockey rink, belonging to IL Sparta
- FK Sparta Sarpsborg (2004-2007), later Sarpsborg 08 FF, a Norwegian football team

=== Poland ===
- Sparta Brodnica, a Polish football team
- Sparta Janowiec Wielkopolski, a Polish football team
- Sparta Lwów, a Polish football team
- Sparta Szamotuły, a Polish football team
- Sparta Wrocław, a Polish motorcycle speedway team
- Sparta Złotów, a Polish multi-sports club

=== Other ===
- Sparta F.C., a Greek football club
- Sparta (athletic club), a Danish athletic club
- CF Sparta, a Moldovan football club
- Sparta, a racehorse which failed to complete the 1848 Grand National

== Arts and entertainment ==
- Sparta (film), a 2022 film directed by Ulrich Seidl
- Ancient Wars: Sparta, a real-time strategy computer game
- Sparta, a fictional planet in the CoDominium series of books by Jerry Pournelle
- Sparta, a fictional planet in the novel A Spartan Planet by A. Bertram Chandler
- Sparta, part four of the limited series Herogasm as part of The Boys comic book franchise
- "This is Sparta!", an internet meme originating from the film 300

=== Music ===
- Sparta (album), an album by M.O.P.
- Sparta (band), a band formed by ex-members of At the Drive-In
- "Sparta", a song by Sabaton from The Last Stand
- "Sparta", a song by Warkings from Reborn

== Other uses ==
- Sparta Battalion, a military unit of the Russian Armed Forces
- Sparta (mythology), mythical first queen of Sparta, eponym of the city-state
- SPARTA, Inc., a United States defense contractor
- Laconian (dog), an extinct breed of dog also known as the Spartan
- Sparta (moth), a genus of moth
- Sparta (rocket), an Australian rocket
- Sparta (ship), a Russian fishing trawler
- Sparta, the nickname for a Panthera spelaea cub discovered preserved in permafrost

== See also ==
- Duke of Sparta, title of the heir apparent to the Greek throne
- Spartoi or Sparti, a group of mythical beings figuring in the founding myths of the ancient Greek city of Thebes
- Nueva Esparta, a state in Venezuela
- Nueva Esparta, El Salvador
- Esparta, a municipality in the Honduras
- Isparta, a city in Turkey
- Sparta Township (disambiguation)
- Spartak (disambiguation)
- Spartan (disambiguation)
- Spata (disambiguation)
- Laconia (disambiguation)
