= Logan, Indiana =

Logan, Indiana may refer to:

- Logan, Dearborn County, Indiana

== See also ==
- Logan Township, Indiana (disambiguation)
