= Hidden Valley, Indiana =

- Census-designated place
- Flag Logo

- Location of Hidden Valley in Dearborn County, Indiana.
- Coordinates: 39°10′02″N 84°50′40″W
- Country: United States
- State: Indiana
- County: Dearborn
- Townships: Miller, Lawrenceburg

Area
  - Total: 4.44 sq mi (11.51 km^{2})
  - Land: 4.24 sq mi (10.98 km^{2})
  - Water: 0.20 sq mi (0.53 km^{2})
- Elevation: 715 ft (218 m)

Population (2020)
  - Total: 5,529
  - Density: 1,303.7/sq mi (503.36/km^{2})
- Time zone: UTC-5 (EST)
  - Summer (DST): UTC-4 (EDT)
- ZIP code: 47025
- Area codes: 812 and 930
- FIPS code: 18-33392
- GNIS feature ID: 2393048
- Website: hiddenvalleylakeindiana.com

Hidden Valley is a private residential community in Dearborn County, Indiana, United States. For statistical purposes it is a census-designated place (CDP). As of the 2020 census, Hidden Valley had a population of 5,529.

== History ==
The community and lake were built by land developer James Jacob Rupel, who was active in the Greater Dayton area and Indiana for over 50 years and the former owner of Centre City Building and the Carillon House in downtown Dayton. He was the developer of Hidden Valley Lake, several subdivisions near Rocky Fork State Park in Highland County, Ohio, the Valley Woods community in Greendale, Indiana, and the Country Squire Lakes community in North Vernon, Indiana.

== Geography ==
Hidden Valley is located in eastern Dearborn County within Miller and Lawrenceburg townships. It is bordered to the south by the city of Greendale and to the east by the Ohio state line. Downtown Cincinnati is 23 miles (37 km) to the east.

According to the United States Census Bureau, the Hidden Valley CDP has a total area of 4.4 square miles (11.4 km^{2}), of which 4.1 square miles (10.7 km^{2}) is land and 0.3 square miles (0.7 km^{2}), or 6.12%, is water.

== Demographics ==
Historical population
Census	Pop.	Note	%±
2020	5,529		—
U.S. Decennial Census

=== 2020 census ===
As of the 2020 census, Hidden Valley had a population of 5,529. The median age was 43.1 years. 24.3% of residents were under the age of 18 and 18.0% of residents were 65 years of age or older. For every 100 females there were 101.2 males, and for every 100 females age 18 and over there were 101.5 males age 18 and over.

100.0% of residents lived in urban areas, while 0.0% lived in rural areas.

There were 1,971 households in Hidden Valley, of which 33.8% had children under the age of 18 living in them. Of all households, 69.7% were married-couple households, 12.3% were households with a male householder and no spouse or partner present, and 12.4% were households with a female householder and no spouse or partner present. About 15.2% of all households were made up of individuals and 6.5% had someone living alone who was 65 years of age or older.

There were 2,059 housing units, of which 4.3% were vacant. The homeowner vacancy rate was 0.7% and the rental vacancy rate was 9.4%.

Racial composition as of the 2020 census
Race	Number	Percent
White	5,202	94.1%
Black or African American	17	0.3%
American Indian and Alaska Native	1	0.0%
Asian	25	0.5%
Native Hawaiian and Other Pacific Islander	1	0.0%
Some other race	39	0.7%
Two or more races	244	4.4%
Hispanic or Latino (of any race)	81	1.5%

=== 2000 census ===
As of the census of 2000, there were 4,417 people, 1,542 households, and 1,318 families residing in the CDP. The population density was 1,047.8 inhabitants per square mile (404.6/km^{2}). There were 1,599 housing units at an average density of 379.3 per square mile (146.4/km^{2}). The racial makeup of the CDP was 97.83% White, 0.27% African American, 0.18% Native American, 0.50% Asian, 0.07% Pacific Islander, 0.34% from other races, and 0.82% from two or more races. Hispanic or Latino of any race were 0.82% of the population.

There were 1,542 households, out of which 40.9% had children under the age of 18 living with them, 78.3% were married couples living together, 4.7% had a female householder with no husband present, and 14.5% were non-families. 10.7% of all households were made up of individuals, and 2.9% had someone living alone who was 65 years of age or older. The average household size was 2.86 and the average family size was 3.10.

In the CDP, the population was spread out, with 28.1% under the age of 18, 5.7% from 18 to 24, 31.8% from 25 to 44, 26.6% from 45 to 64, and 7.8% who were 65 years of age or older. The median age was 37 years. For every 100 females, there were 102.0 males. For every 100 females age 18 and over, there were 100.3 males.

The median income for a household in the CDP was $70,444, and the median income for a family was $72,892. Males had a median income of $46,168 versus $31,968 for females. The per capita income for the CDP was $25,464. About 2.9% of families and 2.8% of the population were below the poverty line, including 4.0% of those under age 18 and 3.1% of those age 65 or over.
