= Sparta Township, Dearborn County, Indiana =

Sparta Township
- Township
- Location of Sparta Township in Dearborn County
- Coordinates: 39°04′58″N 85°03′35″W
- Country: United States
- State: Indiana
- County: Dearborn

Government
  - Type: Indiana township

Area
  - Total: 29.46 sq mi (76.3 km^{2})
  - Land: 29.44 sq mi (76.2 km^{2})
  - Water: 0.02 sq mi (0.052 km^{2})
- Elevation: 850 ft (260 m)

Population (2020)
  - Total: 2,887
  - Density: 98.3/sq mi (38.0/km^{2})
- FIPS code: 18-71738
- GNIS feature ID: 453857

Sparta Township is one of fourteen townships in Dearborn County, Indiana. As of the 2010 census, its population was 2,894 and it contained 1,144 housing units.

== Geography ==
According to the 2010 census, the township has a total area of 29.46 square miles (76.3 km^{2}), of which 29.44 square miles (76.2 km^{2}) (or 99.93%) is land and 0.02 square miles (0.052 km^{2}) (or 0.07%) is water.

=== Cities and towns ===
- Moores Hill

=== Unincorporated towns ===
- Chesterville
- Cold Springs
- Dillsboro Station
- Sparta

(This list is based on USGS data and may include former settlements.)

=== Adjacent townships ===
- Manchester Township (northeast)
- Hogan Township (east)
- Washington Township (southeast)
- Clay Township (south)
- Washington Township, Ripley County (west)
- Franklin Township, Ripley County (northwest)

=== Major highways ===
- Indiana State Road 350

=== Cemeteries ===
The township contains fifteen cemeteries: Beatty, Bedunnah, Churchill, Concord, Eden, Forest Hill, Heaton, McKinstry, Olcott, Record, Todd, Transier, Turner, Union and Whiteford.

== Education ==
Sparta Township residents may obtain a library card at the Aurora Public Library in Aurora.
