= Wrights Corners =

Wrights Corners may refer to the following places in the United States:

- Wrights Corners, a hamlet partly in Lockport (town), New York, partly in Newfane, in Niagara County
- Wrights Corners, Herkimer County, New York, a hamlet in Little Falls (town), New York
- Wrights Corners, Wisconsin, an unincorporated community in the town of Trempealeau, Trempealeau County

== See also ==
- Wrights Corner, Indiana
