= Indiana State Road 350 =

State highway in Indiana, United States

State Road 350
- SR 350 highlighted in red

Route information
- Maintained by INDOT
- Length: 23.416 mi (37.684 km)
- Existed: 1931–present

Major junctions
- West end: US 421 at Osgood
- East end: US 50 / SR 56 at Aurora

Location
- Country: United States
- State: Indiana
- Counties: Dearborn, Ripley

Highway system
- Indiana State Highway System; Interstate; US; State; Scenic
← SR 341	→ SR 352

State Road 350 (SR 350) is a state road in the south–eastern section of the state of Indiana. Running for about 23 miles (37 km) in a general east–west direction, connecting Osgood, Milan, and Aurora. SR 350 was originally introduced in the 1931 routed between Milan and Aurora. The road was extended west to the Osgood in 1932. In 1950s the SR 350 had a couple of minor realignments and a segment was paved. The rest of the route was paved in the early 1960s.

== Route description ==
SR 350 starts in Osgood at the corner of Buckeye Street and Beech Street. Buckeye Street runs northwest–southeast carrying U.S. Route 421, and Beech Street runs northeasterly from here carrying SR 350. The highway passes through residential neighborhoods, before leaving Osgood. After leaving Osgood the road turns more east–west passing through rural Ripley County. The highway enters the community of Delaware and has an intersection with SR 129. After SR 129 the road becomes southeast–northwest and heads towards Pierceville. In Pierceville the road parallels a CSX Transportation rail track, passing a few residential properties.

East of Pierceville SR 350 turns towards the east leaves the rail track and passes through rural Ripley County for a short distance before entering the town of Milan. The highway passes through the northern part of Milan and an intersection with SR 101. After Milan the road turns towards the southeast and passes north of Moores Hill, before passing through rural Dearborn County. While in rural Dearborn County the road passes near Sparta, Mount Sinai, and just north of Wilmington. East of Wilmington SR 350 passes South Dearborn High School, before entering Aurora. In Aurora the roadway crosses over the south fork of the Hogan Creek. The SR 350 designation ends at an intersection with US 50 crossing northeast–southwest and SR 56 continuing towards the southeast.

== History ==
SR 350 had its beginning in 1931 when it was designated, by Indiana State Highway Commission, from Milan to Aurora. By September 1932 SR 350 was extended west to an intersection with SR 29 (now US 421), in Osgood. The road was moved to its modern routing between Sparta and north of Milan between 1956 and 1957. Between 1957 and 1959 the road was rerouted around Mount Sinai onto the modern routing. At the same time the road was paved between the eastern in of the reroute and Wilmington was paved. The rest of SR 350 was paved between 1960 and 1961. Since the road was paved, SR 350 has not undergone any major changes.

== Major intersections ==
County	Location	mi	km	Destinations	Notes
Ripley	Osgood	0.000	0.000	US 421 – Versailles, Greensburg	Western terminus of SR 350
Ripley	Delaware	5.159	8.303	SR 129 – Batesville	
Ripley	Milan	9.448	15.205	SR 101 to US 50 – Sunman	
Dearborn	Aurora	23.416	37.684	US 50 / SR 56 west – Rising Sun, Lawrenceburg, Versailles	Eastern terminus of SR 350; Eastern terminus of SR 56
1.000 mi = 1.609 km; 1.000 km = 0.621 mi
