= CIND =

CIND may refer to

- Central Railroad of Indiana
- CIND-FM, an FM radio station in Toronto, Ontario, Canada
