= Jackson Township, Dearborn County, Indiana =

Jackson Township
- Township
- Location of Jackson Township in Dearborn County
- Coordinates: 39°15′18″N 85°03′09″W
- Country: United States
- State: Indiana
- County: Dearborn

Government
  - Type: Indiana township

Area
  - Total: 24.72 sq mi (64.0 km^{2})
  - Land: 24.67 sq mi (63.9 km^{2})
  - Water: 0.05 sq mi (0.13 km^{2})
- Elevation: 994 ft (303 m)

Population (2020)
  - Total: 1,705
  - Density: 69.1/sq mi (26.7/km^{2})
- FIPS code: 18-36900
- GNIS feature ID: 453438

Jackson Township is one of fourteen townships in Dearborn County, Indiana. As of the 2010 census, its population was 1,705 and it contained 624 housing units.

== History ==
Jackson Township was organized in 1832. It was originally a part of Kelso Township. The first settlement in this Township was made by Isaac Lawrence, Senior, who emigrated from Pennsylvania in the spring of 1818, and settled on the Northwest quarter of section 17. Mr. Lawrence brought with him eight sons and two daughters, who settled in the same neighborhood, each on a quarter section.

Prior to the change from Ohio to Indiana, both Isaac and his brother Volentine settled here with their families. Check property records dated April 27, 1818 #547 and #548. Volentine continued to purchase property over the next several years #365, 088, 386, 404, and 294. "Volentine Lawrence of Dearborne County Ohio having deposited in the General Land-Office a Certificate of the Register of the Land-Office at Cincinnati whereby it appears that full payment has been made for the South West Quarter of Section two, in township Seven of the Range two"

== Geography ==
According to the 2010 census, the township has a total area of 24.72 square miles (64.0 km^{2}), of which 24.67 square miles (63.9 km^{2}) (or 99.80%) is land and 0.05 square miles (0.13 km^{2}) (or 0.20%) is water.

=== Unincorporated towns ===
- Hubbells Corner
- Lawrenceville
- Weisburg

(This list is based on USGS data and may include former settlements.)

=== Major highways ===
- Interstate 74
- Indiana State Road 46
