= Logan Township, Indiana =

Logan Township is the name of three townships in the U.S. state of Indiana:

- Logan Township, Dearborn County, Indiana
- Logan Township, Fountain County, Indiana
- Logan Township, Pike County, Indiana
