= Hardinsburg =

Hardinsburg can refer to some places in the United States:

- Hardinsburg, Indiana, a town in Washington County
- Hardinsburg, Dearborn County, Indiana, an unincorporated place
- Hardinsburg, Kentucky, a city
