= Yorkville =

Yorkville may refer to:

== Locations ==
=== Canada ===
- Yorkville, Toronto, a neighbourhood in Toronto, Canada
  - Yorkville Village
- Bay station, a subway station in Toronto, Canada
- Yorkville University, a private university located in New Brunswick

=== United States ===
- Yorkville, California, Mendocino County
- Yorkville, Georgia
- Yorkville, Illinois
- Yorkville, Indiana
- Yorkville, Manhattan, a neighborhood in New York City
- Yorkville, Oneida County, New York
- Yorkville, Michigan
- Yorkville, Ohio
- Yorkville (Pottsville, Pennsylvania), a neighborhood
- Yorkville, South Carolina
- Yorkville, Tennessee
- Yorkville, Wisconsin
  - Yorkville (community), Wisconsin

== Other ==
- Yorkville Sound, a brand of audio equipment
