= Manchester, Indiana =

Manchester
- Unincorporated community Census designated place
- Location within Dearborn County, Indiana
- Coordinates: 39°09′04″N 85°00′43″W
- Country: United States
- State: Indiana
- County: Dearborn
- Township: Manchester
- Elevation: 919 ft (280 m)
- ZIP code: 47041
- GNIS feature ID: 2830845

Manchester is an unincorporated community and census-designated place (CDP) in Manchester Township, Dearborn County, Indiana. The population was 3,304 as of 2023.

== History ==
A post office was established at Manchester in 1822, and remained in operation until it was discontinued in 1914. The community was named from Manchester Township.

== Demographics ==
Historical population
| Census | Pop. | Note | %± |

The United States Census Bureau defined Manchester as a census designated place in the 2023 American Community Survey.
