= York Township, Dearborn County, Indiana =

York Township
- Township
- Location of York Township in Dearborn County
- Coordinates: 39°11′15″N 84°57′17″W
- Country: United States
- State: Indiana
- County: Dearborn

Government
  - Type: Indiana township

Area
  - Total: 18.59 sq mi (48.1 km^{2})
  - Land: 18.59 sq mi (48.1 km^{2})
  - Water: 0 sq mi (0 km^{2})
- Elevation: 869 ft (265 m)

Population (2020)
  - Total: 1,148
  - Density: 65.7/sq mi (25.4/km^{2})
- FIPS code: 18-85958
- GNIS feature ID: 454067

York Township is one of fourteen townships in Dearborn County, Indiana. As of the 2010 census, its population was 1,221 and it contained 471 housing units.

== History ==
York Township was founded in 1841. A majority of the early settlers being natives of New York caused the name to be selected.

== Geography ==
According to the 2010 census, the township has a total area of 18.59 square miles (48.1 km^{2}), all land.

=== Unincorporated towns ===
- Guilford
- Yorkville

=== Major highways ===
- Indiana State Road 1

=== Cemeteries ===
The township contains one cemetery, West Fork.
