= Caesar Creek Township, Dearborn County, Indiana =

Caesar Creek Township
- Township
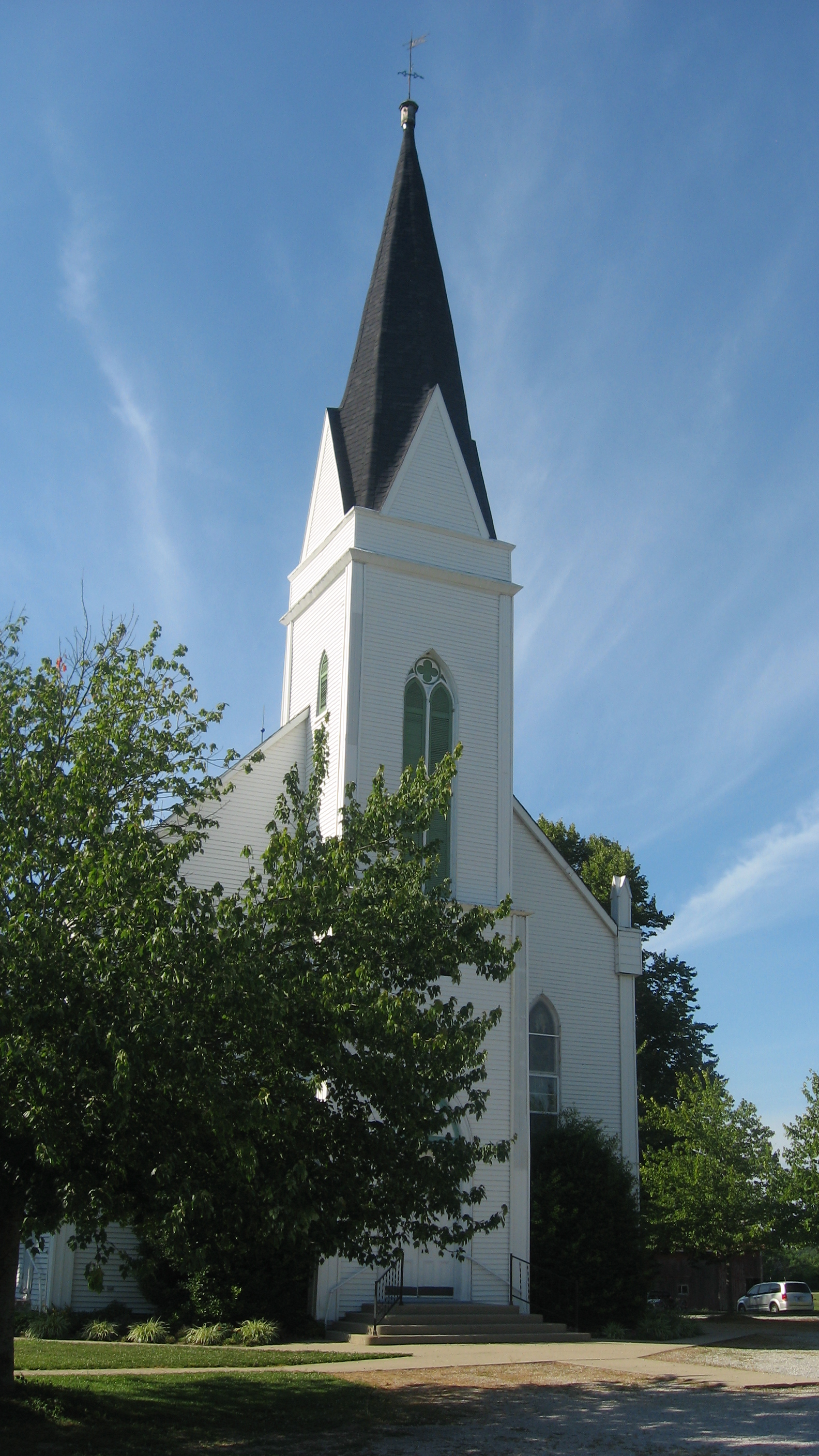
- St. John's Lutheran Church, a historic site in the township

- Location of Caesar Creek Township in Dearborn County
- Coordinates: 38°58′11″N 85°05′55″W
- Country: United States
- State: Indiana
- County: Dearborn

Government
  - Type: Indiana township

Area
  - Total: 11.94 sq mi (30.9 km^{2})
  - Land: 11.94 sq mi (30.9 km^{2})
  - Water: 0 sq mi (0 km^{2})
- Elevation: 879 ft (268 m)

Population (2020)
  - Total: 257
  - Density: 19.9/sq mi (7.7/km^{2})
- ZIP code: 47018
- Area codes: 812 and 930
- FIPS code: 18-09730
- GNIS feature ID: 453151

Caesar Creek Township is one of fourteen townships in Dearborn County, Indiana. As of the 2010 census, its population was 238 and it contained 119 housing units.

== History ==
Caesar Creek Township was established in 1826.

St. John's Lutheran Church and School was added to the National Register of Historic Places in 1996.

== Geography ==
According to the 2010 census, the township has a total area of 11.94 square miles (30.9 km^{2}), all land.

=== Unincorporated towns ===
- Farmers Retreat

(This list is based on USGS data and may include former settlements.)

=== Major highways ===
- Indiana State Road 62

=== Cemeteries ===
The township contains three cemeteries: Mount Hebron, Rand and Saint Johns.

== Education ==
Caesar Creek Township residents may obtain a library card at the Aurora Public Library in Aurora.
