= Bright, Indiana =

- Census-designated place
- Location of Bright in Dearborn County, Indiana.
- Coordinates: 39°13′35″N 84°51′55″W
- Country: United States
- State: Indiana
- County: Dearborn
- Townships: Logan, Harrison, Miller

Area
  - Total: 12.56 sq mi (32.53 km^{2})
  - Land: 12.54 sq mi (32.48 km^{2})
  - Water: 0.019 sq mi (0.05 km^{2})
- Elevation: 938 ft (286 m)

Population (2020)
  - Total: 5,814
  - Density: 460/sq mi (179/km^{2})
- Time zone: UTC-5 (Eastern (EST))
  - Summer (DST): UTC-4 (EDT)
- Postal code: 47025
- Area code: 812
- FIPS code: 18-07624
- GNIS feature ID: 2393348

Bright is an unincorporated community and census-designated place (CDP) in Dearborn County, Indiana, United States. The population was 5,814 at the 2020 census.

== History ==
A post office was established at Bright in 1847, and remained in operation until it was discontinued in 1904.

At least since the 1980s, Bright has been transformed from a small town to an exurb of Cincinnati.

== Geography ==
Bright is located in northeastern Dearborn County in Logan, Harrison, and Miller townships. The eastern edge of the Bright CDP follows the Indiana–Ohio border. Harrison, Ohio, is 4 miles (6 km) to the northeast via Jamison Road, and downtown Cincinnati is 27 miles (43 km) to the east.

According to the United States Census Bureau, the Bright CDP has a total area of 12.6 square miles (32.6 km^{2}), of which 0.02 square miles (0.05 km^{2}), or 0.15%, is water.

== Demographics ==
Historical population
Census	Pop.	Note	%±
2000	5,405		—
2010	5,693		5.3%
2020	5,814		2.1%
U.S. Decennial Census

=== 2020 census ===
As of the 2020 census, Bright had a population of 5,814. The median age was 42.7 years. 23.3% of residents were under the age of 18 and 18.7% of residents were 65 years of age or older. For every 100 females there were 106.5 males, and for every 100 females age 18 and over there were 105.2 males age 18 and over.

0.0% of residents lived in urban areas, while 100.0% lived in rural areas.

There were 2,197 households in Bright, of which 32.5% had children under the age of 18 living in them. Of all households, 63.7% were married-couple households, 14.2% were households with a male householder and no spouse or partner present, and 16.6% were households with a female householder and no spouse or partner present. About 20.2% of all households were made up of individuals and 10.2% had someone living alone who was 65 years of age or older.

There were 2,249 housing units, of which 2.3% were vacant. The homeowner vacancy rate was 0.7% and the rental vacancy rate was 0.0%.

Racial composition as of the 2020 census
Race	Number	Percent
White	5,488	94.4%
Black or African American	18	0.3%
American Indian and Alaska Native	4	0.1%
Asian	14	0.2%
Native Hawaiian and Other Pacific Islander	3	0.1%
Some other race	29	0.5%
Two or more races	258	4.4%
Hispanic or Latino (of any race)	81	1.4%

=== 2000 census ===
As of the census of 2000, there were 5,405 people, 1,770 households, and 1,493 families residing in the CDP. The population density was 377.7 inhabitants per square mile (145.8/km^{2}). There were 1,811 housing units at an average density of 126.6 per square mile (48.9/km^{2}). The racial makeup of the CDP was 98.43% White, 0.41% African American, 0.11% Native American, 0.09% Asian, 0.30% from other races, and 0.67% from two or more races. Hispanic or Latino of any race were 0.63% of the population.

There were 1,770 households, out of which 46.8% had children under the age of 18 living with them, 73.4% were married couples living together, 8.3% had a female householder with no husband present, and 15.6% were non-families. 12.8% of all households were made up of individuals, and 3.7% had someone living alone who was 65 years of age or older. The average household size was 3.05 and the average family size was 3.36.

In the CDP, the population was spread out, with 31.7% under the age of 18, 7.9% from 18 to 24, 31.6% from 25 to 44, 22.1% from 45 to 64, and 6.7% who were 65 years of age or older. The median age was 34 years. For every 100 females, there were 100.6 males. For every 100 females age 18 and over, there were 98.4 males.

The median income for a household in the CDP was $63,813, and the median income for a family was $66,639. Males had a median income of $41,923 versus $27,917 for females. The per capita income for the CDP was $22,401. About 1.6% of families and 1.7% of the population were below the poverty line, including 1.8% of those under age 18 and 2.6% of those age 65 or over.
