= Kelso Township, Dearborn County, Indiana =

Kelso Township
- Township
- Location of Kelso Township in Dearborn County
- Coordinates: 39°15′20″N 84°58′18″W
- Country: United States
- State: Indiana
- County: Dearborn

Government
  - Type: Indiana township

Area
  - Total: 25.65 sq mi (66.4 km^{2})
  - Land: 25.62 sq mi (66.4 km^{2})
  - Water: 0.04 sq mi (0.10 km^{2})
- Elevation: 922 ft (281 m)

Population (2020)
  - Total: 2,469
  - Density: 91.4/sq mi (35.3/km^{2})
- FIPS code: 18-39330
- GNIS feature ID: 453523

Kelso Township is one of fourteen townships in Dearborn County, Indiana, United States. As of the 2010 census, its population was 2,341 and it contained 919 housing units.

== History ==
Kelso Township is one of the original townships of Dearborn County that also included what is now Jackson Township. Kelso Township was organized in the November 1826 session of the County Supervisors. Kelso Township was named for John Kelso, an Irish immigrant and pioneer settler.

In 1832 Jackson Township was created from the western portion of Kelso Township.

== Geography ==
According to the 2010 census, the township has a total area of 25.65 square miles (66.4 km^{2}), of which 25.62 square miles (66.4 km^{2}) (or 99.88%) is land and 0.04 square miles (0.10 km^{2}) (or 0.16%) is water.

=== Town ===
- Saint Leon

=== Unincorporated towns ===
- Dover
- New Alsace

(This list is based on USGS data and may include former settlements.)

=== Major highways ===
- Interstate 74
- Indiana State Road 1
- Indiana State Road 46
