= Penntown, Indiana =

- Unincorporated community and Census-designated place
- Location within Indiana Location within the United States
- Coordinates: 39°16′15″N 85°05′32″W
- Country: United States
- State: Indiana
- County: Ripley
- Township: Adams
- Elevation: 984 ft (300 m)
- Time zone: UTC-5 (Eastern (EST))
  - Summer (DST): UTC-4 (EDT)
- ZIP code: 47041
- Area codes: 812, 930
- GNIS feature ID: 2830516

Penntown is an unincorporated community in Adams Township, Ripley County, in the U.S. state of Indiana.

== History ==
Penntown was originally called Pennsylvaniaburg, and under the latter name was laid out in 1837. The community was named after Pennsylvania, the native state of a share of the early settlers.

== Demographics ==
The United States Census Bureau defined Penntown as a census designated place in the 2022 American Community Survey.
