= Dover, Indiana =

Dover
- Unincorporated community
- Location within Dearborn County, Indiana
- Coordinates: 39°14′29″N 84°56′52″W
- Country: United States
- State: Indiana
- County: Dearborn
- Township: Kelso
- Elevation: 945 ft (288 m)
- ZIP code: 47022
- FIPS code: 18-18514
- GNIS feature ID: 433657

Dover is an unincorporated community in Kelso Township, Dearborn County, Indiana.

== History ==
The first settlement was made at Dover in 1815.
