= Adams Township, Ripley County, Indiana =

Township in Indiana, United States

Adams Township
- Township
- Coordinates: 39°16′25″N 85°8′40″W
- Country: United States
- State: Indiana
- County: Ripley

Government
  - Type: Indiana township

Area
  - Total: 43.79 sq mi (113.4 km^{2})
  - Land: 43.26 sq mi (112.0 km^{2})
  - Water: 0.54 sq mi (1.4 km^{2})
- Elevation: 980 ft (300 m)

Population (2020)
  - Total: 5,165
  - Density: 119.4/sq mi (46.10/km^{2})
- Time zone: UTC-5 (Eastern (EST))
  - Summer (DST): UTC-4 (EDT)
- Area code: 812
- FIPS code: 18-00478
- GNIS feature ID: 453081

Adams Township is one of eleven townships in Ripley County, Indiana. As of the 2020 census, its population was 5,165 (up from 5,119 at 2010) and it contained 2,135 housing units.

Historical population
Census	Pop.	Note	%±
1890	2,328		—
1900	2,208		−5.2%
1910	2,066		−6.4%
1920	1,988		−3.8%
1930	1,984		−0.2%
1940	1,971		−0.7%
1950	1,865		−5.4%
1960	2,331		25.0%
1970	2,733		17.2%
1980	3,385		23.9%
1990	3,553		5.0%
2000	4,325		21.7%
2010	5,119		18.4%
2020	5,165		0.9%
Source: US Decennial Census

== Geography ==
According to the 2010 census, the township has a total area of 43.79 square miles (113.4 km^{2}), of which 43.26 square miles (112.0 km^{2}) (or 98.79%) is land and 0.54 square miles (1.4 km^{2}) (or 1.23%) is water.

=== Cities and towns ===
- Batesville (partial)
- Sunman

=== Unincorporated towns ===
- Morris
- Penntown
- Spades
