= Bonnell, Indiana =

Bonnell
- Unincorporated community
- Location within Dearborn County, Indiana
- Coordinates: 39°10′06″N 84°58′27″W
- Country: United States
- State: Indiana
- County: Dearborn
- Township: Manchester
- Elevation: 627 ft (191 m)
- ZIP code: 47022
- FIPS code: 18-06382
- GNIS feature ID: 431321

Bonnell is an unincorporated community in Manchester Township, Dearborn County, Indiana.

== History ==
The post office Bonnell once contained had the name Kennedy. It operated between 1885 and 1929.
