= West Harrison, Indiana =

- Town
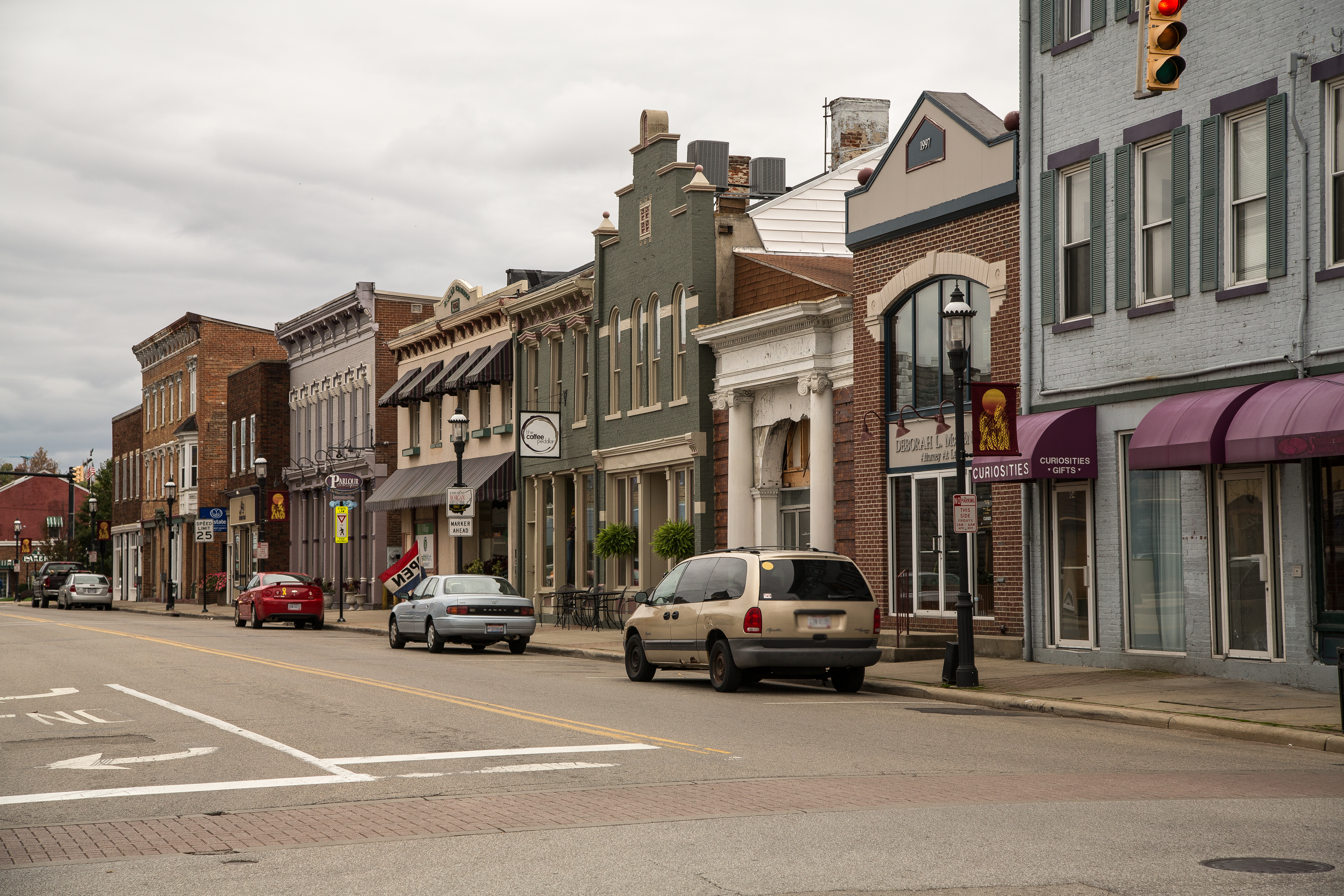
- Harrison Avenue

- Seal

- Location of West Harrison in Dearborn County, Indiana
- Coordinates: 39°15′29″N 84°49′22″W
- Country: United States
- State: Indiana
- County: Dearborn
- Township: Harrison

Area
  - Total: 0.23 sq mi (0.59 km^{2})
  - Land: 0.22 sq mi (0.57 km^{2})
  - Water: 0.0077 sq mi (0.02 km^{2})
- Elevation: 515 ft (157 m)

Population (2020)
  - Total: 325
  - Density: 1,470.1/sq mi (567.61/km^{2})
- Time zone: UTC-5 (Eastern (EST))
  - Summer (DST): UTC-4 (EDT)
- ZIP code: 47060
- Area code: 812
- FIPS code: 18-82790
- GNIS feature ID: 2397732
- Website: townofwestharrison.org

West Harrison is a town in Harrison Township, Dearborn County, Indiana, United States. The population was 325 at the 2020 census.

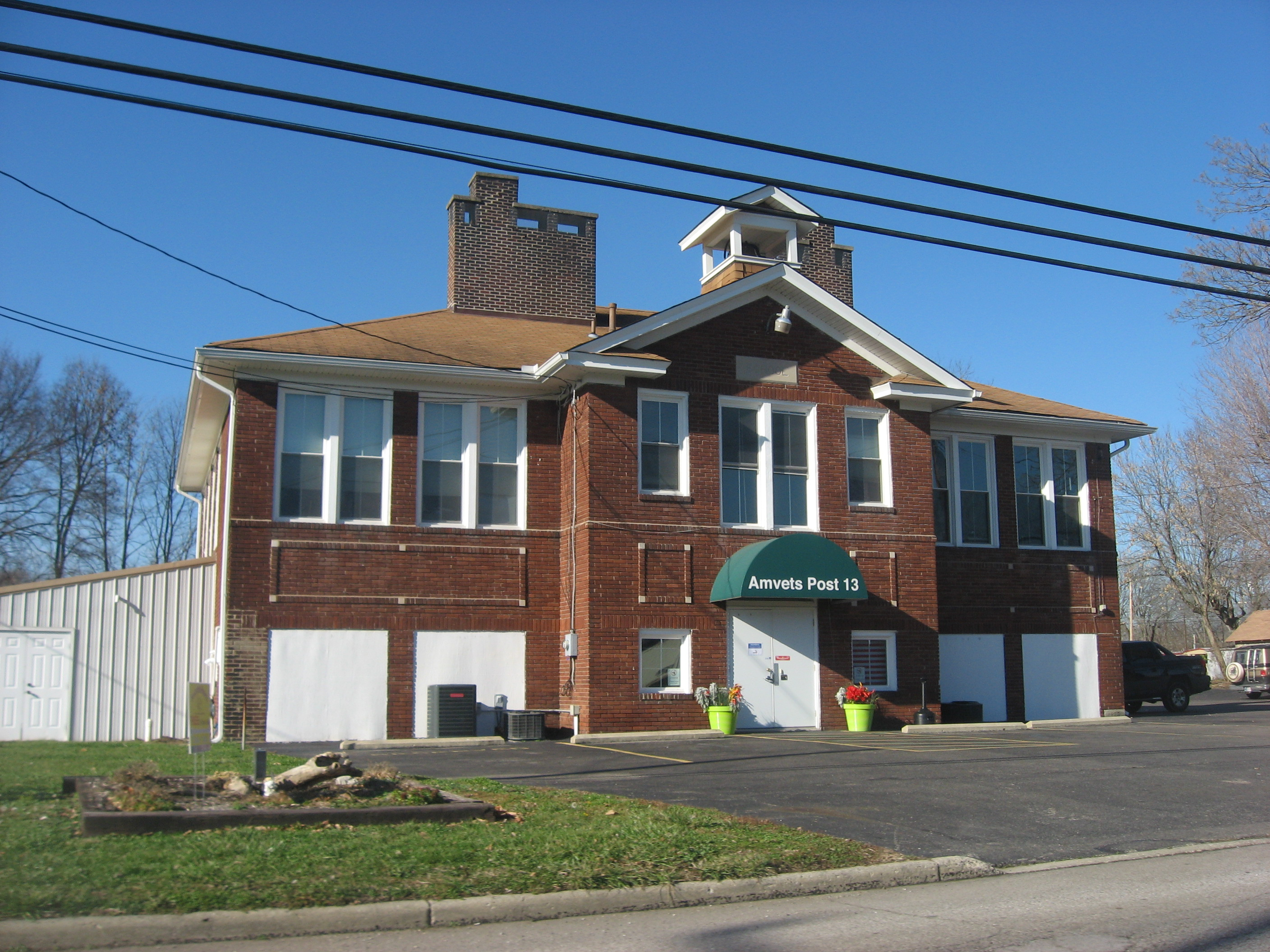
West Harrison's former school

== History ==
Settlers at West Harrison found numerous mounds constructed by Indians. West Harrison was laid out in 1813, the same year its twin city of Harrison, Ohio, was founded.

== Geography ==
West Harrison is located just across the Indiana state line from Harrison, Ohio. The two towns are divided by State Street.

According to the 2010 census, West Harrison has a total area of 0.228 square miles (0.59 km^{2}), of which 0.22 square miles (0.57 km^{2}) (or 96.49%) is land and 0.008 square miles (0.02 km^{2}) (or 3.51%) is water.

== Demographics ==
Historical population
Census	Pop.	Note	%±
1880	290		—
1890	320		10.3%
1900	304		−5.0%
1910	281		−7.6%
1920	258		−8.2%
1930	279		8.1%
1940	311		11.5%
1950	308		−1.0%
1960	341		10.7%
1970	395		15.8%
1980	328		−17.0%
1990	318		−3.0%
2000	284		−10.7%
2010	289		1.8%
2020	325		12.5%
U.S. Decennial Census

=== 2010 census ===
As of the census of 2010, there were 289 people, 136 households, and 68 families living in the town. The population density was 1,313.6 inhabitants per square mile (507.2/km^{2}). There were 174 housing units at an average density of 790.9 per square mile (305.4/km^{2}). The racial makeup of the town was 99.0% White, 0.3% African American, 0.3% Native American, and 0.3% Asian. Hispanic or Latino of any race were 0.3% of the population.

There were 136 households, of which 21.3% had children under the age of 18 living with them, 30.1% were married couples living together, 13.2% had a female householder with no husband present, 6.6% had a male householder with no wife present, and 50.0% were non-families. 43.4% of all households were made up of individuals, and 11% had someone living alone who was 65 years of age or older. The average household size was 2.13 and the average family size was 2.94.

The median age in the town was 42.2 years. 17.3% of residents were under the age of 18; 9.7% were between the ages of 18 and 24; 27.7% were from 25 to 44; 32.9% were from 45 to 64; and 12.5% were 65 years of age or older. The gender makeup of the town was 52.6% male and 47.4% female.

=== 2000 census ===
As of the census of 2000, there were 284 people, 142 households, and 70 families living in the town. The population density was 3,120.3 inhabitants per square mile (1,204.8/km^{2}). There were 151 housing units at an average density of 1,659.1 per square mile (640.6/km^{2}). The racial makeup of the town was 99.30% White, 0.35% Native American, and 0.35% from two or more races. Hispanic or Latino of any race were 0.70% of the population.

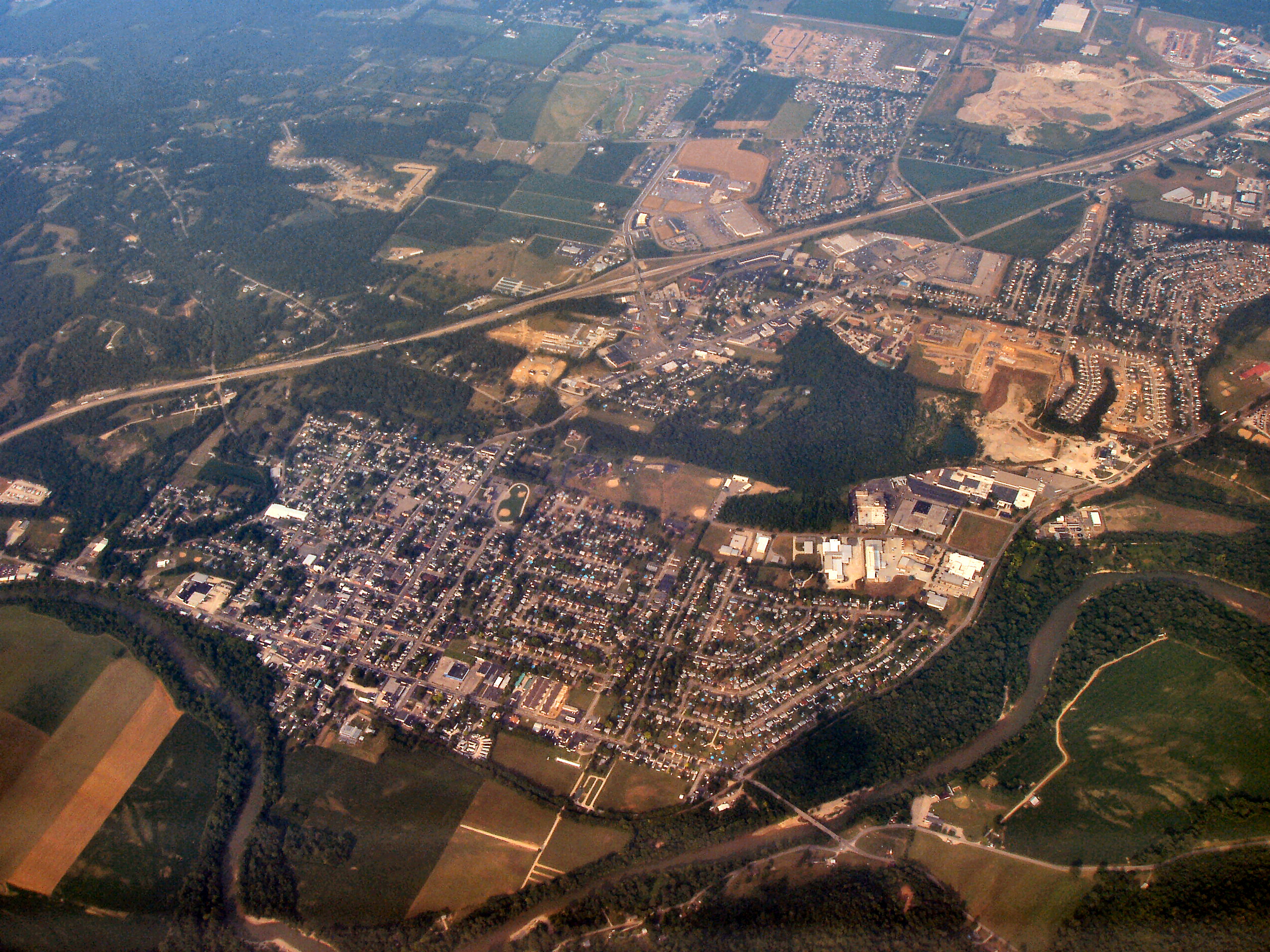
West Harrison (at bottom) with Whitewater River. Harrison, Ohio, is the larger town above. The state line runs almost horizontally near the bottom of the picture, along State Street.

There were 142 households, out of which 25.4% had children under the age of 18 living with them, 31.0% were married couples living together, 12.7% had a female householder with no husband present, and 50.7% were non-families. 46.5% of all households were made up of individuals, and 9.9% had someone living alone who was 65 years of age or older. The average household size was 2.00 and the average family size was 2.89.

In the town, the population was spread out, with 22.2% under the age of 18, 9.9% from 18 to 24, 33.8% from 25 to 44, 23.2% from 45 to 64, and 10.9% who were 65 years of age or older. The median age was 36 years. For every 100 females, there were 111.9 males. For every 100 females age 18 and over, there were 118.8 males.

The median income for a household in the town was $21,500, and the median income for a family was $23,750. Males had a median income of $32,344 versus $20,313 for females. The per capita income for the town was $12,667. About 32.4% of families and 31.6% of the population were below the poverty line, including 47.3% of those under the age of eighteen and 17.9% of those 65 or over.

== Notable people ==
- Lonnie Mack, singer-songwriter and guitarist
