= Chesterville, Indiana =

Chesterville
- Unincorporated community
- Location within Dearborn County, Indiana
- Coordinates: 39°04′04″N 85°03′08″W
- Country: United States
- State: Indiana
- County: Dearborn
- Township: Sparta
- Elevation: 876 ft (267 m)
- ZIP code: 47032
- FIPS code: 18-12430
- GNIS feature ID: 432459

Chesterville is an unincorporated community in Sparta Township, Dearborn County, Indiana.

== History ==
A post office was established at Chesterville in 1884, and remained in operation until it was discontinued in 1907.
