= Harrison Township, Dearborn County, Indiana =

Harrison Township
- Township
- Location of Harrison Township in Dearborn County
- Coordinates: 39°16′07″N 84°51′19″W
- Country: United States
- State: Indiana
- County: Dearborn

Government
  - Type: Indiana township

Area
  - Total: 17.26 sq mi (44.7 km^{2})
  - Land: 16.99 sq mi (44.0 km^{2})
  - Water: 0.26 sq mi (0.67 km^{2})
- Elevation: 528 ft (161 m)

Population (2020)
  - Total: 3,357
  - Density: 188.5/sq mi (72.8/km^{2})
- FIPS code: 18-31720
- GNIS feature ID: 453383

Harrison Township is one of fourteen townships in Dearborn County, Indiana. As of the 2010 census, its population was 3,204 and it contained 1,338 housing units.

== History ==
Harrison Township was organized in 1844.

== Geography ==
According to the 2010 census, the township has a total area of 17.26 square miles (44.7 km^{2}), of which 16.99 square miles (44.0 km^{2}) (or 98.44%) is land and 0.26 square miles (0.67 km^{2}) (or 1.51%) is water.

=== Cities and towns ===
- Bright (northeast quarter)
- West Harrison

=== Unincorporated towns ===
- Braysville

=== Major highways ===
- Interstate 74
- U.S. Route 52
- Indiana State Road 46

=== Cemeteries ===
The township contains two cemeteries: Braysville and Harrison Hills.
