= Indiana and Ohio Railway =

Tri-state railroad in the United States

Indiana & Ohio Railway
- Map

Overview
- Parent company: Genesee & Wyoming
- Headquarters: Cincinnati, Ohio
- Reporting mark: IORY
- Locale: Indiana, Michigan, Ohio
- Dates of operation: 1978–present

Technical
- Track gauge: 4 ft 8 1/2 in (1,435 mm) standard gauge
- Length: 511 miles (822 km)

Other
- Website: Official website

The Indiana & Ohio Railway (reporting mark IORY) is an American railroad that operates 511 miles (822 km) of track in Ohio, southern Michigan, and parts of southeastern Indiana. It is owned and operated by Genesee & Wyoming, who acquired the railroad in the 2012 purchase of RailAmerica.

As of 2025, IORY holds a total of 511 miles, 20 in Indiana, 23 in Michigan, and 468 in Ohio. The capacity is Blue Ash, Lebanon and Mason lines- 263k; 286k elsewhere.

== History ==
The IORY's original line, acquired in 1985, connected Mason and Monroe, Ohio. The IORY set up a tourist operation known as the Indiana & Ohio Scenic Railway which operated over this line. The tourist train still operates out of Lebanon, Ohio, under the ownership of the Cincinnati Railway Company (CRC) under the name Lebanon Mason Monroe Railroad.

Another line, acquired in 1986, runs from Norwood to Brecon, Ohio.

In 1991, the former DT&I between Washington Court House, Ohio, and Springfield, Ohio, came into the system via a designated operator agreement with the West Central Ohio Port Authority. The system expanded north into Michigan in 1997 when it acquired the remainder of the former DT&I mainline between Diann, Michigan, and Springfield.

The Indiana & Ohio Railroad (reporting mark INOH) merged into the IORY in 1997. It had been formed in 1978 to operate a branch between Valley Junction, Ohio, and Brookville, Indiana.

In 1994, IORY acquired two lines from Conrail in Springfield: one between Springfield and Bellefontaine; and one between Springfield and Mechanicsburg. The Indiana & Ohio Central Railroad (reporting mark IOCR) was the designated owner of these two lines until 2004.

In 1996, it was acquired by RailTex. RailTex was absorbed by RailAmerica in 2000, and RailAmerica was acquired by Genesee & Wyoming in December 2012.

As of 2023, there are many interchanges:

Ann Arbor Railroad (Diann, Michigan); Adrian and Blissfield Rail Road (Riga, Michigan); Chicago, Fort Wayne & Eastern Railroad (Lima, Ohio); Central Railroad of Indiana (Cincinnati, Ohio); Canadian National (Flat Rock, Michigan); CSX (Cincinnati, Ohio; Columbus, Ohio; Hamler, Ohio and Lima, Ohio); Norfolk Southern (Cincinnati, Ohio; Columbus, Ohio; Lima, Ohio; Sharonville, Ohio and Springfield, Ohio); Wheeling and Lake Erie Railway (Lima, Ohio).

== Fleet ==
As of July 2023, the I&O's roster consisted of the following, built by EMD and GE:

Model	Numbers	Built	Notes
GP38-2	2100-03, 2109, 2134, 3525, 3527, 3542–43	1972–1979	
SD60M	2369, 2388, 2400	1989–1990	Built with short hoods for UP.
GP40-2	3043	1969	
SD40-2	3321-23, 3313, 3472, 3488–94, 4023, 4030, 4071, 4082–83	1973–1980	
GP50	5007, 5012–5014	1980	
SD50	5016–5017, 5021	1983–1984	
SD50-2	8518, 8575, 8641	1983–1985	Ex-CSX SD50-2's leased from LTEX.
SD45R	9500	1966	Ex-Southern Pacific 7400
C40-8W	4087, 4089	1993	Ex-CSXT, Built for CR, purchased from GECX
C44-9W	4432, 4490, 4505, 4533, 4569, 4813, 4882	1999	Ex-BNSF, purchased from GECX
