= St. John's Lutheran Church and School =

Historic church in Indiana, United States

- U.S. National Register of Historic Places
- U.S. Historic district
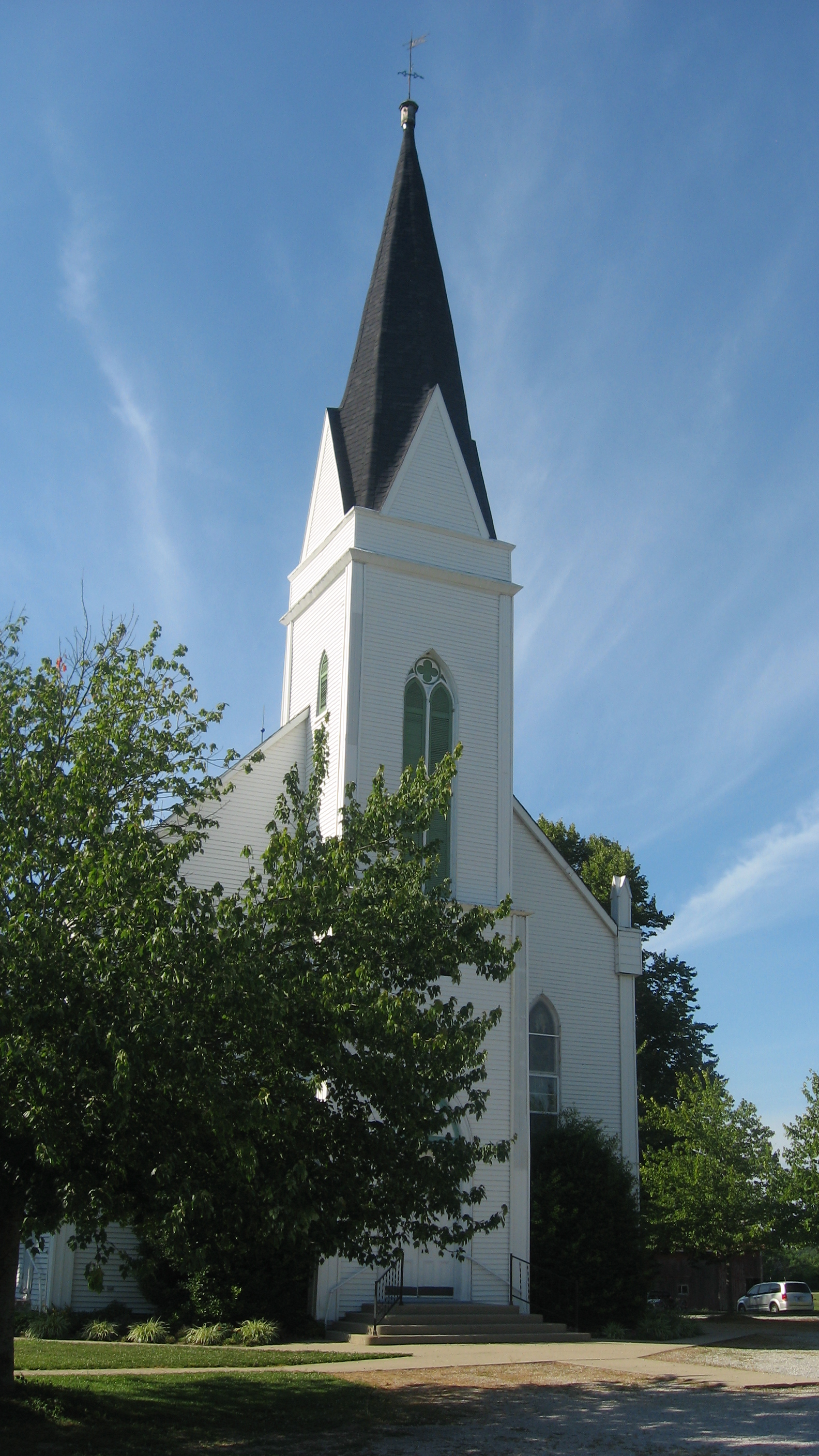

- Location within Indiana Location within the United States
- Location: 7291 State Road 62, southwest of Dillsboro
- Coordinates: 38°58′36″N 85°06′12″W
- Area: 22 acres (8.9 ha)
- Built: 1867
- Built by: Zernack, Julius
- Architectural style: Gothic Revival, Bungalow/craftsman
- NRHP reference No.: 96000289
- Added to NRHP: March 29, 1996

St. John's Lutheran Church is a congregation of the Lutheran Church–Missouri Synod. located in Caesar Creek Township, Dearborn County, Indiana. Organized in 1843, the congregation has about 300 baptized members.

The historic Gothic Revival style wood frame church (1867), teacherage (1874), school house (1888), two barns, bungalow style parsonage (1930), and school building (1950) constitute a national historic district. It was added to the National Register of Historic Places in 1996.
