= Hogan Township, Dearborn County, Indiana =

Hogan Township
- Township
- Location of Hogan Township in Dearborn County
- Coordinates: 39°03′45″N 84°58′37″W
- Country: United States
- State: Indiana
- County: Dearborn

Government
  - Type: Indiana township

Area
  - Total: 15.44 sq mi (40.0 km^{2})
  - Land: 15.38 sq mi (39.8 km^{2})
  - Water: 0.06 sq mi (0.16 km^{2})
- Elevation: 801 ft (244 m)

Population (2020)
  - Total: 1,194
  - Density: 76.6/sq mi (29.6/km^{2})
- FIPS code: 18-34222
- GNIS feature ID: 453415

Hogan Township is one of fourteen townships in Dearborn County, Indiana. As of the 2010 census, its population was 1,178 and it contained 474 housing units.

== History ==
Hogan Township was organized in 1852.

== Geography ==
According to the 2010 census, the township has a total area of 15.44 square miles (40.0 km^{2}), of which 15.38 square miles (39.8 km^{2}) (or 99.61%) is land and 0.06 square miles (0.16 km^{2}) (or 0.39%) is water.

=== Unincorporated towns ===
- Mount Sinai
- Wilmington

=== Major highways ===
- Indiana State Road 350

=== Cemeteries ===
The township contains one cemetery, Carbaugh.

== Education ==
Hogan Township residents may obtain a library card at the Aurora Public Library in Aurora.
