= New Alsace, Indiana =

New Alsace
- Unincorporated community
- Location within Dearborn County, Indiana
- Coordinates: 39°14′03″N 85°00′05″W
- Country: United States
- State: Indiana
- County: Dearborn
- Township: Kelso
- Elevation: 961 ft (293 m)
- ZIP code: 47041
- FIPS code: 18-52380
- GNIS feature ID: 440015

New Alsace is an unincorporated community in Kelso Township, Dearborn County, Indiana.

== History ==
New Alsace was laid out in 1838. It was named after Alsace, in France.

A post office was established at New Alsace in 1845, and remained in operation until it was discontinued in 1904.

== Notable people ==
- Joe Benz, Major League Baseball pitcher
