= Farmers Retreat, Indiana =

Farmers Retreat
- Unincorporated community
- Location within Dearborn County, Indiana
- Coordinates: 38°58′35″N 85°06′08″W
- Country: United States
- State: Indiana
- County: Dearborn
- Township: Caesar Creek
- Elevation: 876 ft (267 m)
- ZIP code: 47018
- FIPS code: 18-22756
- GNIS feature ID: 434404

Farmers Retreat is an unincorporated community in Caesar Creek Township, Dearborn County, Indiana.

== History ==
A post office was established at Farmers Retreat in 1852, and remained in operation until it was discontinued in 1925. The center of community life is St. John Lutheran Church (often called St. John's) which was founded in 1843. For many years it operated a school serving grades 1-8 where many of the residents of the community attended.

In the middle of the community is a grassy field that has been used as an airstrip by its owner, Barry Pruss, since the 1960s. Pruss Airport is designated by the FAA as 17IN.

Stories about the name of the community relate to Morgan's Raiders, a Confederate cavalry that traveled through this general area in 1863. One account says that farmers retreated to avoid possible conflict, and another says that farmers left home (either out of curiosity or prepared to engage in battle) but then went back home when Morgan did not show up.

Prior to that time, the community was known as Opptown.
