= Braysville, Indiana =

Braysville
- Unincorporated community
- Location within Dearborn County, Indiana
- Coordinates: 39°17′17″N 84°52′11″W
- Country: United States
- State: Indiana
- County: Dearborn
- Township: Harrison
- Elevation: 568 ft (173 m)
- ZIP code: 47060
- FIPS code: 18-07130
- GNIS feature ID: 431459

Braysville is an unincorporated community in Harrison Township, Dearborn County, Indiana.

== History ==
A post office was established at Braysville in 1853, and remained in operation until it was discontinued in 1861.
