= Sparta Township =

Sparta Township may refer to:

== Illinois ==
- Sparta Township, Knox County, Illinois

== Indiana ==
- Sparta Township, Dearborn County, Indiana
- Sparta Township, Noble County, Indiana

== Michigan ==
- Sparta Township, Michigan

== Minnesota ==
- Sparta Township, Minnesota

== Missouri ==
- Sparta Township, Christian County, Missouri, in Christian County, Missouri

== Nebraska ==
- Sparta Township, Knox County, Nebraska

== New Jersey ==
- Sparta Township, New Jersey

== Pennsylvania ==
- Sparta Township, Pennsylvania

== See also ==
- Sparta (disambiguation)
