= Miller Township, Dearborn County, Indiana =

Miller Township
- Township
- Location of Miller Township in Dearborn County
- Coordinates: 39°10′48″N 84°52′27″W
- Country: United States
- State: Indiana
- County: Dearborn

Government
  - Type: Indiana township

Area
  - Total: 26.37 sq mi (68.3 km^{2})
  - Land: 26.14 sq mi (67.7 km^{2})
  - Water: 0.23 sq mi (0.60 km^{2})
- Elevation: 568 ft (173 m)

Population (2020)
  - Total: 9,931
  - Density: 375.3/sq mi (144.9/km^{2})
- FIPS code: 18-49464
- GNIS feature ID: 453628

Miller Township is one of fourteen townships in Dearborn County, Indiana. As of the 2010 census, its population was 9,810 and it contained 3,651 housing units.

== History ==
Miller Township was organized in 1834.

== Geography ==
According to the 2010 census, the township has a total area of 26.37 square miles (68.3 km^{2}), of which 26.14 square miles (67.7 km^{2}) (or 99.13%) is land and 0.23 square miles (0.60 km^{2}) (or 0.87%) is water.

=== Cities and towns ===
- Bright (south half)
- Hidden Valley (vast majority)

=== Major highways ===
- Indiana State Road 1

=== Cemeteries ===
The township contains three cemeteries: Georgetown, Pelley and Sugar Ridge.
