= Lawrenceville, Indiana =

Lawrenceville
- Unincorporated community
- Location within Dearborn County, Indiana
- Coordinates: 39°16′40″N 85°02′22″W
- Country: United States
- State: Indiana
- County: Dearborn
- Township: Jackson
- Elevation: 968 ft (295 m)
- ZIP code: 47041
- FIPS code: 18-42534
- GNIS feature ID: 437677

Lawrenceville is an unincorporated community in Jackson Township, Dearborn County, Indiana.

== History ==
Lawrenceville was laid out in the 1830s. It was named for its founder, Jonathan Lawrence.

A post office was established at Lawrenceville in 1846, and remained in operation until it was discontinued in 1904.
