= Dearborn County Asylum for the Poor =

- U.S. National Register of Historic Places
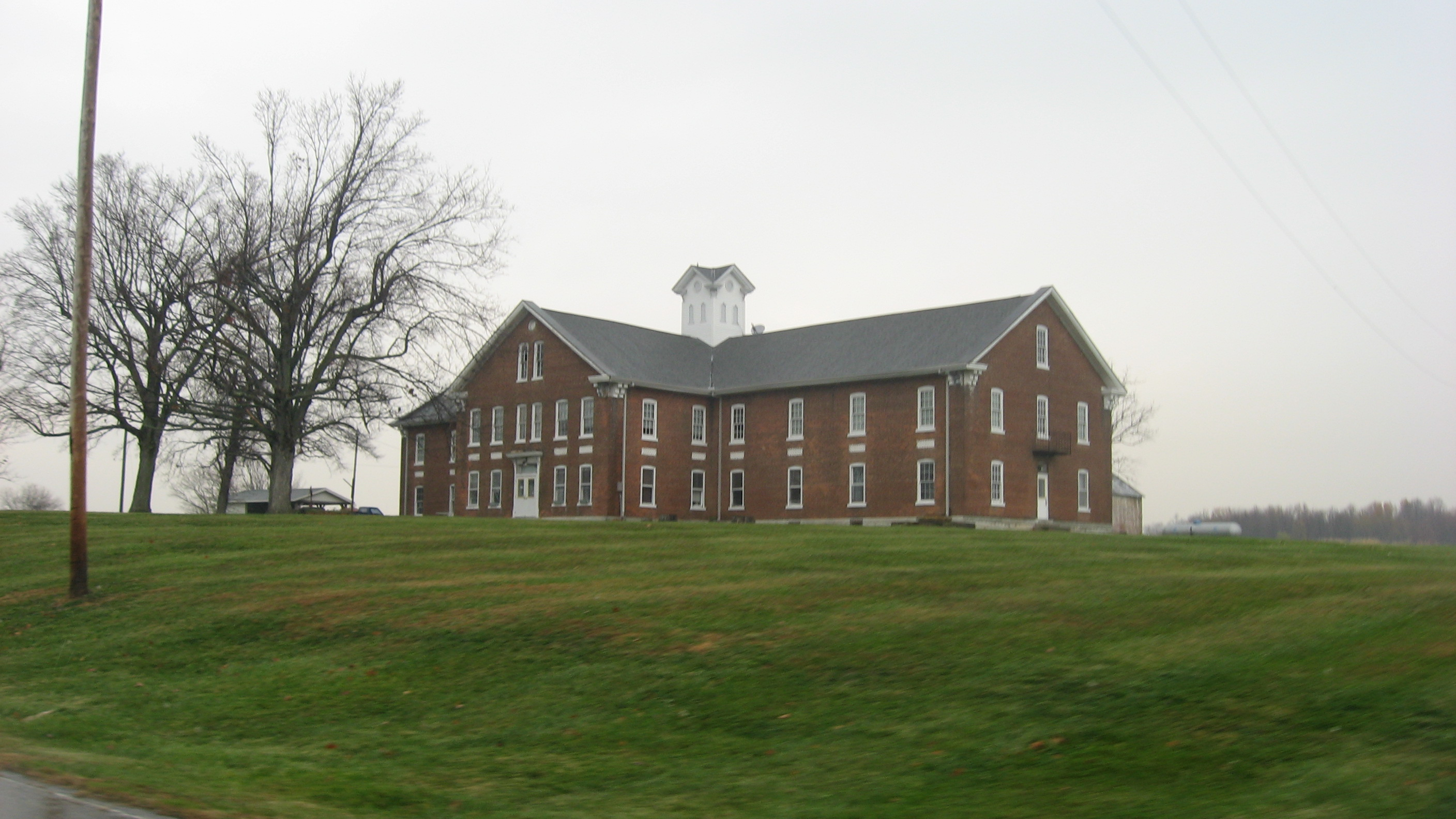
- Dearborn County Asylum for the Poor, November 2012

- Location within Indiana Location within the United States
- Location: 11636 County Farm Rd., northwest of Aurora, Manchester Township, Dearborn County, Indiana
- Coordinates: 39°9′1″N 85°2′3″W
- Area: 9 acres (3.6 ha)
- Built: 1882
- Built by: Platt, Seth
- Architect: Pattison, Alex B.
- Architectural style: Late Victorian
- NRHP reference No.: 00001143
- Added to NRHP: September 22, 2000

Dearborn County Asylum for the Poor, also known as the Dearborn County Home, is a historic poor house located in Manchester Township, Dearborn County, Indiana. It was built in 1882, and is a 2 1/2-story, cruciform plan, Late Victorian style brick building. It sits on a dressed limestone foundation and houses 64 rooms. Also on the property is a contributing smokehouse. The Asylum closed in 1980.

It was added to the National Register of Historic Places in 2000.
