= Kyle, Indiana =

Kyle
- Unincorporated community
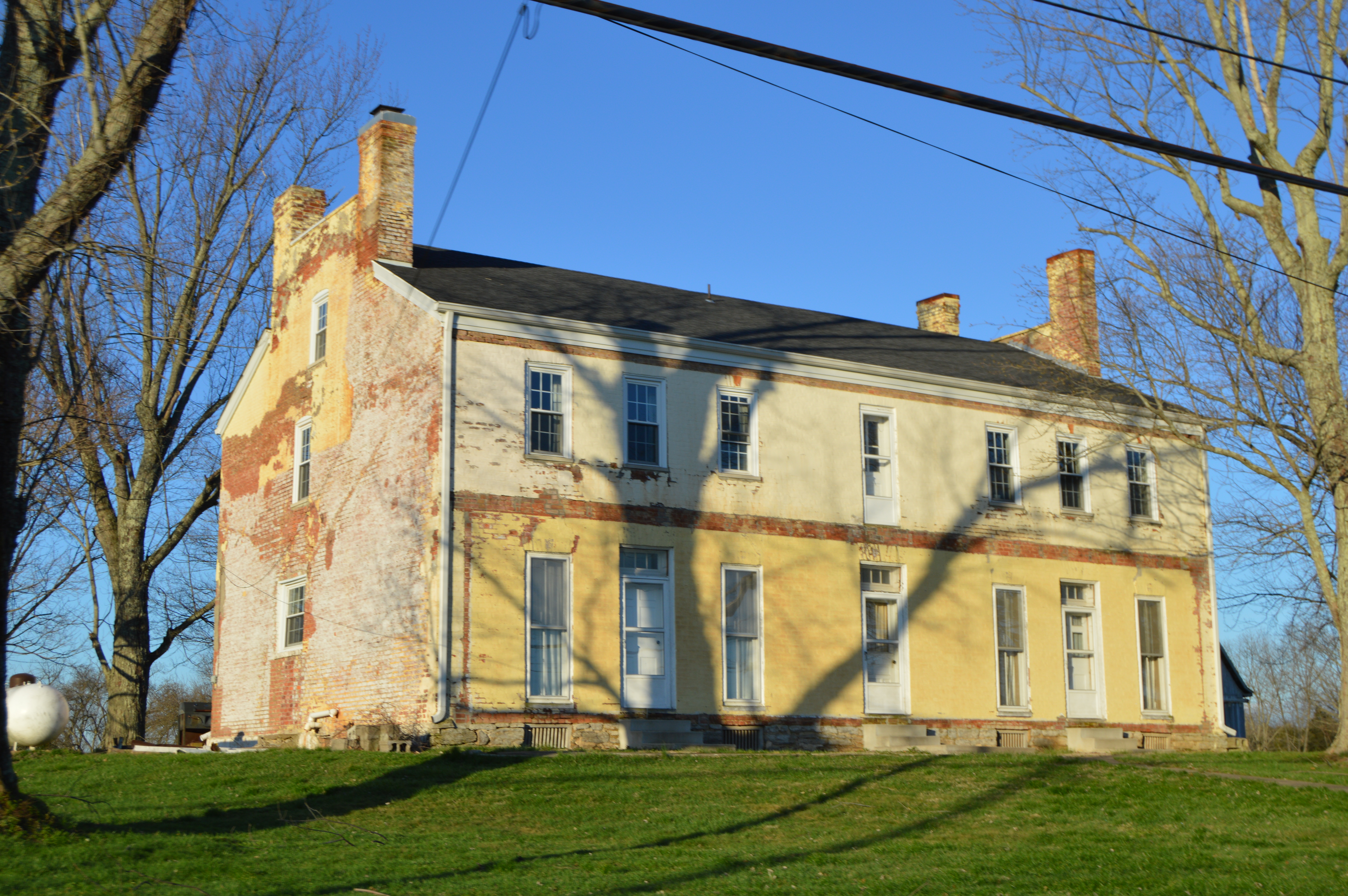
- W.H. Baker's Drovers Inn, built 1817

- Location within Dearborn County, Indiana
- Coordinates: 39°08′18″N 84°59′18″W
- Country: United States
- State: Indiana
- County: Dearborn
- Township: Manchester
- Elevation: 906 ft (276 m)
- ZIP code: 47001
- FIPS code: 18-40626
- GNIS feature ID: 437483

Kyle is an unincorporated community in Manchester Township, Dearborn County, Indiana.

== History ==
A post office was established at Kyle in 1883, and remained in operation until it was discontinued in 1904.
