= Cochran, Indiana =

Coordinates: 39°03′08″N 84°55′14″W

Cochran is a populated location in Dearborn County, Indiana, in the United States.

== History ==
A post office was established at Cochran in 1858, and remained in operation until it was discontinued in 1917. Cochran was named for its founder, George W. Cochran.
