= Wilmington, Indiana =

Wilmington
- Unincorporated community
- Location within Dearborn County, Indiana
- Coordinates: 39°03′45″N 84°56′48″W
- Country: United States
- State: Indiana
- County: Dearborn
- Township: Hogan
- Elevation: 797 ft (243 m)
- ZIP code: 47001
- FIPS code: 18-84572
- GNIS feature ID: 446116

Wilmington is an unincorporated community in Hogan Township, Dearborn County, Indiana.

== History ==
Wilmington was laid out in 1815. It was once the county seat.

A post office was established at Wilmington in 1817, and remained in operation until it was discontinued in 1907.
