= Logan Township, Dearborn County, Indiana =

Logan Township
- Township
- Location of Logan Township in Dearborn County
- Coordinates: 39°15′03″N 84°54′12″W
- Country: United States
- State: Indiana
- County: Dearborn

Government
  - Type: Indiana township

Area
  - Total: 17.88 sq mi (46.3 km^{2})
  - Land: 17.76 sq mi (46.0 km^{2})
  - Water: 0.12 sq mi (0.31 km^{2})
- Elevation: 925 ft (282 m)

Population (2020)
  - Total: 3,871
  - Density: 199.4/sq mi (77.0/km^{2})
- FIPS code: 18-44604
- GNIS feature ID: 453578

Logan Township is one of fourteen townships in Dearborn County, Indiana. As of the 2010 census, its population was 3,541 and it contained 1,290 housing units.

Logan Township took its name from Logan Creek.

== Geography ==
According to the 2010 census, the township has a total area of 17.88 square miles (46.3 km^{2}), of which 17.76 square miles (46.0 km^{2}) (or 99.33%) is land and 0.12 square miles (0.31 km^{2}) (or 0.67%) is water.

=== Cities and towns ===
- Bright (northwest quarter)

=== Unincorporated towns ===
- Logan

=== Major highways ===
- Interstate 74
- Indiana State Road 46

=== Cemeteries ===
The township contains one cemetery, Logan.
