= Spata (disambiguation) =

Spata may refer to:

- Spata, a town in eastern Attica, Greece
- Spata–Artemida, a municipality in eastern Attica, Greece
- Spata, Achaea, a settlement in the municipal unit Larissos, western Achaea, Greece
- Spata, a village in Bara Commune, Timiș County, Romania
- Spata family
