= Guilford, Indiana =

Guilford
- Unincorporated community
- Location within Dearborn County, Indiana
- Coordinates: 39°10′05″N 84°54′43″W
- Country: United States
- State: Indiana
- County: Dearborn
- Township: York
- Elevation: 499 ft (152 m)
- ZIP code: 47022
- GNIS feature ID: 435550

Guilford is an unincorporated community in York Township, Dearborn County, Indiana. Located at the forks of Tanners Creek the town was first platted in 1850 to take advantage of the fact that a railroad was soon to be built in the area. This made Guilford a prime spot for attracting farmers and merchants who wanted to ship their products.

== History ==
Guilford was laid out in 1850. The name might stem from Guildford, in England.

Guilford has the last remaining covered bridge in Dearborn County. Noted bridge builder Archibald M. Kennedy and Sons was hired by the County Commissioners in 1879 to construct the "latest in covered bridges". By 1961, the bridge was slated for replacement with a more durable concrete span. People of the county banded together to save the old structure, raising money and moving it to its present location. It is now the main attraction of the Guilford Covered Bridge Park located at the intersection of IN St Rt 1 and York Ridge.

== Notable residents ==
- Louis Ewbank, Justice of the Indiana Supreme Court
- Ora Haibe, Indy Car driver
