= Weisburg, Indiana =

Weisburg
- Unincorporated community
- Location within Dearborn County, Indiana
- Coordinates: 39°13′05″N 85°02′46″W
- Country: United States
- State: Indiana
- County: Dearborn
- Township: Jackson
- Elevation: 932 ft (284 m)
- ZIP code: 47041
- GNIS feature ID: 449744

Weisburg is an unincorporated community in Jackson Township, Dearborn County, Indiana.

== History ==
Weisburg was laid out in 1858. It was named for Philip Weis, a mill owner.
