= Manchester Township, Dearborn County, Indiana =

Manchester Township
- Township
- Location of Manchester Township in Dearborn County
- Coordinates: 39°08′53″N 85°00′40″W
- Country: United States
- State: Indiana
- County: Dearborn

Government
  - Type: Indiana township

Area
  - Total: 45.5 sq mi (118 km^{2})
  - Land: 45.48 sq mi (117.8 km^{2})
  - Water: 0.02 sq mi (0.052 km^{2})
- Elevation: 899 ft (274 m)

Population (2020)
  - Total: 3,297
  - Density: 70.7/sq mi (27.3/km^{2})
- FIPS code: 18-46368
- GNIS feature ID: 453601

Manchester Township is one of fourteen townships in Dearborn County, Indiana. As of the 2010 census, its population was 3,215 and it contained 1,233 housing units.

== History ==
The Dearborn County Asylum for the Poor was added to the National Register of Historic Places in 2000.

== Geography ==
According to the 2010 census, the township has a total area of 45.5 square miles (118 km^{2}), of which 45.48 square miles (117.8 km^{2}) (or 99.96%) is land and 0.02 square miles (0.052 km^{2}) (or 0.04%) is water.

=== Unincorporated towns ===
- Bonnell
- Kirschs Corner
- Kyle
- Manchester
- Wrights Corner

(This list is based on USGS data and may include former settlements.)

=== Major highways ===
- Indiana State Road 48
- Indiana State Road 148

=== Cemeteries ===
Manchester Township contains several cemeteries, most on private property and in disrepair. Many contain the remains of early area pioneers born in the 18th and 19th centuries.

Indian Mound •13999 Livingston Rd.

Green •North Side of Rumsey Rd.

Elam Road •Elam Rd.

Givan •13080 County Farm Rd.

Milburn •North Hogan Rd.

Tyrell •18323 Rumsey Rd.

Cook •North Hogan Rd.

Kyle Family •16046 Possum Ridge Rd.

Roberts Family •16684 Possum Ridge Rd.

Holman Crossroads •12651 North Hogan Rd.

Luther Plumer •8688 State Route 48

Miliken •21106 Quail Ridge Ln.

Aiken •Possum Ridge Rd. near Karst Rd.

Busse •Ester Ridge Rd.

Cundale Family Burial Ground •Possum Ridge Rd.

Ebenezer Baptist Church •16393 State Route 148

Freeman •10998 County Farm Rd.

Hathaway •20485 North Hogan Rd.

Hogan Hill Baptist •13298 North Hogan Rd.

Horham •20998 Konradi Rd.

Johnston Family •North Hogan Rd.

Lowes •Hogan Creek Rd.

Manchester •Union Ridge Rd.

McKinstry •Hogan Creek Rd., west of Chapin Rd.

Mendel •Off Stinson Rd.

Old Hogan Hill •Hogan Hill Rd.

Platt •North Manchester Rd.

Platt •19006 Platt Rd.

Second Manchester Baptist •South side of State Route 48 near Burns Rd.

Simms •North Hogan Rd.

Tibbets •Platt Rd.

Emerson •6291 Kaiser Dr.

Ellis •11940 Rumsey Rd.

Wrights Corner Methodist Episcopal Church •7435 State Route 48

Bears •North Hogan Rd.

Lowes (#2) •Location Unknown

Barton •11469 County Farm Rd.

Dearborn County Home (original) •11529 County Farm Rd.

Dearborn County Home (new) •11529 County Farm Rd.

Zion Lutheran Church •10629 State Route 48

Zion Methodist •State Route 48

== Education ==
Manchester Township residents may obtain a library card at the Aurora Public Library in Aurora.
