= Mount Sinai, Indiana =

Mount Sinai
- Unincorporated community
- Location within Dearborn County, Indiana
- Coordinates: 39°04′55″N 85°00′02″W
- Country: United States
- State: Indiana
- County: Dearborn
- Township: Hogan
- Elevation: 873 ft (266 m)
- ZIP code: 47032
- FIPS code: 18-51660
- GNIS feature ID: 439695

Mount Sinai is an unincorporated community in Hogan Township, Dearborn County, Indiana.

== History ==
Mount Sinai took its name from Mount Sinai Methodist Episcopal Church. The namesake church was completed in about 1835, and has since been torn down.
