= Yorkville, Indiana =

Yorkville
- Unincorporated community
- Location within Dearborn County, Indiana
- Coordinates: 39°12′16″N 84°58′03″W
- Country: United States
- State: Indiana
- County: Dearborn
- Township: York
- Elevation: 932 ft (284 m)
- ZIP code: 47022
- FIPS code: 18-86102
- GNIS feature ID: 446407

Yorkville is an unincorporated community in York Township, Dearborn County, Indiana.

== History ==
Yorkville was laid out in 1841. It took its name from York Township.

Yorkville contained a post office between 1845 and 1955.

== Services ==
The church in Yorkville is named St. Martin's, named after Saint Martin. It was founded in 1850
