= Logan, Dearborn County, Indiana =

Logan
- Unincorporated community
- Location within Dearborn County, Indiana
- Coordinates: 39°14′53″N 84°53′41″W
- Country: United States
- State: Indiana
- County: Dearborn
- Township: Logan
- Elevation: 922 ft (281 m)
- ZIP code: 47022
- FIPS code: 18-44586
- GNIS feature ID: 438224

Logan is an unincorporated community in Logan Township, Dearborn County, Indiana.

== History ==
A post office was established at Logan in 1836, and remained in operation until it was discontinued in 1927. The community took its name from Logan Township.
