= Cold Springs, Indiana =

Cold Springs
- Unincorporated community
- Location within Dearborn County, Indiana
- Coordinates: 39°04′17″N 85°04′23″W
- Country: United States
- State: Indiana
- County: Dearborn
- Township: Sparta
- Elevation: 787 ft (240 m)
- ZIP code: 47032
- FIPS code: 18-14230
- GNIS feature ID: 449642

Cold Springs is an unincorporated community in Sparta Township, Dearborn County, in the U.S. state of Indiana.

== History ==
Cold Springs was a station and shipping point on the Baltimore & Ohio Railroad.
