= Lawrenceburg Township, Dearborn County, Indiana =

Lawrenceburg Township
- Township
- Location of Lawrenceburg Township in Dearborn County
- Coordinates: 39°07′03″N 84°52′15″W
- Country: United States
- State: Indiana
- County: Dearborn

Government
  - Type: Indiana township

Area
  - Total: 24.31 sq mi (63.0 km^{2})
  - Land: 23.46 sq mi (60.8 km^{2})
  - Water: 0.85 sq mi (2.2 km^{2})
- Elevation: 456 ft (139 m)

Population (2020)
  - Total: 11,258
  - Density: 468.3/sq mi (180.8/km^{2})
- FIPS code: 18-42480
- GNIS feature ID: 453546

Lawrenceburg Township is one of fourteen townships in Dearborn County, Indiana. As of the 2010 census, its population was 10,985 and it contained 4,796 housing units.

== Geography ==
According to the 2010 census, the township has a total area of 24.31 square miles (63.0 km^{2}), of which 23.46 square miles (60.8 km^{2}) (or 96.50%) is land and 0.85 square miles (2.2 km^{2}) (or 3.50%) is water. Old Channel Lake and Twin Lakes are in this township.

=== Cities and towns ===
- Aurora (north edge)
- Greendale
- Hidden Valley (south edge)
- Lawrenceburg

=== Unincorporated towns ===
- Hardinsburg
- Homestead
- Oldtown

(This list is based on USGS data and may include former settlements.)

=== Major highways ===
- Interstate 275
- U.S. Route 50
- State Road 1
- State Road 48

=== Cemeteries ===
The township contains three cemeteries: Greendale, Guard and Miller.

== See also ==
- Whitewater Canal
