= Sparta, Indiana =

Sparta
- Unincorporated community
- Location within Dearborn County, Indiana
- Coordinates: 39°06′19″N 85°02′43″W
- Country: United States
- State: Indiana
- County: Dearborn
- Township: Sparta
- Elevation: 919 ft (280 m)
- ZIP code: 47032
- GNIS feature ID: 443917

Sparta is an unincorporated community in Sparta Township, Dearborn County, Indiana.

== History ==
A post office was established at Sparta in 1846, and remained in operation until it was discontinued in 1904. Sparta took its name from Sparta Township.

Sparta's progress in the 1840s was checked by an outbreak of cholera. The community has two churches, Sparta First Baptist Church and South Sparta Church. South Sparta Church started as Cold Springs Presbyterian Church and was built in 1889. South Sparta Church currently has church services once a month.
