= Spades, Indiana =

- Unincorporated community
- Location within Indiana Location within the United States
- Coordinates: 39°15′16″N 85°07′24″W
- Country: United States
- State: Indiana
- County: Ripley
- Township: Adams
- Elevation: 1,020 ft (310 m)
- Time zone: UTC-5 (Eastern (EST))
  - Summer (DST): UTC-4 (EDT)
- ZIP code: 47041
- Area codes: 812, 930
- GNIS feature ID: 443903

Spades is an unincorporated community in Adams Township, Ripley County, in the U.S. state of Indiana.

== History ==
Spades was laid out in 1855. The community's name honors Jacob Spade, a first settler. An early variant name of the community was Spades Depot.

A post office was established as Spade's Depot in 1855, the name was shortened to Spades in 1883, and the post office closed in 1950.
