= Morris, Indiana =

- Unincorporated community and Census-designated place
- Location within Indiana Location within the United States
- Coordinates: 39°16′55″N 85°10′14″W
- Country: United States
- State: Indiana
- County: Ripley
- Township: Adams
- Elevation: 991 ft (302 m)
- ZIP code: 47006
- Area codes: 812, 930
- FIPS code: 18-51174
- GNIS feature ID: 2830514

Morris is an unincorporated community in Adams Township, Ripley County, in the U.S. state of Indiana.

== History ==
Morris was originally called Springdale, and under the latter name was first settled about 1840 by a colony of German Catholics. The name was changed to Morris in 1856. A post office called Morris has been in operation since 1858. The center of community life is St. Anthony of Padua Catholic Church which was founded in 1856 and which is, as of February 2025, the scene of an investigation into a possible eucharistic miracle. The church also built a grade school in 1861 where many of the residents of the community attended until the school closed down in 1977.

== Demographics ==
The United States Census Bureau defined Morris as a census designated place in the 2022 American Community Survey.
