= Hubbells Corner, Indiana =

Unincorporated community in Indiana, US

Coordinates: 39°14′04″N 85°02′24″W

Hubbells Corner is an unincorporated community in Dearborn County, Indiana, in the United States.

== History ==
Hubbells Corner was named for Merritt Hubbell, a merchant.
