= Dearborn County, Indiana =

County in Indiana, United States

- County
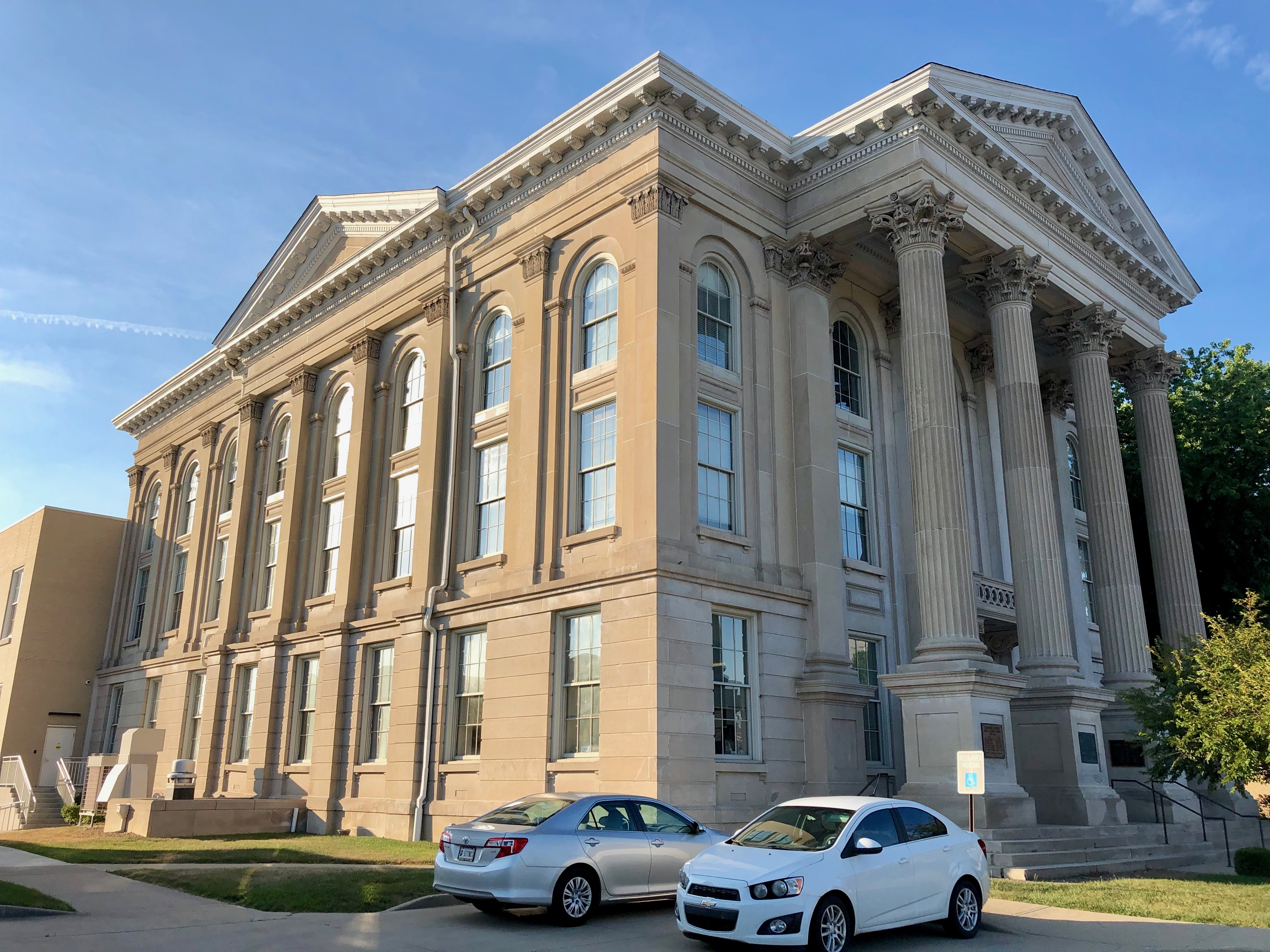
- Dearborn County Courthouse

- Location within the U.S. state of Indiana
- Coordinates: 39°09′N 84°59′W
- Country: United States
- State: Indiana
- Founded: 1803
- Named for: Dr. Henry Dearborn
- Seat: Lawrenceburg
- Largest city: Lawrenceburg

Area
  - Total: 307.42 sq mi (796.2 km^{2})
  - Land: 305.03 sq mi (790.0 km^{2})
  - Water: 2.38 sq mi (6.2 km^{2}) 0.77%

Population (2020)
  - Total: 50,679
  - Estimate (2025): 51,609 ▲
  - Density: 166.14/sq mi (64.149/km^{2})
- Demonym: Dearbornian
- Time zone: UTC−5 (Eastern)
  - Summer (DST): UTC−4 (EDT)
- Congressional district: 9th
- Website: www.dearborncounty.org
- Indiana county number 15

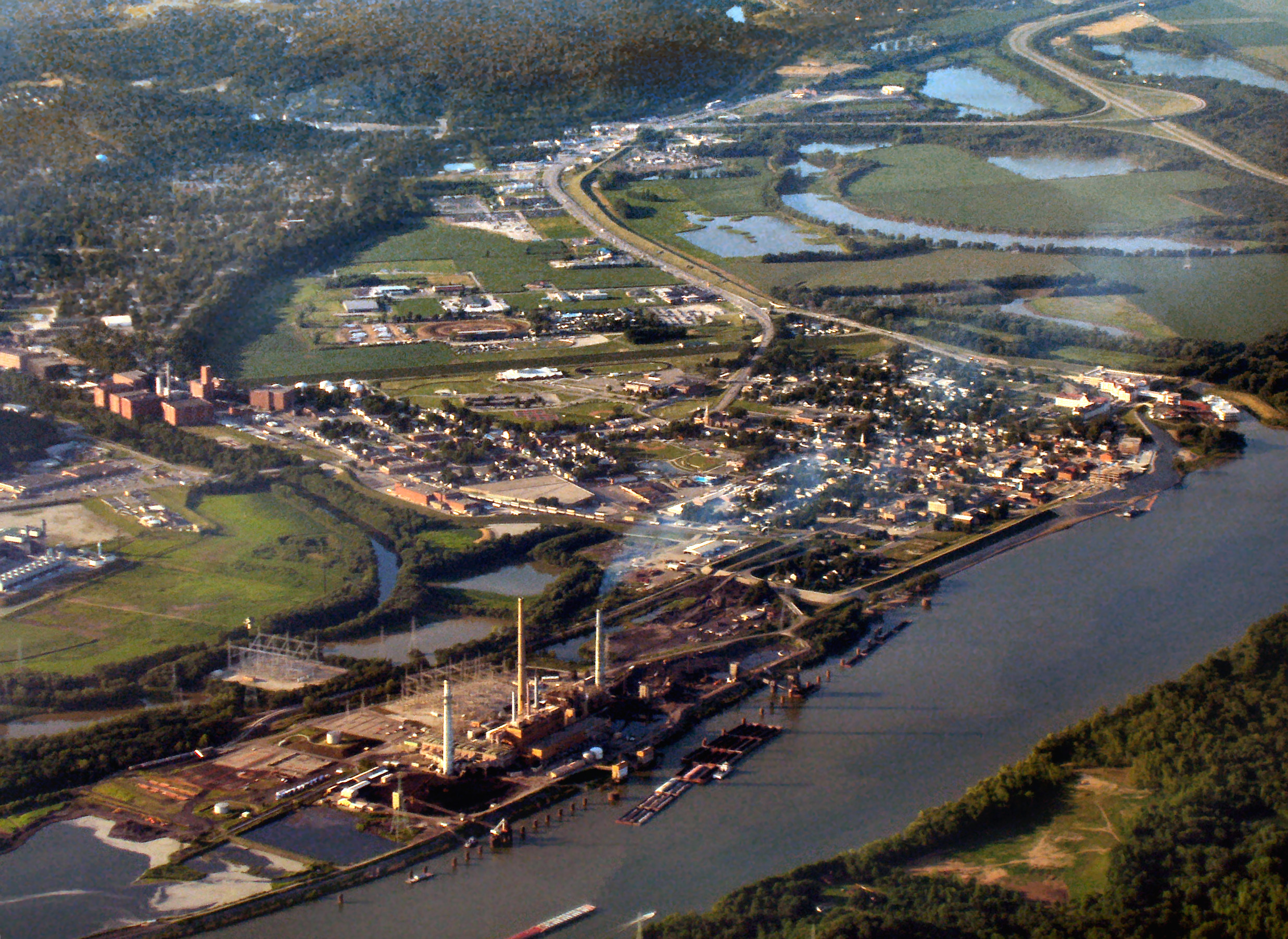
Lawrenceburg on the Ohio River, from the air. AEP's Tanner's Creek Generating Station at lower-left.

Dearborn County is one of 92 counties of the U.S. state of Indiana. Located on the Ohio border near the southeast corner of the state, Dearborn County was formed in 1803 from a portion of Hamilton County, Ohio. In 2020, the population was 50,679. The county seat and largest city is Lawrenceburg. Dearborn County is part of the Cincinnati, OH-KY-IN Metropolitan Statistical Area.

== History ==
In 1803, following Ohio's admission to the Union, a wedge, or pie shaped, remnant of the former Northwest Territory along Ohio's southwestern border was ceded to Indiana Territory and organized as Dearborn County. It was named after Henry Dearborn who was U.S. Secretary of War at that time. Lawrenceburg was then designated as the county seat.

All or part of seven other present day counties were carved from the original county with the present boundaries being established in 1845. The region, nicknamed the "Gore", slices through the present-day counties of Dearborn, Franklin, Ohio, Randolph, Switzerland, Union, Wayne and Fayette. Subdivision of Dearborn County began in 1811 with the formation of Franklin and Wayne Counties, followed by Switzerland in 1814.

Early growth in the region was centered on Lawrenceburg which became an important railroad junction connecting two of the regions major rail lines. A contention existed between the towns of Lawrenceburg and the mostly German-speaking immigrants that dominated Rising Sun over the favored status of Lawrenceburg as the county seat. The rivalry between the two towns was resolved in 1844 when the Indiana State legislature separated the portion of Dearborn County south of Laughery Creek and created the last and smallest Indiana county, county of Ohio on March 1, 1844, with Rising Sun designated as its county seat.

== Geography ==
According to the 2010 census, the county has a total area of 307.42 square miles (796.2 km^{2}), of which 305.03 square miles (790.0 km^{2}) (or 99.22%) is land and 2.38 square miles (6.2 km^{2}) (or 0.77%) is water. Part of the southeastern county line is formed by the Ohio River.

=== Cities ===
- Aurora
- Lawrenceburg
- Greendale

=== Towns ===
- Dillsboro
- Moores Hill
- Saint Leon
- West Harrison

=== Census-designated places ===
- Bright
- Hidden Valley

=== Other unincorporated communities ===
- Bonnell
- Braysville
- Chesterville
- Cochran
- Cold Springs
- Dover
- Farmers Retreat
- Guilford
- Hardinsburg
- Hubbells Corner
- Kyle
- Lawrenceville
- Logan
- Manchester
- Mount Sinai
- New Alsace
- Sparta
- Weisburg
- Wilmington
- Wrights Corner
- Yorkville

=== Townships ===
- Caesar Creek
- Center
- Clay
- Harrison
- Hogan
- Jackson
- Kelso
- Lawrenceburg
- Logan
- Manchester
- Miller
- Sparta
- Washington
- York

=== Adjacent counties ===
- Franklin County (north)
- Butler County, Ohio (northeast)
- Hamilton County, Ohio (east)
- Boone County, Kentucky (southeast)
- Ohio County (south)
- Ripley County (west)

=== Climate ===
In recent years, average temperatures in Lawrenceburg have ranged from a low of 21 °F (−6 °C) in January to a high of 86 °F (30 °C) in July, although a record low of −27 °F (−33 °C) was recorded in January 1994 and a record high of 107 °F (42 °C) was recorded in July 1988. Average monthly precipitation ranged from 2.94 inches (75 mm) in September to 5.53 inches (140 mm) in May.

Lawrenceburg, Indiana

Climate chart (precipitation, max. and min. temperature)
J	F	M	A	M	J	J	A	S	O	N	D
3.5 38 21	3 44 24	4.4 54 31	4.4 64 39	5.5 74 49	4.6 82 58	4.6 86 63	4 85 62	2.9 79 55	3.2 67 43	3.8 55 35	3.7 43 26
- █ Average max. and min. temperatures in °F
- █ Precipitation totals in inches
- Source: The Weather Channel
Metric conversion
J	F	M	A	M	J	J	A	S	O	N	D
89 3 −6	77 7 −4	111 12 −1	112 18 4	140 23 9	117 28 14	116 30 17	100 29 17	75 26 13	80 19 6	97 13 2	93 6 −3
- █ Average max. and min. temperatures in °C
- █ Precipitation totals in mm

== Demographics ==
Historical population
Census	Pop.	Note	%±
1810	7,310		—
1820	11,468		56.9%
1830	13,974		21.9%
1840	19,327		38.3%
1850	20,166		4.3%
1860	24,406		21.0%
1870	24,116		−1.2%
1880	26,671		10.6%
1890	23,364		−12.4%
1900	22,194		−5.0%
1910	21,396		−3.6%
1920	20,033		−6.4%
1930	21,056		5.1%
1940	23,053		9.5%
1950	25,141		9.1%
1960	28,674		14.1%
1970	29,430		2.6%
1980	34,291		16.5%
1990	38,835		13.3%
2000	46,109		18.7%
2010	50,047		8.5%
2020	50,679		1.3%
2025 (est.)	51,609	▲	1.8%
U.S. Decennial Census; 1790-1960 1900-1990; 1990-2000 2010-2013

=== Racial and ethnic composition ===
Dearborn County, Indiana – Racial and ethnic composition Note: the US Census treats Hispanic/Latino as an ethnic category. This table excludes Latinos from the racial categories and assigns them to a separate category. Hispanics/Latinos may be of any race.
Race / Ethnicity (NH = Non-Hispanic)	Pop 1980	Pop 1990	Pop 2000	Pop 2010	Pop 2020	% 1980	% 1990	% 2000	% 2010	% 2020
White alone (NH)	33,823	38,339	45,048	48,486	47,319	98.64%	98.72%	97.70%	96.88%	93.37%
Black or African American alone (NH)	225	250	285	291	292	0.66%	0.64%	0.62%	0.58%	0.58%
Native American or Alaska Native alone (NH)	27	49	68	79	66	0.08%	0.13%	0.15%	0.16%	0.13%
Asian alone (NH)	79	69	122	187	211	0.23%	0.18%	0.26%	0.37%	0.42%
Native Hawaiian or Pacific Islander alone (NH)	x	x	11	24	9	x	x	0.02%	0.05%	0.02%
Other race alone (NH)	9	3	23	50	162	0.03%	0.01%	0.05%	0.10%	0.32%
Mixed race or Multiracial (NH)	x	x	286	428	1,896	x	x	0.62%	0.86%	3.74%
Hispanic or Latino (any race)	128	125	266	502	724	0.37%	0.32%	0.58%	1.00%	1.43%
Total	34,291	38,835	46,109	50,047	50,679	100.00%	100.00%	100.00%	100.00%	100.00%

=== 2020 census ===
As of the 2020 census, the county had a population of 50,679. The median age was 42.5 years. 22.3% of residents were under the age of 18 and 18.4% of residents were 65 years of age or older. For every 100 females there were 99.7 males, and for every 100 females age 18 and over there were 97.7 males age 18 and over.

The racial makeup of the county was 93.9% White, 0.6% Black or African American, 0.2% American Indian and Alaska Native, 0.4% Asian, <0.1% Native Hawaiian and Pacific Islander, 0.7% from some other race, and 4.3% from two or more races. Hispanic or Latino residents of any race comprised 1.4% of the population.

39.8% of residents lived in urban areas, while 60.2% lived in rural areas.

There were 19,562 households in the county, of which 30.7% had children under the age of 18 living in them. Of all households, 55.0% were married-couple households, 16.5% were households with a male householder and no spouse or partner present, and 21.0% were households with a female householder and no spouse or partner present. About 24.0% of all households were made up of individuals and 11.1% had someone living alone who was 65 years of age or older.

There were 20,845 housing units, of which 6.2% were vacant. Among occupied housing units, 80.0% were owner-occupied and 20.0% were renter-occupied. The homeowner vacancy rate was 1.0% and the rental vacancy rate was 4.8%.

=== 2010 census ===
At the 2010 United States census, there were 50,047 people, 18,743 households and 13,773 families residing in the county. The population density was 164.1 inhabitants per square mile (63.4/km^{2}). There were 20,171 housing units at an average density of 66.1 per square mile (25.5/km^{2}). The racial makeup of the county was 97.5% white, 0.6% black or African American, 0.4% Asian, 0.2% American Indian, 0.1% Pacific islander, 0.3% from other races, and 1.0% from two or more races. Those of Hispanic or Latino origin made up 1.0% of the population. In terms of ancestry, 46.5% were German, 19.2% were Irish, 11.4% were English, and 7.8% were American.

Of the 18,743 households, 35.1% had children under the age of 18 living with them, 58.5% were married couples living together, 10.0% had a female householder with no husband present, 26.5% were non-families, and 22.0% of all households were made up of individuals. The average household size was 2.64 and the average family size was 3.07. The median age was 40.0 years.

The median household income was $47,697 and the median family income was $66,561. Males had a median income of $45,270 and females $33,353. The per capita income was $25,023. About 4.5% of families and 7.2% of the population were below the poverty line, including 8.5% of those under age 18 and 6.3% of those age 65 or over.

== Government ==
The county government is a constitutional body, and is granted specific powers by the Constitution of Indiana, and by the Indiana Code.

County Council: The county council is the legislative branch of the county government and controls all the spending and revenue collection in the county. Representatives are elected from county districts. The council members serve four-year terms. They are responsible for setting salaries, the annual budget, and special spending. The council also has limited authority to impose local taxes, in the form of an income and property tax that is subject to state level approval, excise taxes, and service taxes. Board of Commissioners: The executive body of the county is made of a board of commissioners. The commissioners are elected county-wide, in staggered terms, and each serves a four-year term. One of the commissioners, typically the most senior, serves as president. The commissioners are charged with executing the acts legislated by the council, collecting revenue, and managing the day-to-day functions of the county government.

Court: Dearborn County's courts consist of a Circuit Court, presided over by the Honorable James Humphrey (shared with Ohio County in the only such arrangement in the state) and two Superior Courts, the Honorable Jonathan Cleary, presiding over Dearborn County Superior Court No. 1 and the Honorable Sally McLaughlin, presiding over Dearborn County z Superior Court No. 2. Judges are elected to six-year terms. Lawrenceburg also has City Courts, presided over by the Honorable Joseph R. Johns. The Lawrenceburg City Court Judge serves a four-year term.

County Officials: The county has several other elected offices, including sheriff, prosecuting attorney, coroner, auditor, treasurer, recorder, surveyor, and circuit court clerk. Each of these elected officers serves a term of four years and oversees a different part of county government. Members elected to county government positions are required to declare a party affiliation and to be residents of the county.

Dearborn County is part of Indiana's 6th congressional district; Indiana Senate district 43; and Indiana House of Representatives districts 55 and 68.

United States presidential election results for Dearborn County, Indiana
Year	Republican		Democratic		Third party(ies)	
Year	No.	%	No.	%	No.	%
1888	2,648	42.25%	3,531	56.33%	89	1.42%
1892	2,274	39.20%	3,397	58.56%	130	2.24%
1896	2,714	44.75%	3,313	54.62%	38	0.63%
1900	2,533	42.00%	3,371	55.89%	127	2.11%
1904	2,588	42.99%	3,264	54.22%	168	2.79%
1908	2,520	41.81%	3,365	55.83%	142	2.36%
1912	1,366	25.93%	2,957	56.13%	945	17.94%
1916	2,318	42.18%	3,010	54.78%	167	3.04%
1920	5,159	50.66%	4,884	47.96%	140	1.37%
1924	4,588	48.11%	4,330	45.41%	618	6.48%
1928	6,334	58.49%	4,459	41.18%	36	0.33%
1932	4,716	41.83%	6,429	57.02%	130	1.15%
1936	4,669	41.48%	6,366	56.56%	221	1.96%
1940	5,908	49.29%	6,038	50.37%	41	0.34%
1944	5,487	51.32%	5,157	48.24%	47	0.44%
1948	5,353	46.70%	6,040	52.70%	69	0.60%
1952	7,091	54.82%	5,810	44.92%	33	0.26%
1956	7,189	56.40%	5,535	43.43%	22	0.17%
1960	7,619	54.99%	6,216	44.87%	19	0.14%
1964	5,473	41.47%	7,699	58.33%	26	0.20%
1968	6,208	48.65%	4,842	37.95%	1,710	13.40%
1972	7,689	64.69%	4,137	34.81%	59	0.50%
1976	6,176	49.04%	6,348	50.40%	71	0.56%
1980	7,467	56.36%	5,135	38.76%	647	4.88%
1984	9,149	64.74%	4,920	34.81%	63	0.45%
1988	8,195	61.57%	5,066	38.06%	48	0.36%
1992	6,974	44.80%	5,116	32.86%	3,477	22.34%
1996	8,318	50.60%	6,269	38.13%	1,852	11.27%
2000	11,452	64.88%	6,020	34.11%	178	1.01%
2004	14,231	67.87%	6,596	31.46%	142	0.68%
2008	14,886	67.00%	7,123	32.06%	208	0.94%
2012	15,394	68.86%	6,528	29.20%	434	1.94%
2016	18,113	75.06%	4,883	20.24%	1,135	4.70%
2020	19,528	76.78%	5,446	21.41%	460	1.81%
2024	20,844	78.36%	5,335	20.06%	421	1.58%

== Infrastructure ==
=== Major highways ===
- Interstate 74
- Interstate 275
- U.S. Route 50
- U.S. Route 52
- State Road 1
- State Road 46
- State Road 48
- State Road 56
- State Road 62
- State Road 148
- State Road 262
- State Road 350

== Notable people ==
- Erwin "Cannonball" Baker, motorcycle and auto racer, 1989 inductee in Motorsports Hall of Fame of America
- Nick Goepper professional slopestyle skier, three-time winter Olympic medalist
- Jim Lyttle, professional baseball player
- Lonnie Mack, influential guitar soloist of early rock 'n' roll
- Louis Skidmore, architect that co-founded Skidmore, Owings & Merrill
- John Whiteaker, first state governor of Oregon from 1859 until 1862 and Oregon's congressman from 1879 to 1881

== See also ==
- National Register of Historic Places listings in Dearborn County, Indiana
