= Wrights Corner, Indiana =

Wrights Corner
- Unincorporated community
- Location within Dearborn County, Indiana
- Coordinates: 39°08′08″N 84°57′26″W
- Country: United States
- State: Indiana
- County: Dearborn
- Township: Manchester
- Elevation: 902 ft (275 m)
- ZIP code: 47022
- FIPS code: 18-85670
- GNIS feature ID: 449749

Wrights Corner is an unincorporated community in Manchester Township, Dearborn County, Indiana, United States.

== History ==
A post office was established at Wrights Corner in 1853, and remained in operation until it was discontinued in 1903. Wrights Corner was named for Washington Wright, who kept a store and served as the postmaster.
