= Hardinsburg, Dearborn County, Indiana =

Hardinsburg
- Unincorporated community
- Location within Dearborn County, Indiana
- Coordinates: 39°07′19″N 84°50′51″W
- Country: United States
- State: Indiana
- County: Dearborn
- Township: Lawrenceburg
- Elevation: 482 ft (147 m)
- ZIP code: 47025
- FIPS code: 18-31378
- GNIS feature ID: 435732

Hardinsburg is an unincorporated community in Lawrenceburg Township, Dearborn County, Indiana.

== History ==
Hardinsburg was laid out in 1815. It was named after Henry Hardin, the original owner of the town site. A post office was established at Hardinsburg in 1820, and remained in operation until it was discontinued in 1836.
