= Sunman, Indiana =

- Town
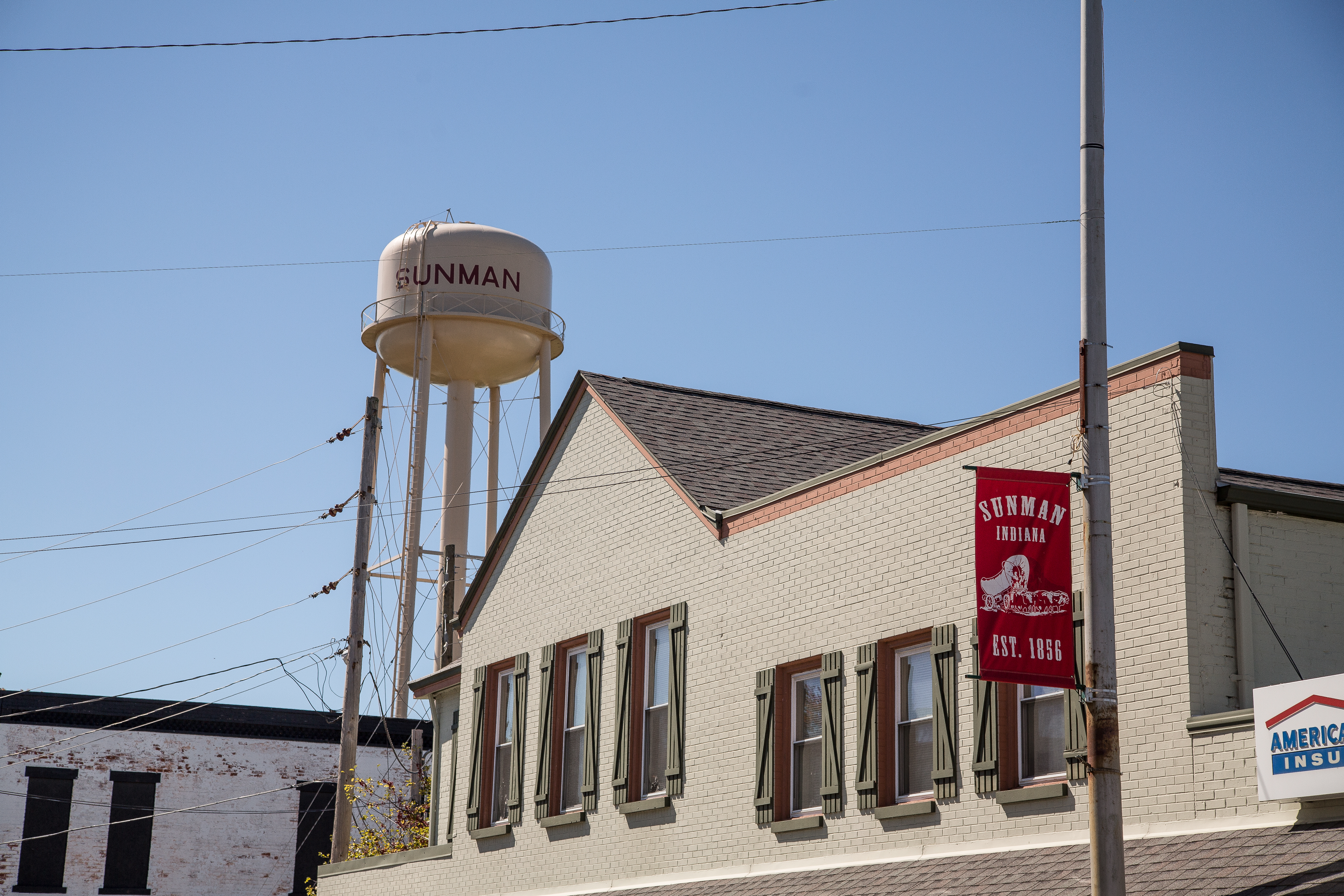

- Seal

- Location of Sunman in Ripley County, Indiana.
- Coordinates: 39°14′41″N 85°05′42″W
- Country: United States
- State: Indiana
- County: Ripley
- Township: Adams

Area
  - Total: 1.17 sq mi (3.03 km^{2})
  - Land: 1.17 sq mi (3.03 km^{2})
  - Water: 0 sq mi (0.00 km^{2})
- Elevation: 1,017 ft (310 m)

Population (2020)
  - Total: 914
  - Density: 781.5/sq mi (301.74/km^{2})
- Time zone: UTC-5 (Eastern (EST))
  - Summer (DST): UTC-4 (EDT)
- ZIP code: 47041
- Area code: 812
- FIPS code: 18-74168
- GNIS feature ID: 2397689
- Website: www.townofsunman.org

Sunman is a town in Adams Township, Ripley County, in the U.S. state of Indiana. The population was 914 at the 2020 census.

== History ==
A post office has been in operation at Sunman since 1833. John Sunman, an early postmaster, gave the place his name. Sunman began as a town in 1856 when the railroad was extended to that point.

== Geography ==
According to the 2010 census, Sunman has a total area of 1.17 square miles (3.03 km^{2}), all land.

=== Climate ===
The climate in this area is characterized by hot, humid summers and generally mild to cool winters. According to the Köppen Climate Classification system, Sunman has a humid subtropical climate, abbreviated "Cfa" on climate maps.

== Demographics ==
Historical population
| Census | Pop. | Note | %± |
|---|---|---|---|
| 1900 | 370 | | — |
| 1910 | 353 | | −4.6% |
| 1920 | 372 | | 5.4% |
| 1930 | 355 | | −4.6% |
| 1940 | 352 | | −0.8% |
| 1950 | 358 | | 1.7% |
| 1960 | 446 | | 24.6% |
| 1970 | 707 | | 58.5% |
| 1980 | 924 | | 30.7% |
| 1990 | 623 | | −32.6% |
| 2000 | 805 | | 29.2% |
| 2010 | 1,049 | | 30.3% |
| 2020 | 914 | | −12.9% |
U.S. Decennial Census

=== 2010 census ===
At the 2010 census, there were 1,049 people, 371 households and 272 families living in the town. The population density was 896.6 per square mile (346.2/km^{2}). There were 413 housing units at an average density of 353.0 per square mile (136.3/km^{2}). The racial make-up of the town was 95.1% White, 0.6% African American, 0.2% Asian, 2.7% from other races and 1.4% from two or more races. Hispanic or Latino of any race were 7.9% of the population.

There were 371 households, of which 42.6% had children under the age of 18 living with them, 53.6% were married couples living together, 12.7% had a female householder with no husband present, 7.0% had a male householder with no wife present and 26.7% were non-families. 22.6% of all households were made up of individuals and 11.3% had someone living alone who was 65 years of age or older. The average household size was 2.83 and the average family size was 3.27.

The median age was 32 years. 30% of residents were under the age of 18, 10.8% were between the ages of 18 and 24, 26.7% were from 25 to 44, 20.5% were from 45 to 64 and 11.9% were 65 years of age or older. The sex make-up of the town was 51.2% male and 48.8% female.

=== 2000 census ===
At the 2000 census, there were 805 people, 319 households and 210 families living in the town. The population density was 793.8 per square mile (306.5/km^{2}). There were 345 housing units at an average density of 340.2 per square mile (131.4/km^{2}). The racial make-up of the town was 93.79% White, 0.37% Native American, 5.59% from other races and 0.25% from two or more races. Hispanic or Latino of any race were 5.96% of the population.

There were 319 households, of which 35.4% had children under the age of 18 living with them, 47.3% were married couples living together, 11.9% had a female householder with no husband present and 33.9% were non-families. 28.5% of all households were made up of individuals and 15.0% had someone living alone who was 65 years of age or older. The average household size was 2.52 and the average family size was 3.05.

29.1% of the population were under the age of 18, 10.6% from 18 to 24, 30.8% from 25 to 44, 15.5% from 45 to 64 and 14.0% were 65 years of age or older. The median age was 31 years. For every 100 females, there were 93.5 males. For every 100 females age 18 and over, there were 94.2 males.

The median household income was $33,819 and the median family income was $44,167. Males had a median income of $30,179 and females $24,107. The per capita income was $14,828. About 6.6% of families and 9.6% of the population were below the poverty line, including 9.3% of those under age 18 and 16.7% of those age 65 or over.

== Education ==
It is in the Sunman-Dearborn Community School Corporation.
