= Greendale, Indiana =

- City
- Logo

- Location of Greendale in Dearborn County, Indiana.
- Coordinates: 39°08′20″N 84°51′40″W
- Country: United States
- State: Indiana
- County: Dearborn
- Township: Lawrenceburg

Government
  - Mayor: Vince Karsteter

Area
  - Total: 5.73 sq mi (14.84 km^{2})
  - Land: 5.66 sq mi (14.67 km^{2})
  - Water: 0.069 sq mi (0.18 km^{2})
- Elevation: 650 ft (200 m)

Population (2020)
  - Total: 4,602
  - Density: 812.7/sq mi (313.78/km^{2})
- Time zone: UTC-5 (EST)
  - Summer (DST): UTC-4 (EDT)
- ZIP code: 47025
- Area code: 812
- FIPS code: 18-29448
- GNIS feature ID: 2394982
- Website: Greendale, Indiana

Greendale is a city in Lawrenceburg Township, Dearborn County, Indiana, United States. The population was 4,602 at the 2020 census.

== History ==
Greendale was laid out in 1852, but the plat was not recorded until 1883. Greendale likely took its name from Greendale Cemetery.

== Geography ==
According to the 2010 census, Greendale has a total area of 5.785 square miles (14.98 km^{2}), of which 5.71 square miles (14.79 km^{2}) (or 98.7%) is land and 0.075 square miles (0.19 km^{2}) (or 1.3%) is water.

== Demographics ==
Historical population
Census	Pop.	Note	%±
1880	286		—
1890	435		52.1%
1900	473		8.7%
1910	697		47.4%
1920	763		9.5%
1930	1,050		37.6%
1940	1,548		47.4%
1950	2,018		30.4%
1960	2,861		41.8%
1970	3,783		32.2%
1980	3,795		0.3%
1990	3,881		2.3%
2000	4,296		10.7%
2010	4,520		5.2%
2020	4,602		1.8%
U.S. Decennial Census

=== 2020 census ===
As of the 2020 census, Greendale had a population of 4,602. The median age was 40.5 years. 23.2% of residents were under the age of 18 and 17.8% of residents were 65 years of age or older. For every 100 females there were 93.6 males, and for every 100 females age 18 and over there were 88.8 males age 18 and over.

100.0% of residents lived in urban areas, while 0.0% lived in rural areas.

There were 1,885 households in Greendale, of which 32.8% had children under the age of 18 living in them. Of all households, 47.1% were married-couple households, 16.1% were households with a male householder and no spouse or partner present, and 29.1% were households with a female householder and no spouse or partner present. About 29.1% of all households were made up of individuals and 14.1% had someone living alone who was 65 years of age or older.

There were 1,976 housing units, of which 4.6% were vacant. The homeowner vacancy rate was 0.8% and the rental vacancy rate was 4.5%.

Racial composition as of the 2020 census
Race	Number	Percent
White	4,275	92.9%
Black or African American	41	0.9%
American Indian and Alaska Native	8	0.2%
Asian	25	0.5%
Native Hawaiian and Other Pacific Islander	1	0.0%
Some other race	50	1.1%
Two or more races	202	4.4%
Hispanic or Latino (of any race)	103	2.2%

=== Demographic estimates ===
Census Bureau profile data reports 1,711 families in the city.

=== Income and poverty ===
The median household income is $70,668.

=== 2010 census ===
As of the census of 2010, there were 4,520 people, 1,809 households, and 1,241 families living in the city. The population density was 791.6 inhabitants per square mile (305.6/km^{2}). There were 1,942 housing units at an average density of 340.1 per square mile (131.3/km^{2}). The racial makeup of the city was 95.6% White, 1.0% African American, 0.2% Native American, 0.8% Asian, 0.6% from other races, and 1.8% from two or more races. Hispanic or Latino of any race were 1.6% of the population.

There were 1,809 households, of which 33.1% had children under the age of 18 living with them, 49.9% were married couples living together, 12.8% had a female householder with no husband present, 5.9% had a male householder with no wife present, and 31.4% were non-families. 27.1% of all households were made up of individuals, and 12.6% had someone living alone who was 65 years of age or older. The average household size was 2.50 and the average family size was 3.02.

The median age in the city was 40.1 years. 24.4% of residents were under the age of 18; 6.9% were between the ages of 18 and 24; 25% were from 25 to 44; 28.4% were from 45 to 64; and 15.3% were 65 years of age or older. The gender makeup of the city was 47.8% male and 52.2% female.

=== 2000 census ===
As of the census of 2000, there were 4,296 people, 1,781 households, and 1,212 families living in the city. The population density was 710.5 inhabitants per square mile (274.3/km^{2}). There were 1,852 housing units at an average density of 306.3 per square mile (118.3/km^{2}). The racial makeup of the city was 97.91% White, 0.58% African American, 0.07% Native American, 0.49% Asian, 0.02% from other races, and 0.93% from two or more races. Hispanic or Latino of any race were 0.33% of the population.

There were 1,781 households, out of which 29.4% had children under the age of 18 living with them, 53.2% were married couples living together, 10.9% had a female householder with no husband present, and 31.9% were non-families. 27.8% of all households were made up of individuals, and 14.2% had someone living alone who was 65 years of age or older. The average household size was 2.41 and the average family size was 2.95.

In the city, the population was spread out, with 23.2% under the age of 18, 7.4% from 18 to 24, 28.3% from 25 to 44, 25.0% from 45 to 64, and 16.1% who were 65 years of age or older. The median age was 40 years. For every 100 females, there were 89.4 males. For every 100 females age 18 and over, there were 86.7 males.

The median income for a household in the city was $45,926, and the median income for a family was $55,713. Males had a median income of $40,192 versus $23,176 for females. The per capita income for the city was $23,452. About 3.0% of families and 5.1% of the population were below the poverty line, including 6.6% of those under age 18 and 8.9% of those age 65 or over.
