= West Airport =

West Airport or Airport West may refer to:

- Ireland West Airport
- Key West Airport
- Harriman-and-West Airport
- Branson West Airport
- Cincinnati West Airport
- West Kootenay Regional Airport
- West End Airport
- Virden West Airport
- West Auckland Airport
- West Woodward Airport
- West Memphis Municipal Airport
- West Sale Airport

== See also ==
- Airport West, Victoria
- List of airports in West Virginia
