= List of shipwrecks in January 1879 =

The list of shipwrecks in January 1879 includes ships sunk, foundered, grounded, or otherwise lost during January 1879.

== 1 January ==
List of shipwrecks: 1 January 1879
Ship	State	Description
Dunmore	United Kingdom	The steamship was driven from her moorings in the Clyde by ice and ran aground at Whiteinch, Renfrewshire. She was refloated.
Jeltina	Netherlands	The schooner foundered in the Dogger Bank. Her crew were rescued by the smack Minotaur (United Kingdom). Jeltina was on a voyage from Hamburg to Yeddo, Japan.
James H. Myrick	United Kingdom	The barque was abandoned in the Atlantic Ocean (48°24′N 24°14′W). Her crew were rescued by the steamship City of London (United Kingdom). J. H. Merryck was on a voyage from Prince Edward Island, Canada to Queenstown, County Cork.
Mariotus	United Kingdom	The steamship was driven from her mooring by ice in the Clyde and was scuttled.
Tender	United Kingdom	The lighter was run into by the steamship Tay (United Kingdom) and sank at Grangemouth, Stirlingshire.

== 2 January ==
List of shipwrecks: 2 January 1879
Ship	State	Description
Anastasi	Greece	The ship was wrecked at Sinopoli, Italy.
Cowan	United Kingdom	The brig ran aground on the Kentish Knock. She was on a voyage from Rouen, Seine-Inférieure, France to South Shields, County Durham. She was refloated and resumed her voyage in a leaky condition, but was consequently beached at Southwold, Suffolk.
Dagmar	Denmark	The ship ran aground. She was on a voyage from Newcastle upon Tyne, Northumberland, United Kingdom to Nyborg. She was refloated and taken in to Marstrand, Sweden in a leaky condition.
Eleanor Grace	United Kingdom	The ship departed from Falmouth, Cornwall for Stockton-on-Tees, County Durham. No further trace, reported missing.
Ellen Wignall	United Kingdom	The schooner departed from Charleston, South Carolina, United States for Dublin. No further trace, presumed foundered with the loss of all ten crew.
Laurestine	United Kingdom	The steamship was wrecked on the Kopparstenarna, in the Baltic Sea. Her 23 crew survived. She was on a voyage from Reval, Russia to Rotterdam, South Holland, Netherlands.
Menfi	Greece	The brig was wrecked at "Bezika". Her crew were rescued.
Monica	United Kingdom	The steamship collided with the steamship Leverson in the River Thames and was beached.
Nina	United Kingdom	The brigantine collided with the steamship Santander (United Kingdom) and was abandoned in the English Channel off the Royal Sovereign Lightship ( Trinity House). Her crew were rescued by Santander. Nina was on a voyage from Portsmouth, Hampshire to a Scottish port. She came ashore at Langley, Sussex.
Pater	Netherlands	The galiot struck a wreck in the North Sea and was abandoned. Her four crew reached Aberdeen, United Kingdom in a boat. She was on a voyage from Riga, Russia to Burghead, Moray, United Kingdom.
HMS Thunderer	Royal Navy	The Devastation-class ironclad suffered an explosion in one of her guns that killed eleven of her crew and injured 35 others.
Unnamed	Spain	The schooner was driven ashore and wrecked west of the Pointe de La Coubre, Gironde, France with the loss of all hands.

== 3 January ==
List of shipwrecks: 3 January 1879
Ship	State	Description
Albatross	United Kingdom	The steamship departed from Grimsby, Lincolnshire for Alexandria, Egypt. No further trace, presumed foundered with the loss of all 22 crew.
Bosnia	Germany	The steamship struck a rock and sank off Tarifa, Spain. She was on a voyage from Tarragona, Spain to Hamburg.
Marie	United Kingdom	The ship was driven ashore and wrecked in Bloue Head Bay, Newfoundland Colony. She was on a voyage from New York, United States to Saint John's, Newfoundland Colony.
Marinus	United Kingdom	The brig ran aground on the Longsand, in the North Sea off the coast of Essex. She was on a voyage from Sunderland, County Durham to Madeira. She was abandoned on 5 January as a total loss. Her crew were rescued by the smack Aqueline (United Kingdom).
Nederland	Netherlands	The steamship ran aground on the Cherry Island Flats. She was on a voyage from Philadelphia, Pennsylvania, United States to Antwerp, Belgium. She was refloated on 6 January and resumed her voyage.
Pansy	United Kingdom	The brig was abandoned in the Atlantic Ocean. Her eight crew were rescued by the steamship Royal Minstrel (United Kingdom). Pansy was on a voyage from New Orleans, Louisiana, United States to Liverpool, Lancashire.
Utility	United Kingdom	The schooner was driven ashore and wrecked near Prawle Point, Devon. Her crew were rescued by rocket apparatus.

== 4 January ==
List of shipwrecks: 4 January 1879
Ship	State	Description
Caldbec	United Kingdom	The barque ran aground in the Hooghly River. She was on a voyage from Chittagong to Cochin, India. She was refloated.
Fäderneslandet	Norway	The full-rigged ship was abandoned in the Atlantic Ocean. Her crew were rescued by the full-rigged ship Caledonia (Norway). She was on a voyage from Pensacola, Florida, United States to Greenock, Renfrewshire, United Kingdom.
Isabella	United Kingdom	The ship departed from Briton Ferry, Glamorgan for the Rio Grande do Sul. No further trace, reported missing.
Marie	Germany	The schooner collided with the barque Tommasco (Italy) in the English Channel off Beachy Head, Sussex, United Kingdom and was abandoned. Her five crew were rescued by Tommasco. Marie was on a voyage from Stettin to Portsmouth, Hampshire, United Kingdom. She was towed in to Newhaven, Sussex by the Newhaven Lifeboat Michael Henry ( Royal National Lifeboat Institution) and the steamship Bordeaux (France) but broke up on arrival.
Olga	United Kingdom	The steamship collided with the steamship Constantin (France) at Porto, Portugal and was beached 2 nautical miles (3.7 km) north of Porto. She was on a voyage from London to Porto. She broke in two the next day. Her crew were rescued.
Vindicator	United States	The steamship ran aground 300 yards (270 m) off shore on Long Island at Long Island Beach, one mile (1.6 km) west of Smith's Point. Her fifteen crew were rescued by the United States Life Saving Service. She was on a voyage from Fall River, Massachusetts to Philadelphia, Pennsylvania.
Unnamed	(United Kingdom of Great Britain and Ireland) Aden Colony	The dhow was wrecked on Mushejjerah, in the Hanish Islands, Yemen Vilayet. with the loss of seventeen of the 31 people on board. Thirteen of the survivors were rescued by the steamship Wilton (United Kingdom). The dhow was on a voyage from Aden to Hodeidah, Yemen Vilayet.

== 5 January ==
List of shipwrecks: 5 January 1879
Ship	State	Description
Albert Edward	United Kingdom	The steamship ran ashore between Portsmouth and Southsea, Hampshire. She was refloated the next day.
A. Seaman	(Canada)	The steamship foundered in the Atlantic Ocean. Her crew were rescued by the steamship Harold (Denmark).
Illinois	United States	The steamship ran aground on the Dunbaker Shoals. She was on a voyage from Philadelphia, Pennsylvania to Liverpool, Lancashire, United Kingdom. She was refloated the next day and resumed her voyage.
Margaretta	Germany	The brig was driven ashore and wrecked on Antigua. Her crew were rescued.
Profit and Loss	United Kingdom	The ship was driven ashore and wrecked at Cairnbulg, Aberdeenshire. Her crew were rescued. She was on a voyage from Bangor, Caernarfonshire to Aberdeen.

== 6 January ==
List of shipwrecks: 6 January 1879
Ship	State	Description
Adolph Tidemann	Germany	The ship was driven ashore east of Dunkirk, Nord, France.
Ancona	United States	The schooner was wrecked on the Fort Rocks, off Marblehead, Massachusetts. She was on a voyage from Annapolis, Maryland to New York.
Charles Marie	France	The ship was driven ashore near Les Sables-d'Olonne, Vendée. Her crew were rescued.
F. T. Barry	United Kingdom	The steamship ran aground near Villareal, Spain. She was refloated.
Gerhardine	Germany	The brigantine was abandoned by her crew approximately 30 miles (48 km) south of St Agnes, Isles of Scilly. She was towed into St Mary's by Gladiator. The crew were landed at Le Havre on 16 January.
Leopold Marie	France	The ship ran aground in the Gironde. She was on a voyage from New Orleans, Louisiana, United States to Bordeaux, Gironde. She was refloated.
Maria	Flag unknown	The ship was driven ashore at "Hassan". She was on a voyage from Königsberg, Germany to Fécamp, Seine-Inférieure, France.
Maria Wilhelmina	Germany	The ship ran aground in the Kattegat. She was on a voyage from Swansea, Glamorgan, United Kingdom to Hamburg. She was refloated and taken in to Helsingør, Denmark in a leaky condition.

== 7 January ==
List of shipwrecks: 7 January 1879
Ship	State	Description
Collingwood	United Kingdom	The steamship was driven ashore in the Gironde. She was on a voyage from Newcastle upon Tyne, Northumberland to Bordeaux, Gironde, France.
Effort	United Kingdom	The ketch was driven ashore and wrecked at the entrance to Poole Harbour, Dorset. Her crew were rescued by the Swanage Lifeboat Charlotte Mary ( Royal National Lifeboat Institution).
John Straker	United Kingdom	The steamship was driven ashore at Antwerp, Belgium. She was on a voyage from Odesa, Russia to Antwerp. She was refloated with the assistance of a tug.
Kate	United Kingdom	The schooner was driven ashore in Dulas Bay. Her crew were rescued. She was refloated on 27 January and taken in to Amlwch, Anglesey in a severely damaged condition.
Marchioness of Londonderry	United Kingdom	The schooner was run into in the Firth of Forth by a steam launch belonging to HMS Dryad (Royal Navy) and was severely damaged. She was on a voyage from Kennetpans, Clackmannanshire to Trouville-sur-Mer. Seine-Inférieure, France. She was repaired and resumed her voyage a month later.
Nuelvo Malgenio	Spain	The ship was driven ashore on the coast of West Flanders, Belgium. She was on a voyage from Hamburg, Germany to Puerto Rico. She was refloated and taken in to Dover, Kent, United Kingdom in a leaky condition.
Queen of Devon	United Kingdom	The brig was driven ashore by ice at Tønning, Germany. She was refloated on 9 January.
Queen of the North	United Kingdom	The barque departed from Tuticorin, India for London. No further trace, presumed foundered with the loss of all sixteen crew.
Speedy	United Kingdom	The ship was driven ashore and wrecked at Chesil Beach, Dorset.
Wittow	Germany	The schooner was wrecked on the Mull of Oa, Islay, United Kingdom with the loss of three of the seven people on board. She was on a voyage from Larne, County Antrim to Liverpool, Lancashire.

== 8 January ==
List of shipwrecks: 8 January 1879
Ship	State	Description
Anna	Norway	The barque ran aground in the Elbe at Schulau, Germany. She was refloated the next day and taken in to Hamburg Germany.
E. H. Duval	United States	The ship ran aground in the Elbe at Schulau. She was on a voyage from Philadelphia, Pennsylvania to Hamburg. She was refloated the next day and taken in to Hamburg.
Enterprise	United Kingdom	The brig was abandoned in the Atlantic Ocean. Her crew were rescued by Isabelita (Spain). Enterprise was on a voyage from St. Mary's to Montevideo.
Marie Louise	Sweden	The schooner was wrecked at Dymchurch, Kent, United Kingdom with the loss of one of her six crew. Survivors were rescued by the Coastguard.
Riverside	United Kingdom	The brigantine was abandoned in the Atlantic Ocean. Her crew were rescued by the schooner Isabella (Spain). Riverside was on a voyage from St. Marys, Georgia, United States to Montevideo, Uruguay.
Sarah Ann	United Kingdom	The barque foundered in Swansea Bay. Her crew were rescued by the Mumbles Lifeboat Wolverhampton ( Royal National Lifeboat Institution). Sarah Ann was on a voyage from Swansea, Glamorgan to Montevideo. She was refloated on 11 January and taken in to Swansea.
Unnamed	United Kingdom	The brig was driven ashore in Cloughy Bay.
Unnamed	United Kingdom	The smack was wrecked on Puffin Island, Anglesey while bound for Bangor, Caernarfonshire. Her crew were rescued.
Unnamed	United Kingdom	The smack was wrecked on Puffin Island while bound for Bangor. Both crew were reported to have drowned.

== 9 January ==
List of shipwrecks: 9 January 1879
Ship	State	Description
Aretusa	Austria-Hungary	The steamship ran aground on a reef 30 nautical miles (56 km) north of Jeddah, Hejaz Vilayet. She was on a voyage from Busreh, Persia to Jeddah. She was subsequently abandoned by her crew.
Le Mignon	France	The dandy was driven ashore on the Little Bezeath ridge of rocks at Marazion beach, Mount's Bay, Cornwall in a south-east gale. Her five crew were rescued. She was on a voyage from Swansea to Saint-Valery-sur-Somme, Somme.
Messina	Italy	The ship was driven ashore in Beşik Bay.
Urbino	United Kingdom	The steamship struck rocks at Cádiz, Spain and sank. Her crew survived. She was on a voyage from Hamburg, Germany to Cádiz.
Warkworth	United Kingdom	The steamship ran aground at Harlingen, Friesland, Netherlands. She was on a voyage from Newcastle upon Tyne, Northumberland to Harlingen.
William and Mary	United Kingdom	The Workington brig was driven on to rocks at Cloughey Bay, County Down. The fate of the crew is unknown.

== 10 January ==
List of shipwrecks: 10 January 1879
Ship	State	Description
Albatross	United Kingdom	The steamship departed from Grimsby, Lincolnshire for Alexandria, Egypt. No further trace, reported missing.
C. W. Cochran	United States	The barque was destroyed by fire and sank at Galveston, Texas.
Day Star	United Kingdom	The barque dragged anchor and grounded lightly on mud on 9 January when sheltering off Crookhaven, County Cork, and was re-anchored. The following day she again broke anchorage, in a hurricane, and was driven onto a rocky shore. She was refloated on 8 February and repaired.
Geneva	United Kingdom	The schooner foundered off "Small Accra". Her crew survived. She was on a voyage from the Cape Coast Castle to Little Popo, Africa.
L. Dev. Chipman	Canada	The barque was abandoned in the Atlantic Ocean with the loss of five of the thirteen people on board. Seven survivors were rescued by the barque Huron (United Kingdom) and the eighth was rescued by the full-rigged ship Wauleneh ( Canada). L. Dev. Chipman was on a voyage from Saint John's, Newfoundland Colony to Queenstown, County Cork, United Kingdom.
Mayflower	United Kingdom	The brigantine was abandoned in the Atlantic Ocean (45°53′N 11°08′W). Her crew were rescued by Queen (United Kingdom). Mayflower was on a voyage from Hartlepool, County Durham to Buenos Aires, Argentina.
Semper Fidelis	United Kingdom	The brig was abandoned in the Atlantic Ocean. Her crew were rescued by the steamship West (United Kingdom). Semper Fidelis was on a voyage from London to Saint Vincent.
Unnamed	United Kingdom	The barque was driven ashore 2 nautical miles (3.7 km) north of the Cordouan Lighthouse, Gironde, France.

== 11 January ==
List of shipwrecks: 11 January 1879
Ship	State	Description
Albatross	United Kingdom	The steamship departed from Grimsby, Lincolnshire for Alexandria, Egypt. No further trace, reported missing.
Day Star	United Kingdom	The barque was driven ashore and wrecked at Crookhaven, County Cork with the loss of two of her crew. She was on a voyage from New Orleans, Louisiana, United States to Liverpool, Lancashire.
Elizabeth	United Kingdom	The schooner was abandoned off Wicklow Head, County Wicklow and sank. Her four crew survived. She was on a voyage from Runcorn, Cheshire to Truro, Cornwall.
Hellespont	United Kingdom	The steamship foundered in the Bay of Biscay during a gale with the loss of two of her crew. Survivors were rescued by the steamship Macedonia (United Kingdom) and landed at Gibraltar. Hellespont was on a voyage from Cardiff and/or Swansea, Glamorgan to Port Said, Egypt.
Linguist	United Kingdom	The ship foundered in the Atlantic Ocean 70 nautical miles (130 km) off Cape Clear Island, County Cork with the loss of fifteen of her 29 crew. Survivors took to a lifeboat. They were rescued the next day by the barque Equateur (France). Linguist was on a voyage from Liverpool to Rangoon, Burma.
Loch Sunart	United Kingdom	The full-rigged ship was wrecked on the Skullmartin Rock, off the coast of County Down. Her passengers were taken off by the Ballywalter Lifeboat, which rescued twenty, and by other vessels. Her 35 crew were taken off by the Ballywalter Lifeboat on 13 January. Loch Sunart was on a voyage from Glasgow, Renfrewshire to Melbourne, Victoria. She broke up on 12 February.
Mount Pleasant	United Kingdom	The ship ran aground at Victoria Harbour, Nova Scotia, Canada. She was on a voyage from Port Glasgow, Renfrewshire to Havana, Cuba. She was refloated and resumed her voyage.
Unnamed	Germany	The lighter collided with another lighter and was beached at Bremerhaven.

== 12 January ==
List of shipwrecks: 12 January 1879
Ship	State	Description
General Caulfield	United Kingdom	In heavy seas, the barque became a total wreck after running onto a sandbank in Courtmacsherry Bay, County Cork. Her eighteen crew were rescued by the Courtmacsherry Lifeboat. She was on a voyage from New York, United States to Queenstown, County Cork.
Gunhilda	Canada	The barque was wrecked 2 nautical miles (3.7 km) north of the Cordouan Lighthouse, Gironde, France with the loss of all but two of her crew. She was on a voyage from Baltimore, Maryland, United States to Bordeaux, Gironde.
Huguenot	United States	The ship ran aground in St Mawes Creek. She was refloated with the assistance of two tugs and taken in to Falmouth, Cornwall, United Kingdom where she collided with the brigantine Cassandra (United Kingdom).
Luigi Olivari	Italy	The barque was wrecked between Nethertown and St Bees, Cumberland, United Kingdom with the loss of fourteen of her 22 crew and her pilot. She was on a voyage from Philadelphia, Pennsylvania, United States to Silloth, Cumberland.
Monitor	Norway	The brig was driven ashore on Green Island. She was refloated on 31 January but was consequently condemned.
Norman	United Kingdom	The steamship was wrecked at Penmarc'h Point, Finistère, France. Her crew were rescued. She was on a voyage from Saint-Nazaire, Ille-et-Vilaine, France to Newport, Monmouthshire.
Thistle	United Kingdom	The yawl was sunk by ice in the River Test at Southampton, Hampshire.
Unnamed	United Kingdom	The steam launch was sunk by ice in the River Test at Southampton.

== 13 January ==
List of shipwrecks: 13 January 1879
Ship	State	Description
Africa	United Kingdom	The barque was wrecked at Tripoli, Ottoman Tripolitania with the loss of eight lives.
Alexander Yates	United Kingdom	The ship ran aground on the Crosshaven Bank, off the coast of County Cork. She was refloated with the assistance of a tug.
Cleopas	United Kingdom	The barque ran aground on the Barnard Sand, in the North Sea off the coast of Suffolk. Her ten crew were rescued by the Kessingland RNLI lifeboat. She was on a voyage from Liverpool, Lancashire to Newcastle upon Tyne, Northumberland. She floated off but consequently sank.
Cyclop	United Kingdom	The steamship ran aground in the Elbe at Brokdorf, Germany.
Dunloe	(United Kingdom of Great Britain and Ireland) Guernsey	The schooner ran aground on The Manacles, Cornwall and was abandoned. Her crew survived. She was on a voyage from Granville, Manche, France to Cardiff, Glamorgan. She subsequently sank.
Equateur	France	The barque ran aground on Sarn Badrig. All 29 people on board took to the lifeboat and landed at Pwllheli, Caernarfonshire, United Kingdom. Equateur was on a voyage from San Francisco, California, United States to Guaymas, Mexico and Liverpool. She subsequently sank.
Faith	(United Kingdom of Great Britain and Ireland) Guernsey	The ship ran aground on the Shoebury Sand, in the Thames Estuary. She was on a voyage from London South Shields, County Durham. She was refloated.
Hannah	Denmark	The schooner ran aground at Findhorn, Aberdeenshire, United Kingdom. She was on a voyage from Pillau, Germany to Londonderry, United Kingdom. Hannah was refloated on 16 January.
Harlequin	United Kingdom	The barque was wrecked at Tripoli. Her crew were rescued.
Isolina	United Kingdom	The barque was abandoned off the Fastnet Rock. Her crew were rescued by Isaac Webb (United States). Isolina was on a voyage from Singapore, Straits Settlements to Liverpool.
Lancashire Witch	United Kingdom	The schooner collided with the steamship Yrurac Bat (Spain) and sank 12 nautical miles (22 km) off Holyhead, Anglesey with the loss of all but her captain. He was rescued by Yrurac Bat. Lancashire Witch was on a voyage from Barrow-in-Furness, Lancashire to Swansea, Glamorgan.
Leopoldine Bauer	Trieste	The barque was driven ashore and wrecked 5 nautical miles (9.3 km) north of Bude, Cornwall. Her crew were rescued by the steamship Ravenshoe (United Kingdom). Leopoldine Bauer was on a voyage from Dublin to Cardiff.
Lon Anitole	United States	The brigantine was abandoned off the Aran Islands, County Galway, United Kingdom. She was on a voyage from New York to Limerick, United Kingdom.
Otway	United Kingdom	The schooner was driven ashore and wrecked at Rhoscolyn, Anglesey with the loss of a crew member. Survivors were rescued by the Coastguard. She was on a voyage from Ipswich, Suffolk to Belfast, County Antrim.
Pocahontas	United Kingdom	The barque was wrecked at Tripoli. Her crew were rescued.
Reindeer	(United Kingdom of Great Britain and Ireland) Guernsey	The dandy was driven ashore and wrecked at "L'Etacy", in St. Ouens Bay, Jersey, Channel Islands with the loss of all seven people on board. She was on a voyage from Guernsey to Saint-Malo, Ille-et-Vilaine, France.
Ringleader, and James Wolsey	United States; United Kingdom	Ringleader collided with R. R. Thomas (United States and James Wolsey at Queenstown, County Cork. Ringleader and James Wolsey were both severely damaged.
Schiehallion	United Kingdom	The barque was driven ashore and wrecked at the Blackgang Chine, Isle of Wight with the loss of one of the 29 people on board. Survivors were rescued by the Coastguard. She was on a voyage from Auckland, New Zealand to London.
Tana	Norway	The full-rigged ship was driven ashore at "Pierre Splates". She was on a voyage from London to Port-de-Bouc, Bouches-du-Rhône, France and/or Bône, Algseia. She was refloated and taken in to Marseille, Bouches-du-Rhône in a leaky condition.
True	United Kingdom	The brigantine was driven ashore at "Portobello", 4 nautical miles (7.4 km) west of Newhaven, Sussex. Her six crew were rescued by the Newhaven Lifeboat Michael Henry ( Royal National Lifeboat Institution). True was on a voyage from Swansea to Newhaven. She broke up the next day.
Union	United Kingdom	The schooner was severely damaged by an onboard explosion at Sunderland, County Durham.
Unnamed	United States	The ship was driven ashore at Freshwater West, Pembrokeshire, United Kingdom.
Unnamed	United States	The ship was driven ashore at Breaksea Point, Glamorgan.

== 14 January ==
List of shipwrecks: 14 January 1879
Ship	State	Description
Alert	Canada	The schooner was abandoned in the Atlantic Ocean. Her seven crew were rescued by Caledonia (United Kingdom). Alert was on a voyage from Barbados to Digby, Nova Scotia.
Allisson	United Kingdom	The brig was driven ashore at Jury's Gap, near Rye, Sussex. She was on a voyage from Trouville-sur-Mer, Seine-Inférieure, France to Newcastle upon Tyne, Northumberland.
Gerhardina	Germany	The derelict barque was towed in to the Isles of Scilly, United Kingdom.
Jane	United Kingdom	The ship ran ashore on Flamborough Head, Yorkshire and was wrecked. Her crew were rescued. She was on a voyage from Middlesbrough, Yorkshire to London.
Maria Julia	United Kingdom	The schooner ran aground on the Burbo Bank, in Liverpool Bay.
Queen	(United Kingdom of Great Britain and Ireland) Jersey	The cutter was wrecked at the Cap de la Hague, Manche, France. Her three crew survived. She was on a voyage from Jersey to Southampton, Hampshire. She was towed in to Brixham, Devon in a capsized and waterlogged condition by the smack I.C.U. (United Kingdom) on 14 February.
Rachel Harrison	United Kingdom	The ship ran ashore south of Clogher Head, County Antrim. She was on a voyage from Warrenpoint to Newry.
Sarpin	United Kingdom	The barque ran aground on the Goodwin Sands, Kent. She was on a voyage from Ipswich, Suffolk to Philadelphia, Pennsylvania, United States.
Sudan	Germany	The ship ran aground on the Owers Sandbank, in the English Channel off the coast of Sussex. She was on a voyage from Manila, Spanish East Indies to London, United Kingdom. She was refloated and taken in to Portsmouth, Hampshire, United Kingdom.
Trocadero	United Kingdom	The steamship ran ashore at Étaples, Pas-de-Calais, France. She was on a voyage from Le Tréport, Seine-Inférieure, France to London. She was refloated and resumed her voyage.
William Dawson	United Kingdom	The steamship ran aground on the Spijker Plaat, in the North Sea off the coast of Zeeland, Netherlands. She was on a voyage from Middlesbrough to Antwerp, Belgium. She was refloated and completed her voyage.
Unnamed	Flag unknown	The brig ran aground on the Princess Shoal, in the Solent, and sank.
Unnamed	Flag unknown	The steamship was driven ashore "on the Kinachagen", off the coast of Denmark.

== 15 January ==
List of shipwrecks: 15 January 1879
Ship	State	Description
Batavia	United Kingdom	The full-rigged ship was driven ashore at New York, United States. She was on a voyage from New York to Shanghai, China. She was refloated and resumed her voyage.
Dart	(Dominion of Newfoundland) Newfoundland Colony	The ship departed from Saint John's for Lisbon, Portugal. No further trace, reported missing.
Ranavola	United Kingdom	The barque ran aground on the Doombar. She was on a voyage from Philadelphia, Pennsylvania, United States to Padstow, Cornwall. She was refloated and taken in to Hawker's Covy.
Serapis	United Kingdom	The steamship was damaged by fire at Liverpool, Lancashire.
Success	Norway	The barque was beached at Kitty Hawk, North Carolina, United States. Her ten crew reached shore in their boat. Success was on a voyage from Wilmington, Delaware, United states to Hamburg, Germany. She broke in two, a total loss.
Wesley and Seymour	Canada	The brigantine was abandoned in the Atlantic Ocean (49°10′N 15°25′W). Her crew were rescued by James R. Boyd (United States). Wesley and Seymour was on a voyage from Charleston, South Carolina, United States to Dublin, United Kingdom.
Zanzibar	United Kingdom	The steamship foundered in the Atlantic Ocean with the loss of all 30 crew. She was on a voyage from New York, United States to Glasgow, Renfrewshire. A message in a bottle washed up near the mouth of the River Shannon in July 1880 giving news of the ship's fate.

== 16 January ==
List of shipwrecks: 16 January 1879
Ship	State	Description
Admiral	United Kingdom	The steamship ran aground in the Elbe upstream of Cuxhaven, Germany. She was on a voyage from Newcastle upon Tyne, Northumberland to Hamburg, Germany. She was refloated with assistance on 19 January and completed her voyage.
Admiral Swanson	United Kingdom	The ship sprang a leak and was abandoned in Hoy Sound. Her crew survived. She was on a voyage from Thurso, Caithness to Belfast, County Antrim.
Annie	United Kingdom	The schooner was wrecked at Salcombe, Devon. Her crew were rescued. She was on a voyage from Bahia, Brazil to Salcombe.
Azora	United Kingdom	The schooner was wrecked at Pelekas, Corfu, Greece. Her crew were rescued.
USS Constitution	United States Navy	The frigate went aground at Bolland Point, Swanage, Dorset, United Kingdom. She was refloated with assistance from the tugs Commodore, Lightning, Lothair, Royal Albert, Telegraph (all United Kingdom) and Malta (United Kingdom) and towed in to Portsmouth, Hampshire, United Kingdom. USS Constitution was repaired and returned to service.
Cuba	Canada	The schooner ran aground 3/4 nautical mile (1.4 km) from the Life Saving Station no. 20, 4th district on the New Jersey coast, she became a total wreck. Her crew of six were rescued by the United States Life Saving Service.
Fanny P.	Austria-Hungary	The brig was driven ashore at Rota, Spain. She was on a voyage from Bayonne, Basses-Pyrénées, France to Cádiz, Spain. She was refloated with the assistance of two tugs.
H. A. Brightman	United Kingdom	The steamship was driven ashore at Staithes, Yorkshire. She was on a voyage from the River Tyne to London and Alexandria, Egypt. She floated off the next day and sank. Her 22 crew survived; seven reached shore in a boat, the rest were rescued by the steamship Glencairn (United Kingdom).
Helena	United Kingdom	The schooner struck a rock in Loch Lexwood, Caithness. She was on a voyage from Londonderry to Dundee, Forfarshire. She floated off but consequently sank. All seven people on board survived.
Italia	Italy	The barque ran aground in a blinding snowstorm at Deal's Beach, New Jersey, United States. She became a total wreck. Her fourteen crew were rescued by the United States Life Saving Service.
Itchen	United Kingdom	The steamship ran aground on the Barber Sands, in the North Sea off the coast of Norfolk. She was on a voyage from Southampton, Hampshire to the River Tyne. She was refloated with assistance and taken in to Great Yarmouth, Norfolk.
Leontine	Norway	The barque was wrecked at Thyborøn, Denmark. She was on a voyage from London to Tønsberg.
Maria	United Kingdom	The barque ran aground on the Haisborough Sands, in the North Sea off the coast of Norfolk. She was on a voyage from New York, United States to Hull, Yorkshire. She was refloated and taken in to Great Yarmouth, Norfolk.
S. A. Sadler	Germany	The steamship ran aground in the Elbe at Schulau. She was on a voyage from New York to Hamburg. She was refloated.
Tern	United Kingdom	The steamship ran aground. She was on a voyage from Liverpool, Lancashire to Rotterdam, South Holland, Netherlands. She was refloated and taken in to Rotterdam.

== 17 January ==
List of shipwrecks: 17 January 1879
Ship	State	Description
Crested Wave	United Kingdom	The ship collided with the barque Ernst Ludwig Holst (Germany) and was severely damaged.
David Malcolm	United Kingdom	The barque ran aground on the Whitby Rock. She was on a voyage from the River Tyne to Motril, Spain. She was refloated and put back to South Shields, County Durham.
Eboa	United Kingdom	The steamship ran aground on the Roger Sand, off the coast of Norfolk. She was on a voyage from Marseille, Bouches-du-Rhône, France to King's Lynn, Norfolk.
Faun	United Kingdom	The steamship was driven ashore at Ardlamont Point, Argyllshire.
John and Mary	United Kingdom	The tug ran aground in the Clyde at Greenock, Renfrewshire and sank.
Leeds	United Kingdom	The steamship ran aground on the Caloot Bank, in the North Sea off the coast of Zeeland, Netherlands. She was on a voyage from Grimsby, Lincolnshire to Antwerp, Belgium. She was refloated and completed her voyage.
Lyra	United Kingdom	The barque was driven ashore at Winterton-on-Sea, Norfolk. She was on a voyage from South Shields, County Durham to the Cape Verde Islands. She was refloated the next day.
Osbourne	United Kingdom	The steamship was driven ashore on Inchgarvie, in the Firth of Forth. She was later refloated with assistance and resumed her voyage.
RMS Sarmatian	United Kingdom	The steamship ran aground off Cape Henry, Virginia, United States. She was on a voyage from Halifax, Nova Scotia, Canada to Liverpool, Lancashire.
Stormcock	United Kingdom	The tug was holed whilst assisting with salvage of cargo from the barque King Arthur United Kingdom) and was beached at Fethard, County Wexford. She was repaired, refloated and taken in to Waterford.

== 18 January ==
List of shipwrecks: 18 January 1879
Ship	State	Description
Ameria, Emblyn, Loraine, and Morse	United Kingdom	The barque Loraine was driven into Ameria, Morse and the brig Emlyn in a hurricane at Fray Bentos, Uruguay. Loraine was severely damaged. She was taken in to Montevideo, Uruguay. The other vessels were placed under repair at Fray Bentos.
Cavalier S. Polimini	Italy	The ship was driven ashore at "Kangian", Netherlands East Indies. Her crew were rescued. She was on a voyage from Newcastle, New South Wales to Java, Netherlands East Indies. She floated off and was subsequently towed in to "Kangian", where she was sold.
Concettina	Italy	The ship ran aground at Patras, Greece. She was refloated and found to be leaky.
Eblana	United Kingdom	The schooner was driven ashore at Hartlepool, County Durham. She was on a voyage from Colchester, Essex to Hartlepool. She was refloated with the assistance of a tug and taken in to Hartlepool.
Emma	United Kingdom	The schooner ran aground south of "Dunmure". She was on a voyage from Ayr to Larne, County Antrim. She was refloated and put back to Ayr in a leaky condition.
Euphemia	United Kingdom	The brig was driven ashore at Moville, County Donegal. She was on a voyage from Maryport, Cumberland to Londonderry. She was refloated and towed in to Londonderry.
Fannie L. Kennedy	United States	The ship was driven ashore at Tacumshane, County Wexford, United Kingdom. Her crew were rescued.
Jessie Gilbert	United Kingdom	The ship departed from New York, United States for Liverpool, Lancashire. No further trace, reported missing.
John	United Kingdom	The brig ran aground on the Barber Sand, in the North Sea off the coast of Suffolk. She was on a voyage from Hartlepool to London. She was refloated and resumed her voyage.
Lady Fane	(United Kingdom of Great Britain and Ireland) Isle of Man	The schooner was driven ashore and wrecked at Langness. Her crew were rescued. She was on a voyage from Liverpool to Douglas.
Maeze	United Kingdom	The brig was driven ashore at Hartlepool. She was on a voyage from London to Hartlepool. She was refloated with assistance from the steamship Thomas and Mary () and taken in to Hartlepool.
Mudhopper No. 3	United Kingdom	The mud hopper was run into by the steamship Neera (United Kingdom) in the River Mersey and was abandoned. She was beached at Egremont, Lancashire.
Schmidborn	United Kingdom	The steamship ran aground in the Nieuwe Waterweg. She was on a voyage from Middlesbrough, Yorkshire to Rotterdam, South Holland, Netherlands. She was refloated with the assistance of tugs.
Susan and Ellen	United Kingdom	The ship was sighted off Prawle Point, Devon whilst on a voyage from London to Caernarfon. No further trace, reported missing.
Wild Wave	(United Kingdom of Great Britain and Ireland) Jersey	The schooner was run into by the barque John and Anna (Russia) in the English Channel 16 nautical miles (30 km) south west of Portland, Dorset and was severely damaged. She was abandoned by all but two of her crew, who were rescued by John and Anna. Wild Wave was on a voyage from Antwerp, Belgium to Nantes, Loire-Inférieure, France. Severely damaged, she was towed in to Weymouth, Dorset by the steamship Commodore (United Kingdom).

== 19 January ==
List of shipwrecks: 19 January 1879
Ship	State	Description
Christian Tate	United Kingdom	The smack was driven ashore and wrecked at Black Head, Cornwall. Her crew were rescued. She was on a voyage from Truro to Charlestown, Cornwall.
Corcyra	United Kingdom	The steamship struck a submerged object in Ramsey Sound and was consequently beached at Broad Haven, Pembrokeshire. She was on a voyage from Glasgow, Renfrewshire to Cardiff, Glamorgan. She was refloated on 25 January and taken in to Cardiff for repairs.
Good Hope	United Kingdom	The steamship was driven ashore at "Heraglitza Point", Ottoman Empire. She was on a voyage from Odesa, Russia to Malta. She was refloated and resumed her voyage.
Jessie	United Kingdom	The ship was driven ashore and wrecked at Cefn Sidan, Carmarthenshire. Her crew were rescued. She was on a voyage from Truro, Cornwall to Llanelly, Glamorgan.
Medina	United Kingdom	The ship ran aground at Dundalk, County Louth. She was on a voyage from Swansea, Glamorgan to Dundalk. She was refloated and taken in to Dundalk.
Philena Winslow	United Kingdom	The ship was wrecked on Gough Island, Tristan da Cunha. All 38 people on board survived. She was on a voyage from Cardiff, Glamorgan to Singapore, Straits Settlements.
Robert	United Kingdom	The smack was driven ashore at Kilkeel, County Down. Her crew survived. She was on a voyage from Bangor, Caernarfonshire to Dundalk.
Seven Brothers	United Kingdom	The smack was driven ashore at Balbriggan, County Dublin. She was on a voyage from Bangor, Caernarfonshire to Drogheda, County Louth. She was refloated and taken in to Balbriggan.
Thomas E. Kenney	United Kingdom	The ship was abandoned in the Atlantic Ocean with the loss of four of the 28 people on board. Survivors were rescued on 24 January by the brigantine Brunette (United Kingdom). Thomas E. Kenney was on a voyage from New York, United States to London.
Tsernogora	Canada	The ship collided with Agnes Muir (United Kingdom) in the English Channel between Newhaven, Sussex and the Isle of Wight, United Kingdom and was severely damaged. Tsernogora was on a voyage from Antwerp, Belgium to New York. She put in to Falmouth, Cornwall.

== 20 January ==
List of shipwrecks: 20 January 1879
Ship	State	Description
Albert	United Kingdom	The schooner ran aground on the Middle Sand, in the River Ouse near Goole, Yorkshire. She was on a voyage from Goole to London.
Anapira	United Kingdom	The ship struck the breakwater and was beached at Great Yarmouth, Norfolk. She was on a voyage from Great Yarmouth to Sunderland, County Durham. She was refloated and put back to Great Yarmouth in a severely leaky condition.
Arbutus	United Kingdom	The steamship was severely damaged at Maryport, Cumberland due to being incorrectly moored.
Doriga	United Kingdom	The barque was abandoned in the Atlantic Ocean (48°51′N 3°16′W). Her crew were rescued by the steamship Zena (United Kingdom). Doriga was on a voyage from Newcastle upon Tyne, Northumberland to Valparaíso, Chile. She foundered the next day
Fanny Bailey	United Kingdom	The schooner ran aground and sank at Dundalk, County Louth. Her crew were rescued by the Blackrock Lifeboat. She was on a voyage from Troon, Ayrshire to Dundalk.
Kingston	United Kingdom	The ship ran aground in the Bute Channel. She was on a voyage from Dublin to Cardiff, Glamorgan. She was refloated and taken in to Cardiff.
Peace	United Kingdom	The schooner ran aground on the Middle Sand. She was on a voyage from Goole to London.
Oberon	United Kingdom	The steamship was driven ashore in White Bay, County Cork. Her 29 crew were rescued by the Queenstown Lifeboat. She was on a voyage from New Orleans, Louisiana, United States to Liverpool, Lancashire. She was refloated on 5 February and taken in to Passage West to be drydocked for examination.
Privateer	United Kingdom	The tug sank in the Shannon Estuary off Foynes, County Limerick. Her crew were rescued.
Richard Moxon	United Kingdom	The steamship ran aground on the Middle Sand. She was on a voyage from Ghent, East Flanders, Belgium to Goole.
River Nith	United Kingdom	The ship was damaged by fire at San Francisco, California, United States.
Robert	United Kingdom	The smack was driven ashore at Kilkeel, County Down. She was on a voyage from Bangor, Caernarfonshire to Dundalk.
Unnamed	United Kingdom	The pilot boat was run down and sunk off the coast of Glamorgan by the steamship Zenaide (France) with the loss of one life.

== 21 January ==
List of shipwrecks: 21 January 1879
Ship	State	Description
Bessie Grenfell	United Kingdom	The St Ives schooner went ashore at Saffi in a heavy gale and broke up on rocks. Three of the crew were drowned.
Bon Accord	United Kingdom	The steamship was driven ashore at Blyth, Northumberland. She was on a voyage from Aberdeen to the River Tyne. She was refloated with the assistance of a steamship and was towed in to the River Tyne.
Clara	Straits Settlements	The schooner struck a submerged object at the entrance to the Rhio Strait and sank. Her crew were rescued.
H. Shun	United Kingdom	The schooner foundered in the Atlantic Ocean (48°00′N 14°20′W). Her crew were rescued by Cadet (United Kingdom). H. Shun was on a voyage from New York, United States to Cork.
Isabella	United Kingdom	The pilot boat ran aground in the Bristol Channel.
Janet Wignall	United Kingdom	The schooner was driven ashore at Kirkcudbright with the loss of all five crew. She was on a voyage from Liverpool, Lancashire to Creetown, Kirkcudbrightshire.
Mercur	Norway	The barque was driven ashore and wrecked at Slade, Glamorgan, United Kingdom. Her crew were rescued. She was on a voyage from Boston, Massachusetts, United States to Penarth, Glamorgan.
Santa Maria de Belem	Portugal	The brigantine was wrecked at the Cabo da Roca. All on board were rescued. She was on a voyage from Pernambuco, Brazil to Lisbon.
Star Queen	China	The ship was wrecked at "Gotos" with the loss of one of her thirteen crew. She was on a voyage from Nagasaki, Japan to Shanghai.
Unnamed	United Kingdom	Left Aberdeen harbour on Tuesday morning (possibly 14 January) and attempted to return to port in the afternoon. Later found upturned and no sign of the four crew.

== 22 January ==
List of shipwrecks: 22 January 1879
Ship	State	Description
Allida	United Kingdom	The brig was driven ashore at Whitehaven, Cumberland. She was on a voyage from Troon, Ayrshire to Belfast, County Antrim.
Ben Avon	United Kingdom	The steamship ran aground at Blyth, Northumberland. She was refloated with the assistance of a tugboat and taken in to North Shields, Northumberland.
Bertha	United Kingdom	The barque collided with J. B. Brown (United States) and was abandoned off the Isles of Scilly. Her crew were rescued by J. B. Brown. Bertha was on a voyage from Pabellón de Pica, Chile to Antwerp, Belgium. She consequently foundered.
Britannia	(United Kingdom of Great Britain and Ireland) Jersey	The schooner struck rocks at La Corbière, Jersey and sank. Her crew survived. She was on a voyage from London to Jersey.
Ellida	United Kingdom	The brig was driven ashore at Whitehaven, Cumberland. She was on a voyage from Troon, Ayrshire to Belfast, County Antrim.
Excelsior	United Kingdom	The fishing smack was driven ashore and wrecked at Withernsea, Yorkshire. Her five crew were rescued by the Withernsea Lifeboat Admiral Rous ( Royal National Lifeboat Institution).
Helen	United Kingdom	The barque was driven ashore and wrecked at Rosslanre, County Wexford. Her twelve crew were rescued by the Coastguard. She was on a voyage from Liverpool, Lancashire to the Brass River. She was refloated on 6 February.
Ituna	United Kingdom	The steamship collided with John O. Scott (United Kingdom) and sank in the River Thames at Tilbury, Essex.
Matilda C. Smith	Canada	The ship was driven ashore at the Pointe de la Coubre, Gironde, France. She was on a voyage from Baltimore, Maryland, United States to Bordeaux, Gironde.
Santander	United Kingdom	The steamship ran aground at Dunkirk, Nord. She was on a voyage from Bilbao, Spain to Dunkirk.
Unique	United Kingdom	The smack was driven onto the Pole Sands, off Exmouth, Devon. Her crew were rescued.

== 23 January ==
List of shipwrecks: 23 January 1879
Ship	State	Description
Abd-el-Kader	France	The barque ran aground off Goeree, Zeeland, Netherlands. Her crew were rescued. She was on a voyage from Batavia, Netherlands East Indies to Rotterdam, South Holland, Netherlands. She broke in two on 28 January and was a total loss.
Abicore	United Kingdom	The steamship ran aground in the Nieuwe Waterweg. She was on a voyage from Grangemouth, Stirlingshire to Rotterdam, South Holland, Netherlands. She was refloated with assistance from the tug Engine (Netherlands).
Anne Margetta	Norway	The brigantine was driven ashore and wrecked at Bollard Point, Dorset, United Kingdom. All twelve people on board were rescued, some by rocket apparatus. She was on a voyage from Rouen, Seine-Inférieure, France to Baltimore, Maryland, United States.
Assistant	Flag unknown	Capsized while attempting to enter the harbour at Antwerp, Belgium. All eight on board drowned.
Emerald	United Kingdom	The steamship ran aground at Dundee, Forfarshire. She was on a voyage from Sunderland, County Durham to Dundee.
Hagar	United Kingdom	The schooner was abandoned off Portsall, Finistère, France. Her crew took to a boat; they were rescued the next day by a French lugger. She was on a voyage from London to Landerneau, Finistère.
Jessamine	United Kingdom	The schooner capsized at Smerwick, County Kerry.
Lothian	United Kingdom	The schooner was driven ashore at Burghead, Moray. She was on a voyage from Sunderland to Burghead.
Sirius	United Kingdom	The brig struck a submerged object and sank at Havre de Grâce, Seine-Inférieure, France. She was on a voyage from South Shields, County Durham to Havre de Grâce. Subsequently refloated and repaired.
Tubal Cain	United Kingdom	The steamship ran aground on the Longsand, in the North Sea off the coast of Essex. She was on a voyage from Rotterdam to London. She was refloated and towed in to Gravesend, Kent in a waterlogged condition.

== 24 January ==
List of shipwrecks: 24 January 1879
Ship	State	Description
HMS Active	Royal Navy	The Volage-class corvette grounded on an unmapped shoal north of the Tugela River, Cape Colony. She was refloated almost immediately.
Annie Margaretta	Norway	The brigantine was driven ashore at Bolland Point, Dorset, United Kingdom. Her twelve crew survived; six reached shore in a boat and six were rescued by the Coastguard. She was on a voyage from Rouen, Seine-Inférieure, France to Baltimore, Maryland, United States.
Expert	United Kingdom	The fishing boat was run down and sunk by the steamship Countess of Durham (United Kingdom) and sank off the coast of Kincardineshire with the loss of three of her four crew. The survivor was rescued by Countess of Durham.
Flora	Norway	The brig collided with the barque Marie Thérèse (France) and was abandoned. Her crew were rescued by Marie Thérèse. Flora was on a voyage from Torrevieja, Spain to Marseille, Bouches-du-Rhône, France. She was discovered by the brig Ramond (France) which put two of her crew aboard. Flora was towed in to Gibraltar the next day by the tug Lion Belge ( (United Kingdom of Great Britain and Ireland) Gibraltar).
Friesland	Netherlands	The barque was abandoned in the Zuyder Zee. Her crew were rescued by a tug. She was on a voyage from Riga, Russia to Harlingen, Friesland. She subsequently ran aground and became beset by ice.
Hebe	Norway	The barque was wrecked off the Swin Middle Lightship ( Trinity House). Her fourteen crew were rescued by the Clacton Lifeboat Albert Edward ( Royal National Lifeboat Institution). She was towed in to Sheerness, Kent, United Kingdom in a derelict condition.
Hero	United Kingdom	The schooner foundered off St. Agnes, Cornwall. Her crew survived. She was on a voyage from Porthcawl, Glamorgan to Penryn, Cornwall.
Marcus Coipel	Canada	The ship was wrecked on the Stone Breakers. She was on a voyage from Charleston, South Carolina to Beaufort, South Carolina, United States.
Quicksilver	United Kingdom	The schooner collided with Ryde Pier, Isle of Wight and was scuttled.
Scud	United States	The barque ran aground one mile (1.6 km) south of Life Saving Station No. 12, 2nd District, she became a total wreck. Her crew of five were rescued by the United States Life Saving Service.
HMS Tenedos	Royal Navy	The corvette grounded on an unmapped shoal north of the Tugela River, South Africa and on the next high tide was hauled off by HMS Active.
Unnamed	United Kingdom	The fishing boat was run down and sunk off Stonehaven, Aberdeenshire by the steamship Countess of Durham (United Kingdom) with the loss of three of her four crew.

== 25 January ==
List of shipwrecks: 25 January 1879
Ship	State	Description
Elpis	Greece	The brig ran aground in the Dardanelles. Her crew were rescued.
Emma and Mary	United Kingdom	The ship ran aground at Hartlepool, County Durham. She was on a voyage from Hartlepool to Lowestoft, Suffolk. She was refloated with assistance from the tug William and Charles (United Kingdom).
Louisa	United Kingdom	The steamship ran aground at Llanelly, Glamorgan. She was on a voyage from Cagliari, Sardinia, Italy to Llanelly.
Lunan	United Kingdom	The ship was wrecked at "Chiv Sen", Burma. Her crew were rescued.
Nio	Spain	The ship caught fire at Charleston, South Carolina, United States and was scuttled. She was on a voyage from Charleston to Barcelona.
Scottish Bard	United Kingdom	The ship was driven ashore at Rockhampton, Queensland. She was refloated and taken in to Rockhampton in a leaky condition.
Unnamed	Flag unknown	The ship was driven ashore on the Isle of Arran, United Kingdom.

== 26 January ==
List of shipwrecks: 26 January 1879
Ship	State	Description
Avola Pellegrina	Italy	The barque was abandoned in the Atlantic Ocean. She was on a voyage from Cardiff, Glamorgan, United Kingdom to Genoa. She was subsequently discovered by W. G. Putman (Flag unknown), which put some of her crew aboard. They took Avola Pellegrina in to Lisbon, Portugal.
Noemi	France	The brig sprang a leak and foundered in the Atlantic Ocean 60 nautical miles (110 km) north west of Vigo, Spain. Her crew were rescued by Corisande (United Kingdom). Noemi was on a voyage from Cardiff to Algiers, Algeria.
Northbourne	United Kingdom	The steamship ran aground in the Great Bitter Lake. She was on a voyage from Newcastle upon Tyne, Northumberland to Bombay, India. She was refloated on 1 February.
Raymond	United Kingdom	The barque departed from Liverpool, Lancashire for the Delaware Breakwater. No further trace, presumed foundered with the loss of all seventeen crew.
Snow Bird	United States	The schooner ran aground in a gale 2 1/2 miles (4.0 km) north east of Life saving Station No. 13, 2nd District, near Chatham, Massachusetts. She was lost and her crew of five were rescued by two boats from Chatham.

== 27 January ==
List of shipwrecks: 27 January 1879
Ship	State	Description
City of Kandy	United Kingdom	The ship was sighted in the Atlantic Ocean whilst on a voyage from Mauritius to Liverpool, Lancashire. No further trace, reported missing.
Diadem	United Kingdom	The barque was abandoned in the Atlantic Ocean after a collision with the stores ship USS Supply (United States Navy). Her crew were rescued by USS Supply and were landed at Madeira. Diadem was on a voyage from Cape Town, Cape Colony to Swansea, Glamorgan.
Edith Owen	United Kingdom	The steamship ran aground on the Coal Rock, off the coast of Anglesey and was wrecked.
Enniskillen	United Kingdom	The steamship ran aground in the Firth of Forth off the mouth of the River Carron. She was on a voyage from Grangemouth, Stirlingshire to Boulogne, Pas-de-Calais, France. She was refloated the next day and resumed her voyage.
Glaucus	United States	The steamship ran aground on the Banjaard Sand, in the North Sea. She was on a voyage from the Elbe to Dordrecht, South Holland, Netherlands. She was refloated with the assistance of a tug and taken in to Bremerhaven, Germany.
Lorne	United Kingdom	The steamship ran aground at Rotterdam, South Holland. She was on a voyage from Rotterdam to Hull, Yorkshire. She was refloated.
Ousel	United Kingdom	The steamship ran aground at Maassluis, South Holland. She was on a voyage from Liverpool to Rotterdam.
Scycouse	France	The steamship ran aground at the mouth of the Rhône. She was on a voyage from Marseille, Bouches-du-Rhône to Cette, Hérault.

== 28 January ==
List of shipwrecks: 28 January 1879
Ship	State	Description
Edith Owen	United Kingdom	The steamship ran aground on the Middle Mouse Sand, off the coast of Anglesey and was wrecked. Her crew were rescued. She was on a voyage from Bristol, Gloucestershire to Liverpool, Lancashire.
Hermann	United Kingdom	The schooner ran aground on the Barber Sand, in the North Sea of the coast of Norfolk. She was on a voyage from Hull, Yorkshire to London. She was refloated with the assistance of a tug and taken in to Great Yarmouth, Norfolk in a waterlogged condition.
Mactan	Spain	The steamship ran aground off Talunan-an Island, Spanish East Indies. She was on a voyage from Manila to Yloilo. She floated off and sank with the loss of eight lives.
Margaret	United Kingdom	The smack collided with the steamship Ailsa (United Kingdom) and sank in the Clyde at Erskine, Renfrewshire.
Maroon	Canada	The ship capsized in a squall off Barbados. Her crew survived.
Orconers	Germany	The steamship ran aground in the Nieuwe Waterweg. She was on a voyage from Bilbao, Spain to Rotterdam, South Holland, Netherlands.
Veritas	Sweden	The ship was driven ashore and severely damaged at Melbourne, Victoria. She was on a voyage from Gävle to Melbourne. She was refloated and taken in to Melbourne.

== 29 January ==
List of shipwrecks: 29 January 1879
Ship	State	Description
Albinus	United Kingdom	The schooner foundered in the North Sea 6 nautical miles (11 km) east north east of Staithes, Yorkshire. Her crew survived. She was on a voyage from Hartlepool, County Durham to Whitby, Yorkshire.
Glynllifon	United Kingdom	The ship departed from the Coosaw River, South Carolina, United States. She was not seen or heard from again.
Joseph Ferens	United Kingdom	The steamship was driven ashore at Kullagrundet, Sweden. She was on a voyage from Reval, Russia to London.
Margaret	United Kingdom	The schooner collided with the barque Venzolana (France) and sank off the Helwick Lightship ( Trinity House). Her crew were rescued by Venzolana. Margaret was on a voyage from Waterford to Newport, Monmouthshire.
New Zealand	United Kingdom	The brigantine was driven ashore at Blackpool, Pembrokeshire. Her crew were rescued.
Salier	Germany	The steamship ran aground at Bremen. She was on a voyage from Bremen to Brazil. She was later refloated and resumed her voyage.

== 30 January ==
List of shipwrecks: 30 January 1879
Ship	State	Description
Carbonic	United Kingdom	The steamship was driven ashore on the Isle of Arran.
Ephrussi	Norway	The ship was driven ashore 9 nautical miles (17 km) east of Almería, Spain. She was on a voyage from Odesa, Russia to Bremerhaven, Germany. She was later refloated and taken in to Almería.
Koning der Nederlanden	Netherlands	The steamship ran aground in the Suez Canal. She was on a voyage from Batavia, Netherlands East Indies to the Nieuwe Diep.
Riveresco	United Kingdom	The schooner was driven ashore at Dulas, Anglesey. She was on a voyage from Garston, Lancashire to Waterford.

== 31 January ==
List of shipwrecks: 31 January 1879
Ship	State	Description
Angé	France	The lugger went ashore in a strong south southeast gale at Porthcurno, Cornwall, United Kingdom. Her four crew were rescued by employees of the Eastern Telegraph Company. She was on a voyage from Bordeaux, Gironde to Swansea, Glamorgan, United Kingdom.
Shamrock	United Kingdom	The smack was run into by the schooner Lady Neave (United Kingdom) and sank in the Belfast Lough. Her four crew survived. Shamrock was on a voyage from Bowling, Dunbartonshire to Skerries, County Dublin.

== Unknown date ==
List of shipwrecks: Unknown date in January 1879
Ship	State	Description
Abeona	United Kingdom	The ship was abandoned before 30 January. Her crew were rescued. She was on a voyage from Saint John's, Newfoundland Colony to Plymouth, Devon.
Ada R.	United Kingdom	The schooner was driven ashore in the Gut of Canso.
Ailsa	United States	The ship was driven ashore. She was on a voyage from Aspinwall, United States of Colombia to New York. She was refloated and completed her voyage, arriving at New York on 31 January.
Alpha	United Kingdom	The steamship collided with the transport ship Bosphorus (Ottoman Navy) and sank at Constantinople, Ottoman Empire. All on board were rescued by Bosphorus and another Ottoman Navy vessel. Alpha was on a voyage from Odesa, Russia to Antwerp, Belgium.
Annavino	France	The ship foundered in the Irish Sea. Wreckage came ashore at Rosslare, County Wexford, United Kingdom.
Argo	United Kingdom	The barque foundered off Cape Finisterre, Spain. Her crew were rescued by the barque Iquique (Italy). Argo was on a voyage from Swansea to Dakar, Senegal.
Argonaut	Germany	The barque was driven ashore at Blankenese. She was on a voyage from Hamburg to Philadelphia, Pennsylvania, United States.
August	Germany	The ship was wrecked near "Lyngad".
Barnard Castle	United Kingdom	The steamship was driven ashore on Skagen, Denmark. She was on a voyage from New Orleans, Louisiana, United States to Reval, Russia. She was refloated on 7 January and taken in to Copenhagen.
Batavia	Flag unknown	The ship ran aground at Adelaide, South Australia. She was refloated.
Bertha	United Kingdom	The barque was abandoned off the Isles of Scilly after a collision with J Brown (United Kingdom), which headed for Queenstown with the crew of the abandoned ship. Bertha foundered shortly after.
Blonde	United Kingdom	The steamship was driven ashore at Hittarp, Sweden. She was on a voyage from Danzig, Germany to London. She had been refloated by 15 January.
Blue Jacket	(Canada)	The ship was destroyed by fire in the Atlantic Ocean.
Bombay	United States	The ship ran aground on the Gunfleet Sand, in the North Sea off the coast of Suffolk, United Kingdom. She was on a voyage from Bremen, Germany to Key West, Florida. She was refloated on 31 January and towed in to Harwich, Essex, United Kingdom. She was towed to London for repairs on 4 February.
Bonanza	United States	The ship was driven ashore at South Ferry, New York She was on a voyage from New York City to Antwerp. She was refloated.
Chile	United Kingdom	The barque was abandoned at sea. Her crew were rescued by the schooner E. J. Morrison (United States). Chile was on a voyage from Baltimore, Maryland, United States to Rochefort, Charente-Inférieure, France.
Condor	United Kingdom	The ship was driven ashore and wrecked at Yantai (Chefoo), China between 22 and 24 January with the loss of two lives.
Cora	United Kingdom	The schooner was driven ashore near Barnegat, New Jersey, United States. She was on a voyage from Arecibo, Puerto Rico to New York.
Courier	United Kingdom	The ship foundered off the coast of Northumberland.
Creole	United Kingdom	The brigantine foundered at sea before 19 January. Her crew were rescued. She was on a voyage from the Rio Grande to the English Channel.
Decima	Germany	The steamship ran aground at Callao, Peru before 13 January.
Dillwyn	United Kingdom	The brig was driven ashore at Skibbereen, County Cork. She was refloated with assistance from the Coastguard.
Don José	Spain	The barque was destroyed by fire. She was on a voyage from Antwerp to Havana, Cuba.
Douse	United Kingdom	The ship was severely damaged by fire during a voyage from Limerick to Troon, Ayrshire, where she arrived on 15 January.
Duchess	United Kingdom	The brig was abandoned at sea. Her crew were rescued. She was on a voyage from Charleston, South Carolina, United States to London.
E. J. Harland	United Kingdom	The ship ran aground in the Belfast Lough. She was on a voyage from Philadelphia to Belfast, County Antrim. She was refloated on 7 January.
Eliza	United Kingdom	The sloop was driven ashore and severely damaged at Shoreham-by-Sea, Sussex. She was on a voyage from Perros, Côtes-du-Nord, France to Shoreham-by-Sea.
Elsmore	United Kingdom	The schooner was wrecked. Her crew were rescued by the Skerries Lifeboat.
Erycina	United Kingdom	The schooner was abandoned in the Atlantic Ocean before 6 January. Her crew were rescued by the full-rigged ship Rosita (Norway). Erycita was on a voyage from Beaufort, South Carolina, United States to Birkenhead, Cheshire.
Etna	Canada	The schooner was abandoned in the Atlantic Ocea before 19 January.
Eunice	United Kingdom	The schooner was abandoned in the Atlantic Ocean before 4 January. Her crew were rescued by Calliope (United Kingdom). Eunice was on a voyage from Saint John's to Ardrossan, Ayrshire.
Evangelistra	Greece	The ship was driven ashore on Tenedos, Ottoman Empire. She was on a voyage from the Danube to Naples, Italy.
Faedrenelandet	Norway	The ship was abandoned in the Atlantic Ocean before 9 January.
Frederick	Germany	The barque was abandoned in the Atlantic Ocean after 16 January while carrying pitch pine from Doboy, Georgia, United States to Falmouth, Cornwall with the loss of her captain. Survivors and ship's dog, a Newfoundland, were rescued by the barque Gaetano (Italy).
Federico lo Svevo	Italy	The ship was driven ashore at Honfleur, Manche, France. She was on a voyage from Baltimore to Honfleur. She was refloated and taken in to Honfleur in a leaky condition.
Fuschia	United Kingdom	The schooner was driven ashore and wrecked on Terschelling, Friesland, Netherlands.
Girda	United Kingdom	The ship ran aground. She was on a voyage from Gloucester to Charleston, South Carolina, United States. She was refloated and completed her voyage in leaky condition.
Gracia	United Kingdom	The steamship ran aground on the Tennessee Reef. She was on a voyage from Liverpool, Lancashire to Havana. She was refloated with assistance.
Hansine	Denmark	The ship sank off the east coast of Jutland with the loss of all hands. She was on a voyage from Horsens to London.
Hartlepool	United Kingdom	The steamship was driven ashore at Dunkirk, Nord, France. She was refloated on 11 January and taken in to Dunkirk.
Herbert H. Raymond	United Kingdom	The ship was abandoned at sea. She was on a voyage from Saint Lucia to Weymouth, Dorset.
Hertha	Flag unknown	The ship was abandoned in the Atlantic Ocean before 21 January. Her crew were rescued by Ganger Rolf (Flag unknown). Hertha was on a voyage from New York to Honfleur.
Jason	United States	The ship was abandoned at sea before 19 January. Her crew were rescued. She was on a voyage from Kronstadt, Russia to New York.
Johanna	United Kingdom	The ship was driven ashore at "Ferrit", County Kerry.
John	United Kingdom	The ship was lost off Camaret-sur-Mer, Finistère, France.
Julia	(United Kingdom of Great Britain and Ireland) Guernsey	The schooner was wrecked on the Isle of Wight with the loss of all nine crew. She was on a voyage from Guernsey to London.
J. W. Beard	United States	The ship was driven ashore and wrecked at Saint-Jean-de-Luz, Basses-Pyrénées, France. Her crew were rescued. She was on a voyage from New York to Bayonne, Basses-Pyrénées.
Lady Lilford	United Kingdom	The brig was wrecked. Her crew were rescued by the Skerries Lifeboat.
Laurel	United Kingdom	The ship was driven ashore near Tunis, Beylik of Tunis. She was refloated and towed in to Tunis by an Italian steamship.
Lady Hulse	United Kingdom	The ship was driven ashore at the mouth of the Rimac River. She was on a voyage from Cardiff, Glamorgan to Callao, Peru. She was refloated on 25 December.
Leeds	United Kingdom	The steamship was driven ashore at Callao.
Lord Clarendon	United Kingdom	The ship was abandoned at sea. She was on a voyage from Bordeaux to the Delaware Breakwater, United States.
Manfred	United Kingdom	The barque was wrecked in the Lacepede Islands, Western Australia. Her crew were rescued.
Marion	Canada	The ship capsized off Barbados. Her crew survived.
Marius Copel	United States	The ship was wrecked at "Stonebreakers". She was on a voyage from Charleston, South Carolina to Beaufort, North Carolina.
Mayard	United Kingdom	Two survivors from the steamship were landed at Ferrol, Spain by a Spanish vessel.
Mecca	United Kingdom	The steamship was wrecked on the Spilia Reef, in the Torres Strait. She was on a voyage from Hong Kong to Sydney, New South Wales.
Moero	United Kingdom	The schooner was abandoned at sea with some loss of life. She was on a voyage from Yarmouth, Nova Scotia, Canada to Saint Kitts.
Nelson	United Kingdom	The barque capsized at Warrenpoint, County Antrim.
Nio	United Kingdom	The steamship caught fire at Charleston. She was on a voyage from Charleston to Barcelona, Spain.
Onward	United Kingdom	The ship was wrecked on "Hakin Island", Baltimore, County Cork. She was on a voyage from Newport, Monmouthshire to Cork.
Orion	United Kingdom	The barque was abandoned in the Atlantic Ocean before 2 January.
Pippo	Italy	The ship was driven ashore and wrecked near Beyrout, Ottoman Syria. Her crew were rescued.
Prinz Heinrich	United Kingdom	The steamship ran aground at Murviedro, Spain. She was refloated with assistance and taken in to Valencia, Spain, where she arrived on 5 January.
Rebecca	Germany	The barque was driven ashore and wrecked at Yantai (Chefoo) between 22 and 24 January. Her crew were rescued.
Reggmes	United Kingdom	The full-rigged ship was abandoned in the Atlantic Ocean before 22 January.
Roquelle	United Kingdom	The steamship ran aground at Schulau, Germany. She was on a voyage from Liverpool to Hamburg. She was refloated and taken in to Hamburg.
Rosa Bottcher	Germany	The barque was driven ashore at Yantai (Chefoo) between 22 and 24 January. Her crew were rescued. She was consequently condemned.
Rosario	United Kingdom	The ship was destroyed by fire at Tongoi, Chile.
Runnymede	United Kingdom	The ship was wrecked on Browse Island, Western Australia. Her crew survived.
Salup	United Kingdom	The ship was driven ashore in the Hooghly River.
Sarpen	Denmark	The ship ran aground on the Goodwin Sands, Kent, United Kingdom. She was on a voyage from Ipswich, Suffolk to Philadelphia. She was refloated on 17 January and taken in to Gravesend, Kent.
Savannah	United Kingdom	The full-rigged ship was driven ashore at "Faraman", Bouches-du-Rhône, France.
Seybouse	France	The steamship ran aground at the mouth of the Rhône. She was on a voyage from Marseille, Bouches-du-Rhône to Cette, Hérault.
Sofia	Italy	The brigantine was driven ashore in the Longhole Gut, Glamorgan after 21 January. All ten people on board survived. She was on a voyage from Naples to Swansea.
Sophie G.	Norway	The barque was wrecked on Inagua, Bahamas. Her crew were rescued. She was on a voyage from Cap-Haïtien, Haiti to Havre de Grâce, Seine-Inférieure, France.
Sudpol	Spain	The ship was driven ashore and wrecked at Bahía Honda, Cuba. She was on a voyage from Antwerp to Havana.
Sulena	United Kingdom	The ship was wrecked on Brown Island, in the Lacepedes Islands. Her crew survived.
Thomas M. Reed	United States	The ship was driven ashore and wrecked near Milford Haven, Pembrokeshire, United Kingdom with the loss of three of her 23 crew. Survivors were rescued by rocket apparatus. She was on a voyage from San Francisco, California to Liverpool.
Thomas Vaughan	United Kingdom	The steamship ran aground between Harrington and Workington, Cumberland. She was on a voyage from Cartagena, Spain to Silloth, Cumberland. She was refloated on 31 January and resumed her voyage.
Vortigern	United Kingdom	The steamship was driven ashore near Cape Guardafui, Majeerteen Sultanate. All on board were rescued. The ship was plundered by the local inhabitants. She was on a voyage from Marseille to Zanzibar. Vortigern was later refloated and towed in to Aden, Aden Colony.
Winged Hunter	United Kingdom	The ship ran aground at Bermuda. She was on a voyage from Bermuda to New York.
