= CSTCC =

CSTCC may refer to:

- Chattanooga State Technical Community College
- Cincinnati State Technical and Community College
