= Gcal (disambiguation) =

Gcal may refer to:

- Google Calendar, a free calendaring Web application
- Gigacalorie, referred to as a ton of TNT for thermochemical reactions

GCAL may refer to:

- Greater Cincinnati Academic League, a high school quiz bowl league
