= Hooven, Ohio =

- Census-designated place
- Location in Hamilton County and the state of Ohio.
- Coordinates: 39°11′06″N 84°45′23″W
- Country: United States
- State: Ohio
- County: Hamilton

Area
  - Total: 2.68 sq mi (6.93 km^{2})
  - Land: 2.58 sq mi (6.67 km^{2})
  - Water: 0.10 sq mi (0.26 km^{2})
- Elevation: 620 ft (190 m)

Population (2020)
  - Total: 464
  - Density: 180.2/sq mi (69.57/km^{2})
- Time zone: UTC-5 (Eastern (EST))
  - Summer (DST): UTC-4 (EDT)
- ZIP code: 45033
- FIPS code: 39-36232
- GNIS feature ID: 2585511

Hooven is a census-designated place (CDP) in southeastern Whitewater Township, Hamilton County, Ohio, United States. The population was 464 at the 2020 census.

== Geography ==
Hooven is located in the valley of the Great Miami River, 18 miles (29 km) northwest of downtown Cincinnati. State Route 128 is the main road through the community, running northeast to Miamitown. U.S. Route 50 forms the southern edge of the CDP, and Interstate 275 forms the northwestern edge, with access to Hooven via Exit 21. The Great Miami River is the eastern edge of the community.

According to the United States Census Bureau, the CDP has a total area of 2.6 square miles (6.8 km^{2}), of which 2.5 square miles (6.6 km^{2}) is land and 0.077 square miles (0.2 km^{2}), or 2.96%, is water.

== Demographics ==
As of the census of 2020, there were 464 people living in the CDP, for a population density of 180.19 people per square mile (69.57/km^{2}). There were 207 housing units. The racial makeup of the CDP was 94.4% White, 0.2% Black or African American, 0.2% Native American, 0.2% Asian, 0.4% Pacific Islander, 1.1% from some other race, and 3.4% from two or more races. 1.3% of the population were Hispanic or Latino of any race.

There were 213 households, out of which 18.3% had children under the age of 18 living with them, 57.7% were married couples living together, 12.2% had a male householder with no spouse present, and 20.2% had a female householder with no spouse present. 23.9% of all households were made up of individuals, and 18.3% were someone living alone who was 65 years of age or older. The average household size was 2.54, and the average family size was 3.10.

19.9% of the CDP's population were under the age of 18, 56.9% were 18 to 64, and 23.2% were 65 years of age or older. The median age was 49.5. For every 100 females, there were 78.3 males.

According to the U.S. Census American Community Survey, for the period 2016-2020 the estimated median annual income for a household in the CDP was $52,708, and the median income for a family was $83,482. About 15.9% of the population were living below the poverty line, including 15.7% of those under age 18 and 0.0% of those age 65 or over. About 57.6% of the population were employed, and 8.1% had a bachelor's degree or higher.

== Gulf Oil Refinery ==
The Gulf Oil Company began operations at a facility in Hooven in 1931, producing a variety of products including jet fuel, diesel fuel, gasoline, and home-heating oil. In 1985, the site was acquired by the Chevron Corporation. That same year the U.S. EPA started investigating the site as a result of fuel flowing into the nearby Great Miami River. In 1986, the refinery was closed, eliminating over 200 jobs and severely impacting the local economy of Hooven. Since then, Chevron has been negotiations with the EPA and undergoing major clean up of the site's contaminated soil and groundwater.

The EPA states that during the refinery's operation, an estimated 5 million gallons of refined gasoline and diesel fuel leaked into the local aquifer. The residents of Hooven are supplied clean drinking water from the Cleves public drinking water supply, which was not contaminated by the refinery.
