= Hugh Campbell House =

Historic house in Ohio, United States

- U.S. National Register of Historic Places
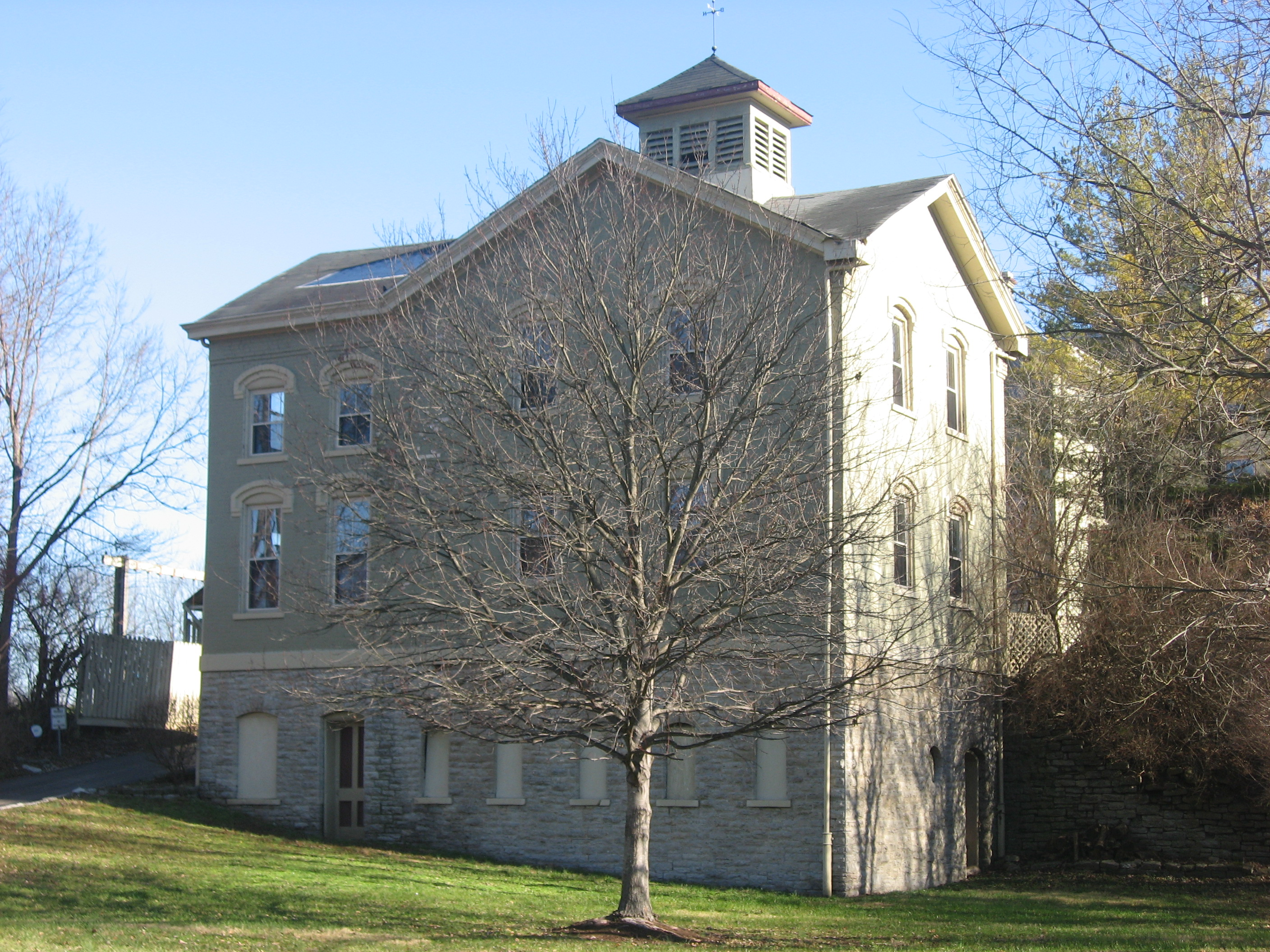
- Barn next to the house

- Location within Ohio Location within the United States
- Location: 332 Weathervane Road, near Harrison, Ohio
- Coordinates: 39°15′7″N 84°48′45″W
- Built: 1858
- Architect: Hugh Campbell
- NRHP reference No.: 76001448
- Added to NRHP: November 7, 1976

Hugh Campbell House is a historic building near Harrison, Ohio. It was listed in the National Register of Historic Places on November 7, 1976.

The Hugh Campbell House was built 1854–1860 and is an excellent example of Italianate Villa architecture. Its builder, Hugh Campbell, was born in 1828 in County Tyrone, Ireland, and immigrated with his father to Philadelphia. He became a cattleman and contractor. In 1858 Hugh Married Martha A. Green. They had no children. Many nieces and nephews and a few servants lived in the home originally. Both are buried in Spring Grove Cemetery in Cincinnati and Hugh donated a significant portion of his estate to local orphanages when he died in 1901. The house was originally red brick, but painted over.
