= Harrison, Ohio =

- City
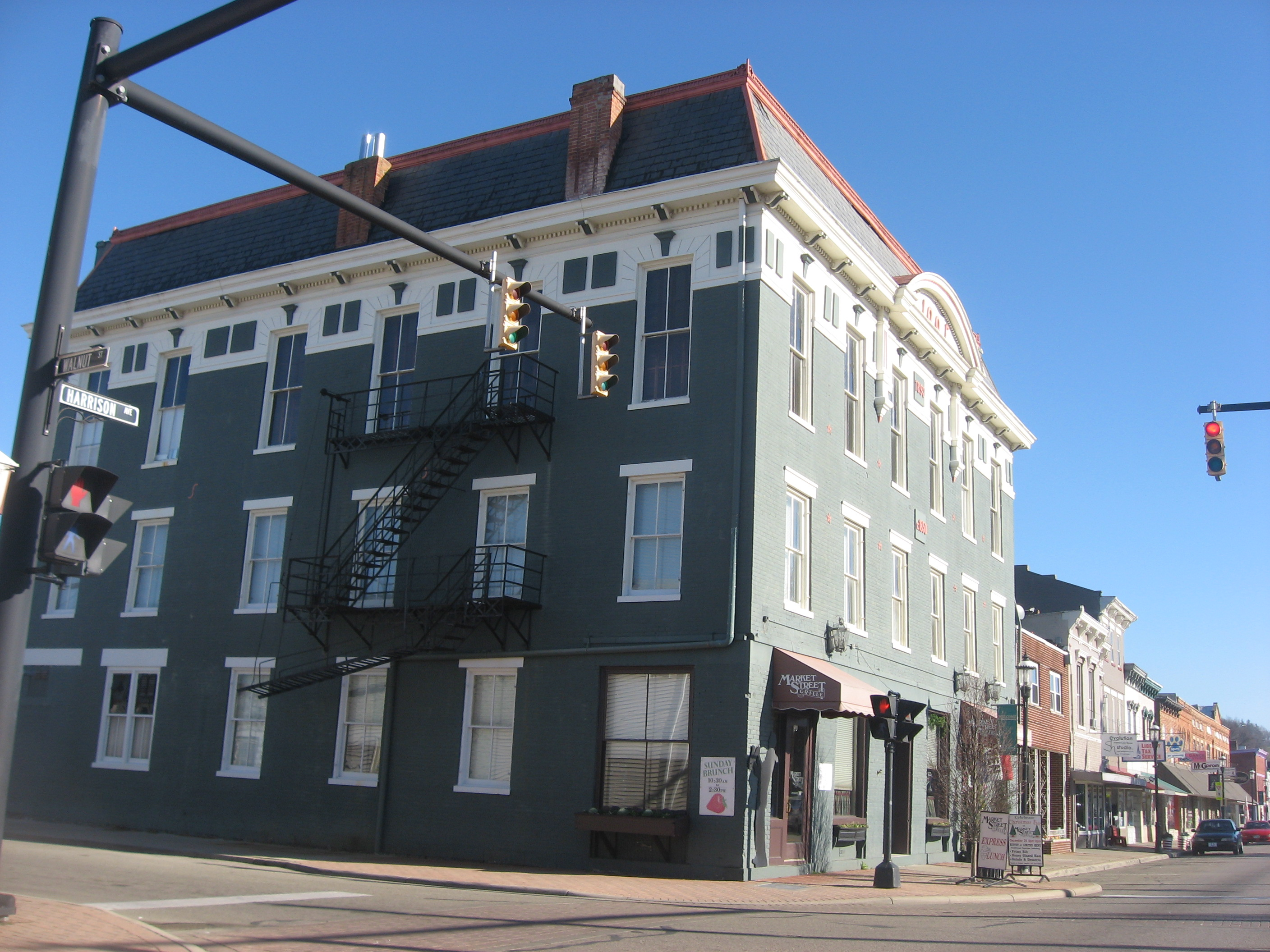
- Harrison Avenue at Walnut Street in Harrison

- Flag Logo
- Interactive map of Harrison, Ohio
- Location within Ohio Location within the United States
- Coordinates: 39°15′06″N 84°47′20″W
- Country: United States
- State: Ohio
- County: Hamilton

Government
  - Mayor: Ryan P. Grubbs (R)

Area
  - Total: 5.37 sq mi (13.91 km^{2})
  - Land: 5.34 sq mi (13.83 km^{2})
  - Water: 0.031 sq mi (0.08 km^{2})
- Elevation: 584 ft (178 m)

Population (2020)
  - Total: 12,563
  - Estimate (2025): 13,795
  - Density: 2,352.1/sq mi (908.17/km^{2})
- Time zone: UTC-5 (Eastern (EST))
  - Summer (DST): UTC-4 (EDT)
- ZIP code: 45030
- Area code: 513
- FIPS code: 39-33838
- GNIS feature ID: 2394305
- Website: www.harrisonohio.gov

Harrison is a city in western Hamilton County, Ohio, United States. The population was 12,563 at the 2020 census. It is part of the Cincinnati metropolitan area.

== History ==
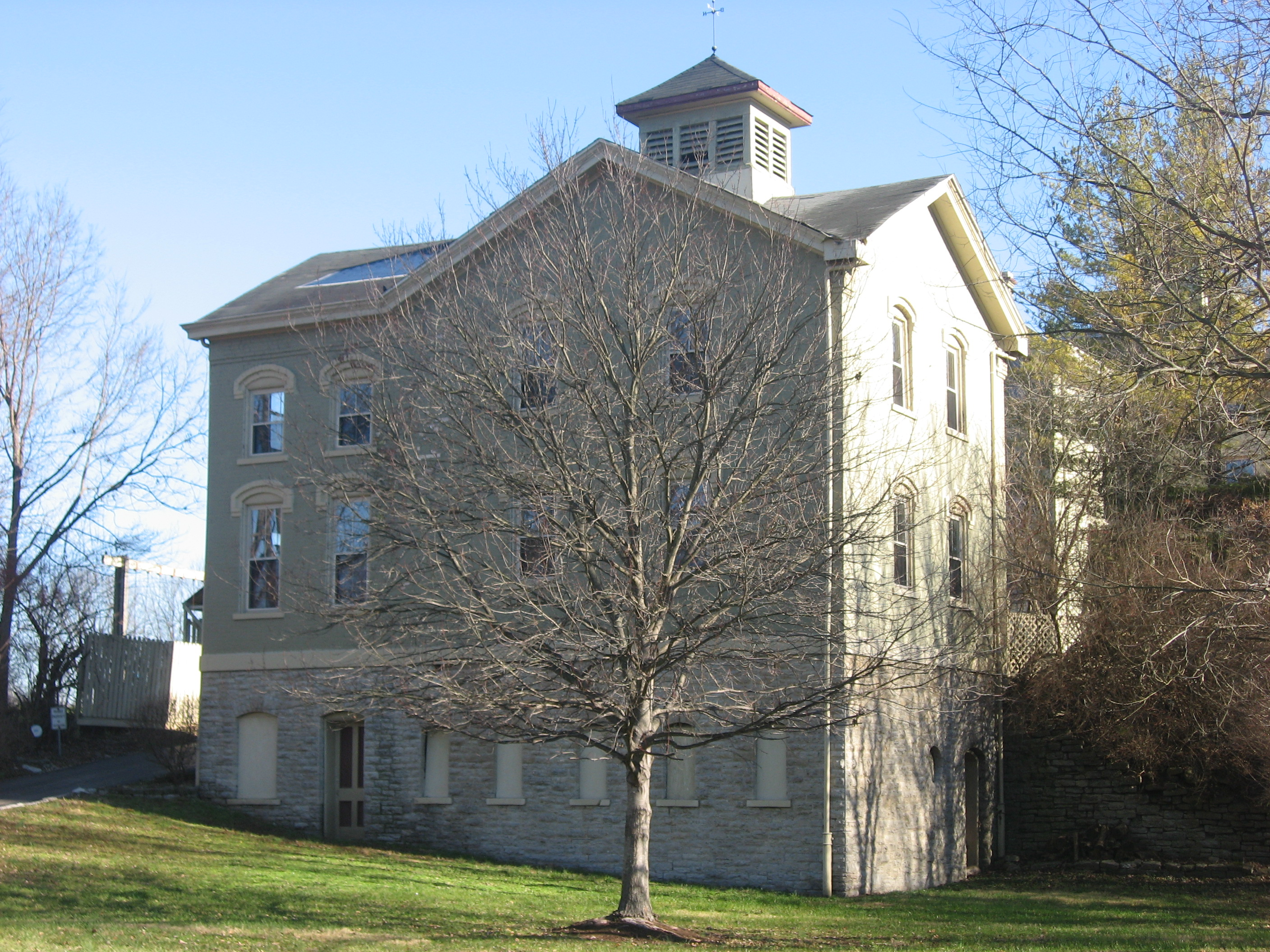
Hugh Campbell House barn

Harrison was laid out in 1810, named in honor of William Henry Harrison, a decorated general and state legislator and afterward the ninth president of the United States. It was incorporated in 1850 and became a city in 1981.

Harrison Township was established in 1853, formerly part of Crosby and Whitewater Township. Among the historic sites in the city's vicinity is the Eighteen Mile House, which was built during the earliest years of the nineteenth century.

Harrison was the home of Ohio's fifth governor Othneil Looker. It was one of the few stops in Ohio on the Whitewater Canal, built between 1836 and 1847, which spanned a distance of 76 miles (122 km).

On July 13, 1863, Morgan's Raiders, a Confederate cavalry force, invaded. The column passed through taking fresh horses and burning the bridge over the Whitewater River near the southwest part of the town. The first train came to Harrison Township in 1864. In 1882 Harrison Depot was built at West Broadway and Railroad Avenue. It later burned to the ground.

Harrison Village Park is the final resting place for a small number of veterans of the Revolutionary War. In the center of the park is a bandstand, built in the early 1930s on the site of a fountain that had been drained and filled in. It seems many children came down with cases of impetigo after spending a hot summer swimming in the fountain full of untreated water.

In 1940 the dog track in West Harrison closed due to pressure from the horse racing circuit. Monkeys in silk jackets had been used as jockeys for the dogs. The track had originally opened in 1932, when parimutuel betting was illegal in Indiana. However, during the Depression, heads were turned as the track attracted revenue to the area and was one of the highest paying local jobs at $12 a week.

Parts of the city were devastated on June 2, 1990, by an F4 tornado, but were quickly rebuilt.

Harrison is home to the headquarters of the American Watchmakers-Clockmakers Institute.

Since 2023, Harrison has a city partnership with Meckesheim in Germany.

== Geography ==
Harrison is located in northwestern Hamilton County and is bordered to the west by the town of West Harrison, Indiana.

Interstate 74 passes through the city, east of the downtown area, with access from Exits 1 and 3. I-74 leads southeast 21 miles (34 km) to Cincinnati and northwest 93 miles (150 km) to Indianapolis.

According to the United States Census Bureau, the city of Harrison has a total area of 4.96 square miles (12.85 km^{2}), of which 4.92 square miles (12.74 km^{2}) are land and 0.04 square miles (0.10 km^{2}) are water.

Harrison is adjacent to Miami Whitewater Forest, the second park to join the Hamilton County Park District in 1949. It now spans 4,345 acres (17.58 km^{2}).

== Demographics ==
Historical population
| Census | Pop. | Note | %± |
|---|---|---|---|
| 1830 | 173 | | — |
| 1850 | 940 | | — |
| 1860 | 1,343 | | 42.9% |
| 1870 | 1,417 | | 5.5% |
| 1880 | 1,560 | | 10.1% |
| 1890 | 1,690 | | 8.3% |
| 1900 | 1,456 | | −13.8% |
| 1910 | 1,368 | | −6.0% |
| 1920 | 1,309 | | −4.3% |
| 1930 | 1,449 | | 10.7% |
| 1940 | 1,656 | | 14.3% |
| 1950 | 1,943 | | 17.3% |
| 1960 | 3,878 | | 99.6% |
| 1970 | 4,408 | | 13.7% |
| 1980 | 5,855 | | 32.8% |
| 1990 | 7,518 | | 28.4% |
| 2000 | 7,487 | | −0.4% |
| 2010 | 9,897 | | 32.2% |
| 2020 | 12,563 | | 26.9% |
| 2025 (est.) | 13,795 | | 9.8% |

=== 2020 census ===
As of the 2020 census, Harrison had a population of 12,563, a population density of 2,352.18 people per square mile (908.17/km^{2}), and 5,046 housing units.

The median age was 36.2 years, 27.4% of residents were under the age of 18, and 14.9% were 65 years of age or older; for every 100 females, there were 93.5 males, and for every 100 females age 18 and over, there were 89.6 males.

There were 4,851 households in Harrison, of which 35.6% had children under the age of 18 living in them, 50.9% were married-couple households, 15.3% were households with a male householder and no spouse or partner present, and 26.3% were households with a female householder and no spouse or partner present; about 25.8% of all households were made up of individuals and 11.4% had someone living alone who was 65 years of age or older. The average household size was 2.61 and the average family size was 3.12.

Of the 5,046 housing units, 3.9% were vacant, with a homeowner vacancy rate of 0.8% and a rental vacancy rate of 4.0%.

Racial composition as of the 2020 census
| Race | Number | Percent |
|---|---|---|
| White | 11,720 | 93.3% |
| Black or African American | 95 | 0.8% |
| American Indian and Alaska Native | 31 | 0.2% |
| Asian | 95 | 0.8% |
| Native Hawaiian and Other Pacific Islander | 4 | 0.0% |
| Some other race | 64 | 0.5% |
| Two or more races | 554 | 4.4% |
| Hispanic or Latino (of any race) | 196 | 1.6% |

99.9% of residents lived in urban areas, while 0.1% lived in rural areas.

According to the U.S. Census American Community Survey, for the period 2016-2020 the estimated median annual income for a household in the city was $88,943, and the median income for a family was $100,984; about 4.8% of the population were living below the poverty line, including 5.6% of those under age 18 and 14.5% of those age 65 or over, about 75.7% of the population were employed, and 27.1% had a bachelor's degree or higher.

=== 2010 census ===
At the 2010 census there were 9,897 people in 3,765 households, including 2,659 families, in the city. The population density was 2,011.6 inhabitants per square mile (776.7/km^{2}). There were 4,054 housing units at an average density of 824.0 per square mile (318.1/km^{2}). The racial makeup of the city was 97.6% White, 0.3% African American, 0.2% Native American, 0.6% Asian, 0.5% from other races, and 0.8% from two or more races. Hispanic or Latino of any race were 1.1%.

Of the 3,765 households, 37.8% had children under the age of 18 living with them, 51.7% were married couples living together, 13.8% had a female householder with no husband present, 5.2% had a male householder with no wife present, and 29.4% were non-families. 23.7% of households were one person, and 9.3% were one person aged 65 or older. The average household size was 2.63 and the average family size was 3.12.

The median age was 34.7 years. 26.2% of residents were under the age of 18; 9.9% were between the ages of 18 and 24; 28.1% were from 25 to 44; 24.3% were from 45 to 64; and 11.3% were 65 or older. The gender makeup of the city was 48.7% male and 51.3% female.

=== 2000 census ===
At the 2000 census there were 7,487 people in 2,717 households, including 2,005 families, in the city. The population density was 2,024.5 inhabitants per square mile (781.7/km^{2}). There were 2,847 housing units at an average density of 769.8 per square mile (297.2/km^{2}). The racial makeup of the city was 98.18% White, 0.17% African American, 0.09% Native American, 0.39% Asian, 0.01% Pacific Islander, 0.20% from other races, and 0.95% from two or more races. Hispanic or Latino of any race were 0.52%.

Of the 2,717 households, 41.4% had children under the age of 18 living with them, 57.6% were married couples living together, 11.7% had a female householder with no husband present, and 26.2% were non-families. 22.3% of households were one person, and 8.6% were one person aged 65 or older. The average household size was 2.75 and the average family size was 3.26.

In the city the population was spread out, with 29.9% under the age of 18, 9.9% from 18 to 24, 31.4% from 25 to 44, 19.4% from 45 to 64, and 9.3% 65 or older. The median age was 32 years. For every 100 females, there were 93.7 males. For every 100 females age 18 and over, there were 91.3 males.

The median household income was $46,107 and the median family income was $54,028. Males had a median income of $37,455 versus $27,418 for females. The per capita income for the city was $17,966. About 4.3% of families and 6.8% of the population were below the poverty line, including 5.6% of those under age 18 and 5.0% of those age 65 or over.

== Education ==
- William Henry Harrison High School is located in Harrison. The school is part of the Southwest Local School District, which encompasses Harrison Township, Crosby Township, and Whitewater Township in Hamilton County as well as a small section of Morgan Township in southwest Butler County.
- Cincinnati State Technical and Community College West Campus is located in Harrison.
- St. John the Baptist Harrison is a Roman Catholic school. There are 305 students in the school from preschool through eighth grade. The athletic nickname for the school is the Jaguars. The official colors are red and black.

== Infrastructure ==
=== Transportation ===
Cincinnati West Airport is located two nautical miles (2.3 mi; 3.7 km) east of Harrison's central business district.

== Notable people ==
- Harriet Ball Dunlap, temperance leader

== See also ==
- Whitewater Canal
