= Miamitown, Ohio =

- Census-designated place
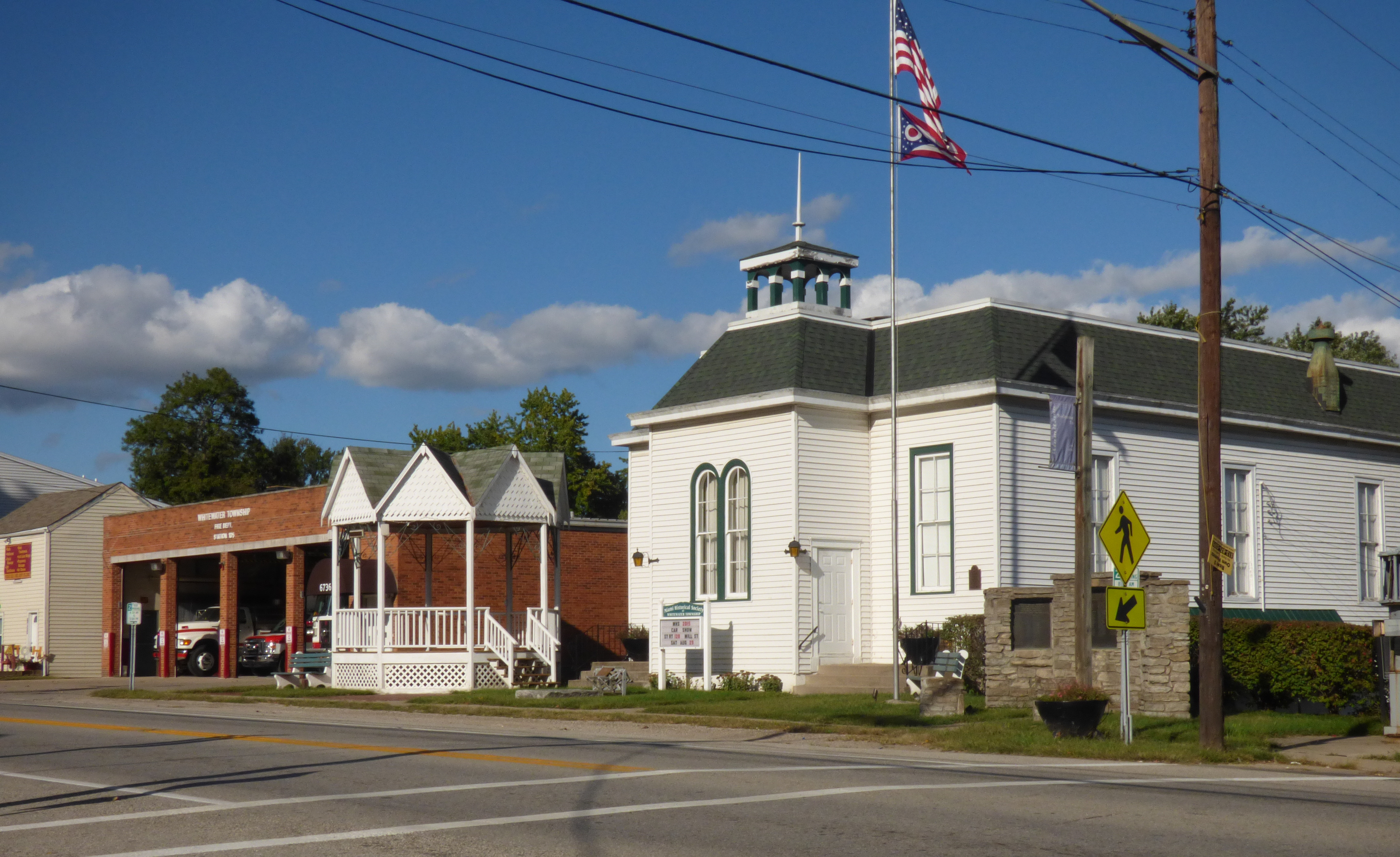
- Whitewater Historical Society and Fire Station in Miamitown

- Location in Hamilton County and the state of Ohio
- Coordinates: 39°13′01″N 84°42′34″W
- Country: United States
- State: Ohio
- County: Hamilton

Area
  - Total: 1.37 sq mi (3.54 km^{2})
  - Land: 1.34 sq mi (3.47 km^{2})
  - Water: 0.027 sq mi (0.07 km^{2})
- Elevation: 682 ft (208 m)

Population (2020)
  - Total: 1,256
  - Density: 937.9/sq mi (362.14/km^{2})
- Time zone: UTC-5 (Eastern (EST))
  - Summer (DST): UTC-4 (EDT)
- ZIP code: 45041
- FIPS code: 39-49462
- GNIS feature ID: 2585514

Miamitown is a census-designated place (CDP) in western Whitewater Township, Hamilton County, Ohio, United States. The population was 1,256 at the 2020 census. It has a post office with the ZIP code 45041.

== History ==
Miamitown was founded in 1816 by Arthur Henry, who operated a flour mill and distillery. The community was named after the nearby Great Miami River.

== Geography ==
Miamitown is located 16 miles (26 km) northwest of downtown Cincinnati. It is situated on the west bank of the Great Miami River at the intersection of Harrison Pike and Ohio State Route 128 (Hamilton Cleves Pike Road). Interstate 74 runs along the southern edge of the village, with access to it via Exit 7.

According to the United States Census Bureau, the CDP has a total area of 1.37 square miles (3.54 km^{2}), of which 1.34 square miles (3.48 km^{2}) is land and 0.023 square miles (0.06 km^{2}), or 1.72%, is water.

== Demographics ==
As of the census of 2020, there were 1,256 people living in the CDP, for a population density of 938.01 people per square mile (362.14/km^{2}). There were 655 housing units. The racial makeup of the CDP was 87.2% White, 3.1% Black or African American, 0.3% Native American, 0.2% Asian, 0.1% Pacific Islander, 2.1% from some other race, and 7.1% from two or more races. 4.1% of the population were Hispanic or Latino of any race.

There were 607 households, out of which 21.9% had children under the age of 18 living with them, 7.9% were married couples living together, 39.4% had a male householder with no spouse present, and 28.5% had a female householder with no spouse present. 58.5% of all households were made up of individuals, and 28.6% were someone living alone who was 65 years of age or older. The average household size was 1.97, and the average family size was 4.04.

22.6% of the CDP's population were under the age of 18, 62.8% were 18 to 64, and 14.6% were 65 years of age or older. The median age was 25.6. For every 100 females, there were 93.7 males.

According to the U.S. Census American Community Survey, for the period 2016-2020 the estimated median annual income for a household in the CDP was $61,985. About 22.0% of the population were living below the poverty line, including 61.5% of those under age 18 and 0.0% of those age 65 or over. About 63.4% of the population were employed, and 12.7% had a bachelor's degree or higher.
