= Eighteen Mile House =

Historic house in Ohio, United States

- U.S. National Register of Historic Places
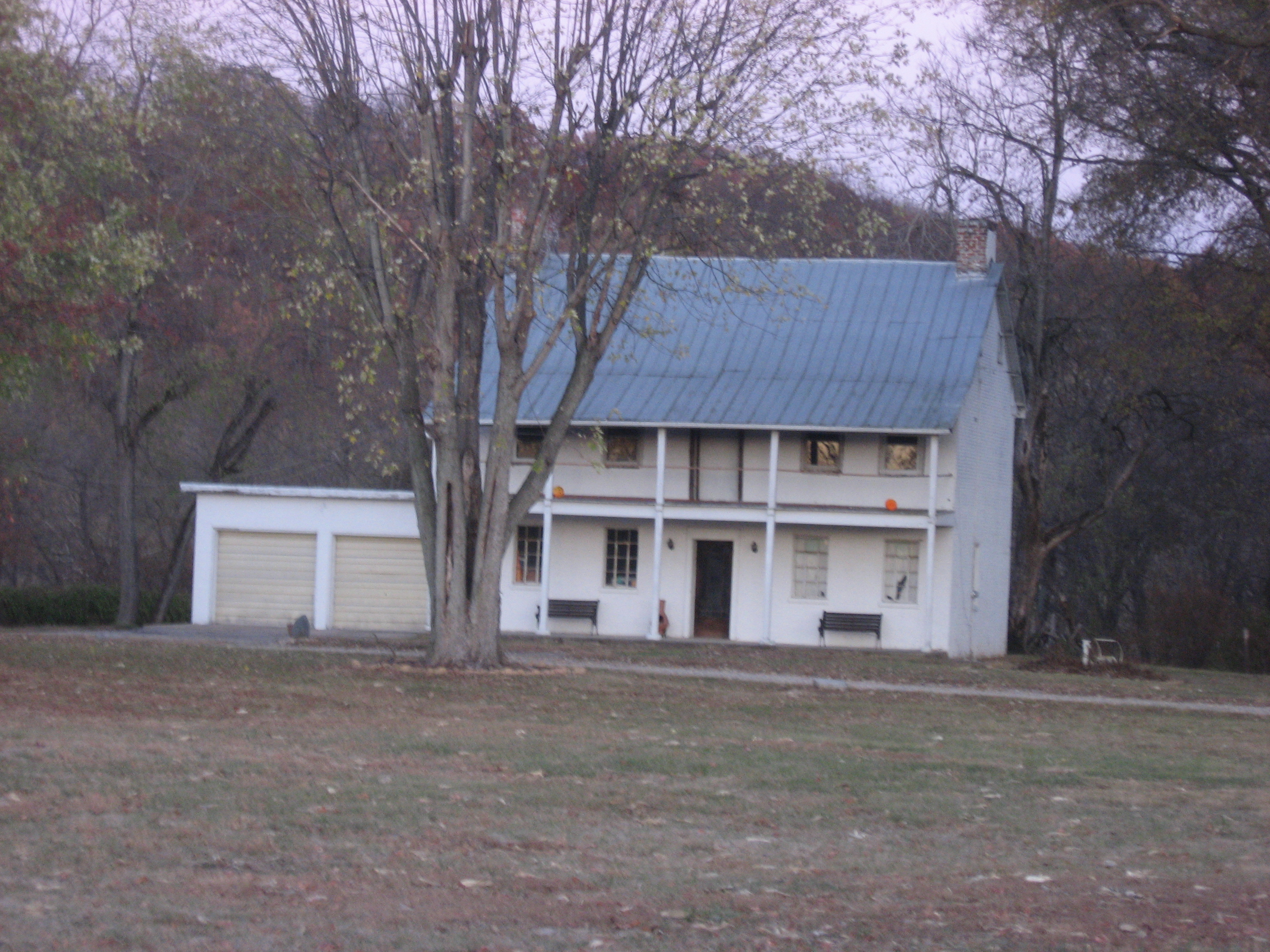
- Front of the house

- Location within Ohio Location within the United States
- Nearest city: Harrison, Ohio
- Coordinates: 39°14′18″N 84°46′6″W
- Area: Less than 1 acre (0.40 ha)
- Built: 1800
- NRHP reference No.: 75001427
- Added to NRHP: October 10, 1975

The Eighteen Mile House is a historic house near the city of Harrison in western Hamilton County, Ohio, United States. Built as a tavern by unknown individuals in the early years of the nineteenth century, its construction date is unknown: some hold it to have been erected in 1800, others in 1815, and yet others at a vague date between 1800 and 1810.

Constructed of brick, the two-and-one-half-story house is covered by a tin roof. Among its most distinctive elements are the gables on the ends, the interior chimneys that rise from above these gables, and a two-story porch on the western front. It was originally erected near a gate on the toll road between Cincinnati and Brookville, Indiana; its name is derived from its location, approximately eighteen miles from Cincinnati in the city's early years. Besides serving its purpose as a tavern and thus an inn, the Eighteen Mile House operated as a post office in its first years of existence. As time passed, the house was modified at an unknown date under the supervision of an unknown individual, being expanded on its northern side.

During the middle of the nineteenth century, the Civil War directly affected the Eighteen Mile House twice. According to local legend, Abraham Lincoln stayed in the house at least once, while Morgan's Raiders attacked the property in the middle of 1863. As time passed, the house became more and more a survivor of old times, and for this reason it was listed on the National Register of Historic Places in 1975. It qualified for the Register both because of its distinctive historic architecture and because of its place in Ohio's history.
