= Cincinnati West Airport =

Airport in Harrison, Ohio, US

- IATA: none; ICAO: none; FAA LID: I67

Summary
- Airport type: Public
- Owner: Cincinnati State Technical and Community College
- Serves: Harrison, Ohio
- Opened: 1947
- Time zone: UTC−05:00 (-5)
  - Summer (DST): UTC−04:00 (-4)
- Elevation AMSL: 583.8 ft (177.9 m)
- Coordinates: 39°15′33″N 84°46′28″W
- Website: Cincinnati West Airport

Map
- Location of airport in Ohio I67 (the United States)

Runways
Direction	Length		Surface
Direction	ft	m	Surface
01/19	2,803	854	Asphalt

Statistics (2014)
- Aircraft operations: 28,470
- Based aircraft: 46
- Source: Federal Aviation Administration

Cincinnati West Airport (FAA LID: I67), formerly Harrison Airport, is a general aviation airport in Harrison, Ohio, United States. Cincinnati West is located 2 nautical miles (3.7 km) east of Harrison's central business district and about 15 nautical miles (28 km) northwest of Downtown Cincinnati. It can be accessed from Interstate 74. The airport is owned by Cincinnati State Technical and Community College. Its fixed-base operator is Whitewater Aviation.

== History ==
Cincinnati West Airport began in 1939 when Orville and Alvin Jackson plowed an airstrip through a hayfield owned by Woiden Radcliffe. It officially opened in 1947 as Harrison Airport. Runway lights were installed in 1954.

A 1969 proposal called for the privately owned Harrison Airport to be expanded for use as Cincinnati's executive airport, after plans to expand Blue Ash Airport into a reliever for Greater Cincinnati Airport were blocked by local opposition. However, Harrison Airport's proximity to William Henry Harrison High School and Harrison Junior High School complicated any expansion plans. Instead, the runway was reconfigured to avoid the schools.

The Windecker Eagle, the first composite airplane to be certified by the Federal Aviation Administration, was designed and built at the airport in the late 1970s.

The Village of Harrison considered buying the airport in 1977. Morton Rabkin purchased Harrison Airport in 1981. An adjacent property was developed as a residential subdivision, ending his plans to extend the runway to 3,500 feet (1,100 m). In 1986, he renamed the airport to Cincinnati West Airport and sold it to Bob McKenna.

In 1995, the city of Harrison annexed Cincinnati West Airport. That August, Cincinnati State Technical and Community College purchased the airport from McKenna Air Inc. to support its federally approved, two-year aviation maintenance technologies program. It spent $4.14 million in state funds to purchase and renovate the facilities. In 1998, the school opened a Cincinnati State West satellite campus next door.

== Facilities and aircraft ==
Cincinnati West Airport covers an area of 27 acres (11 ha) at an elevation of 583.8 feet (177.9 m) above mean sea level. It has one asphalt-paved runway: 01/19 is 2,803 by 60 feet (854 by 18 m). The airport operates an Automated Weather Observation System.

For the 12-month period ending October 11, 2023, the airport had 28,470 aircraft operations, an average of 78 per day. This was 99% general aviation, less than 1% air taxi, and less than 1% military. For the same time period, 46 aircraft were based at the airport, all airplanes: 42 single-engine and 4 multi-engine. The airport is attended daily, year-round.

The airport has a fixed-base operator that sells avgas.

== Accidents and incidents ==
- On August 8, 1981, a fire destroyed a hangar and four planes and seriously damaged two others.
- On October 10, 2004, a Cessna 172 and a Cessna 152 practicing landings at the airport collided midair and landed in a gravel pit across the street, injuring two.
- On August 21, 2009, a Steen Skybolt was destroyed by an in-flight collision with terrain after departure from Cincinnati West Airport. A witness saw the plane flying low to the ground before entering a "very steep climb" of 45-50 degrees. The climb continued to approximately 200 feet above the ground, at which point it entered a left turn until it became inverted with the nose pointed straight down. The plane then entered a spin and impacted terrain. The probable cause of the accident was found to be the pilot's failure to maintain adequate airspeed, which resulted in an aerodynamic stall.

== See also ==
- List of airports in Ohio
