= Whitewater Township, Hamilton County, Ohio =

Township in Ohio, US

- Township
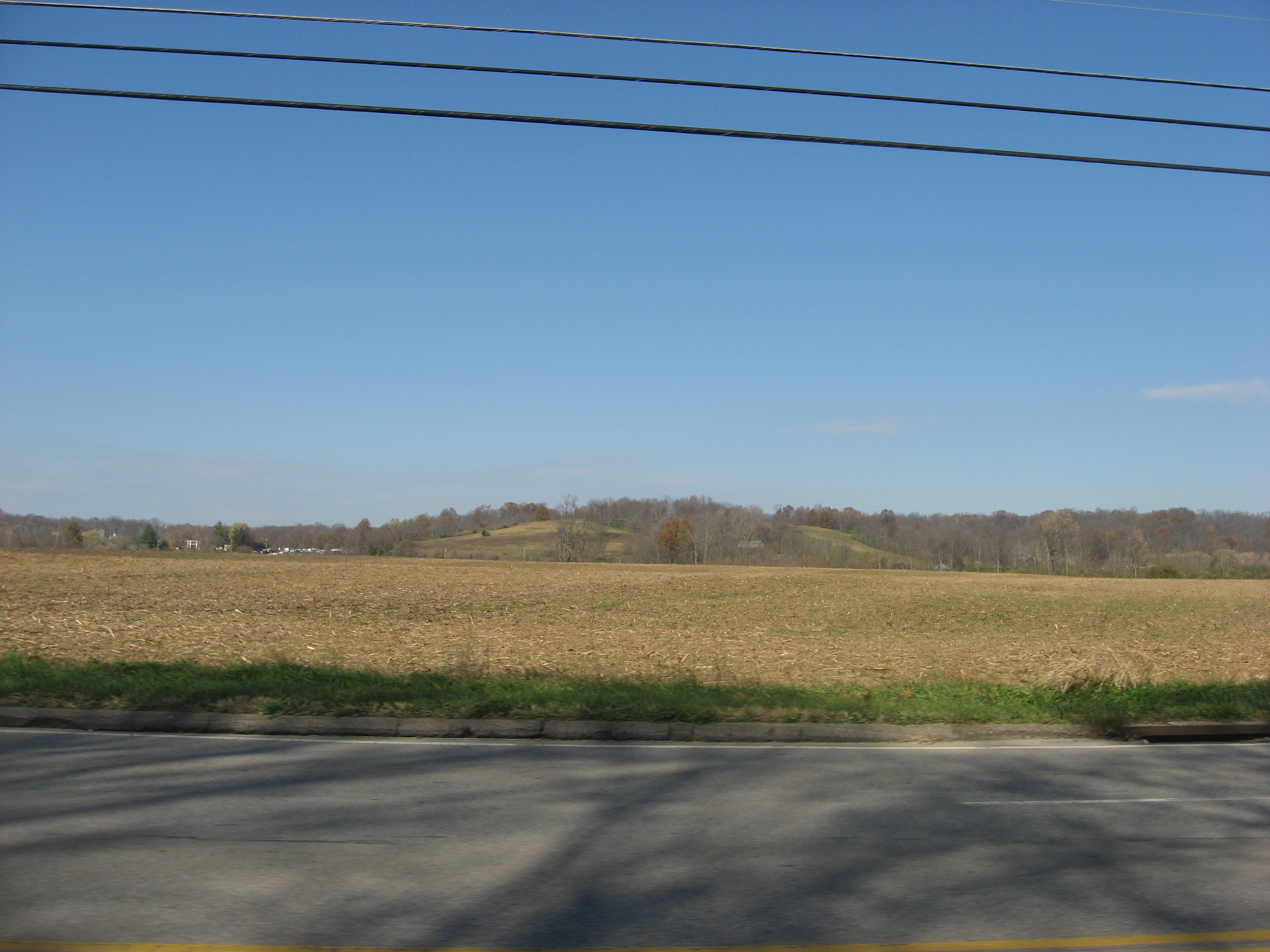
- Countryside along U.S. Route 50

- Location in Hamilton County and the state of Ohio.
- Coordinates: 39°11′50″N 84°45′51″W
- Country: United States
- State: Ohio
- County: Hamilton

Area
  - Total: 26.3 sq mi (68.2 km^{2})
  - Land: 25.4 sq mi (65.7 km^{2})
  - Water: 1.0 sq mi (2.6 km^{2})
- Elevation: 509 ft (155 m)

Population (2020)
  - Total: 6,375
  - Density: 251.3/sq mi (97.03/km^{2})
- Time zone: UTC-5 (Eastern (EST))
  - Summer (DST): UTC-4 (EDT)
- FIPS code: 39-84938
- GNIS feature ID: 1086235
- Website: www.whitewatertwp.org

Whitewater Township is one of the twelve townships of Hamilton County, Ohio, United States. The population was 6,375 as of the 2020 census.

== Name and history ==
It is the only Whitewater Township statewide.

== Geography ==
Located in the western part of the county, it borders the following townships:

- Harrison Township - north
- Crosby Township - northeast, west of Colerain Township
- Colerain Township - northeast, east of Crosby Township
- Miami Township - southeast
- Lawrenceburg Township, Dearborn County, Indiana - southwest
- Miller Township, Dearborn County, Indiana - west
- Harrison Township, Dearborn County, Indiana - northwest corner

No municipalities are located in Whitewater Township, although four unincorporated census-designated places lie in the township: Elizabethtown in the southwest, Hooven in the southeast, Blue Jay in the north, and Miamitown in the east.

== Demographics ==
Historical population
Census	Pop.	Note	%±
1820	1,661		—
1850	1,344		—
1860	1,421		5.7%
1870	1,609		13.2%
1880	1,575		−2.1%
1890	1,317		−16.4%
1900	1,291		−2.0%
1910	1,337		3.6%
1920	1,467		9.7%
1930	1,567		6.8%
1940	1,964		25.3%
1950	2,091		6.5%
1960	2,883		37.9%
1970	3,318		15.1%
1980	4,662		40.5%
1990	5,178		11.1%
2000	5,564		7.5%
2010	5,519		−0.8%
2020	6,375		15.5%

=== 2020 census ===
As of the census of 2020, there were 6,375 people living in the township, for a population density of 251.3 people per square mile (97.0/km^{2}). There were 2,791 housing units. The racial makeup of the township was 90.3% White, 1.8% Black or African American, 0.2% Native American, 0.3% Asian, 0.1% Pacific Islander, 1.5% from some other race, and 5.9% from two or more races. 3.6% of the population were Hispanic or Latino of any race.

There were 2,562 households, out of which 30.2% had children under the age of 18 living with them, 41.9% were married couples living together, 21.0% had a male householder with no spouse present, and 24.9% had a female householder with no spouse present. 30.4% of all households were made up of individuals, and 15.5% were someone living alone who was 65 years of age or older. The average household size was 2.43, and the average family size was 3.15.

25.2% of the township's population were under the age of 18, 57.8% were 18 to 64, and 17.0% were 65 years of age or older. The median age was 38.5. For every 100 females, there were 87.4 males.

According to the U.S. Census American Community Survey, for the period 2016-2020 the estimated median annual income for a household in the township was $55,957, and the median income for a family was $66,878. About 17.3% of the population were living below the poverty line, including 27.4% of those under age 18 and 6.0% of those age 65 or over. About 60.1% of the population were employed, and 16.0% had a bachelor's degree or higher.

== Government ==
The township is governed by a three-member board of trustees, who are elected in November of odd-numbered years to a four-year term beginning on the following January 1. Two are elected in the year after the presidential election and one is elected in the year before it. There is also an elected township fiscal officer, who serves a four-year term beginning on April 1 of the year after the election, which is held in November of the year before the presidential election. Vacancies in the fiscal officership or on the board of trustees are filled by the remaining trustees.

== See also ==
- Long Island Beach
