= Long Island Beach =

Former amusement park

- Interactive map of Long Island Beach
- Location: Whitewater Township, Ohio, USA
- Coordinates: 39.18222°N 84.79111°W
- Status: Defunct
- Opened: 1924
- Closed: 1956

Long Island Beach is a former amusement park located in Whitewater Township, Hamilton County, Ohio.

The property was acquired by John Pope in 1888, and in 1924, John's son and daughter-in-law, Earl and Dolores Pope opened a park on the site. The park, often compared to a miniature Coney Island was in operation from 1924 through 1956.

The park's attractions included hand powered rides, swimming (with more than a mile of beaches), bingo, camping, ball fields and dances. The park was also the location for big bands to play and entertain. Entertainers such as Rosemary Clooney and Spike Jones were amongst those who performed there. Long Island Beach was a favorite location for company picnics from local firms and would often host more than 1,000 visitors per day. In its early years, visitors would travel by streetcar from nearby Cincinnati to find relief from the heat of the day by picnicking or swimming in the Whitewater River.

Long Island Beach closed in 1956 due to competition from city swimming pools and local park districts which has been established. The Pope family converted the property back to farm production. In 1998, however, the family once again opened up the site for river recreation, in the form of a canoe rental firm named Green Acres.
