= Cincinnati State Technical and Community College =

College in Cincinnati, Ohio, U.S.

Cincinnati State Technical & Community College
- Former name: Cincinnati Technical College (1969–1994)
- Motto: You Can
- Type: Public community college and technical college
- Established: 1969; 57 years ago
- Parent institution: University System of Ohio
- President: Monica Posey
- Provost: Robbin Hoopes
- Students: 9,400
- Location: Cincinnati, Ohio, U.S. 39°8′59″N 84°32′12″W
- Campus: Urban
- Colors: Green, black, grey
- Mascot: Surge the Wolf
- Website: www.cincinnatistate.edu

Cincinnati State Technical and Community College (CSTCC, CincyState, or Cincinnati State) is a public technical and community college in Cincinnati, Ohio, United States. It is accredited by the Higher Learning Commission, and is a member of the Strategic Ohio Council for Higher Education (SOCHE).

== History ==
Chartered by the Ohio Board of Regents in 1969, Cincinnati State was originally Cincinnati Technical College (CTC). Its campus was once the home of Central Vocational High School and Courter Technical High School, which both belonged to the Cincinnati Public School District. Cincinnati State was the first technical/community college in Ohio to completely ban smoking from campus buildings. It was also the first community college to make cooperative education a mandatory requirement.

In 1993, Cincinnati State broke ground on the Health Professions Building to facilitate the growing nursing program and Health Professions faculty. In 2004, the Advanced Technology & Learning Center opened, housing multi-media centers, classrooms, professional kitchens for the Midwest Culinary Institute, the Overlook Cafeteria, the Summit Restaurant, and many student services.

== Academics ==
Cincinnati State offers over 150 degree programss and certificates, including three bachelor degrees: Culinary and Food Sciences, Land Surveying, and an RN to BSN Completion Program.

It is home to the Midwest Culinary Institute.

Cooperative education and clinical practice are important parts of the school's curriculum. It has one of the ten largest co-op education programs in the nation, as measured by the number of student placements.

=== High school outreach ===
The Cincinnati Academic League (CAL) and Greater Cincinnati Academic League (GCAL), two high school quiz bowl leagues run by faculty member Ed Sunderhaus, have held matches and tournaments at Cincinnati State since the 1990s. The Cincinnati Academic League consists of teams from Cincinnati Country Day Upper School, Cincinnati Hills Christian Academy High School, Finneytown High School, Indian Hill High School, Madeira High School, North College Hill High School, Reading High School, Seven Hills Upper School, Summit Country Day Upper School, and Wyoming High School. The Greater Cincinnati Academic League, meanwhile, consists of schools from the Greater Catholic League and Girls Greater Cincinnati League of the Archdiocese of Cincinnati, plus Oldenburg Academy.

== Campuses ==
Cincinnati State's main campus is located at 3520 Central Parkway, near the junction of Interstates 74 and 75. The college also operates satellite campuses in Middletown, Harrison, and Evendale. The Cincinnati West campus, located at the college-owned Cincinnati West Airport in Harrison, offers classes in aviation maintenance technologies. In 2025 the Harrison campus began plans for a $7.6 million dollar campus expansion

== Athletics ==
Cincinnati State's mascot is the "Surge". The college was a member of the Ohio Community College Athletic Conference of the National Junior College Athletic Association.

In 2015, Cincinnati State won the NJCAA D3 National Championships in Men's Golf in Chautauqua, NY under head coach Scott Webb.

Cincinnati State eliminated all sports except for men's & women's soccer for the 2017–18 season. All sports were suspended due to the COVID-19 pandemic and a deteriorating gymnasium. The gymnasium was remodeled in 2023.

=== State championships ===
State Championships won by Central High School prior to closing include:

- Boys Cross Country - 1949
- Boys Track - 1950, 1951

== Notable alumni ==
- John Williamson (born 1986), professional basketball player
