= SunTrust Building =

SunTrust Building may refer to:

- SunTrust Plaza in Atlanta, Georgia
- SunTrust Building in Atlanta, Georgia
- SunTrust Center in Orlando, Florida
- SunTrust Financial Centre in Tampa, Florida
- SunTrust International Center in Miami, Florida
- SunTrust Building (Nashville) in Nashville, Tennessee
- SunTrust Plaza (Nashville) in Nashville, Tennessee
- SunTrust Plaza (Richmond) in Richmond, Virginia
