= Joel Owsley Cheek =

American businessman and philanthropist

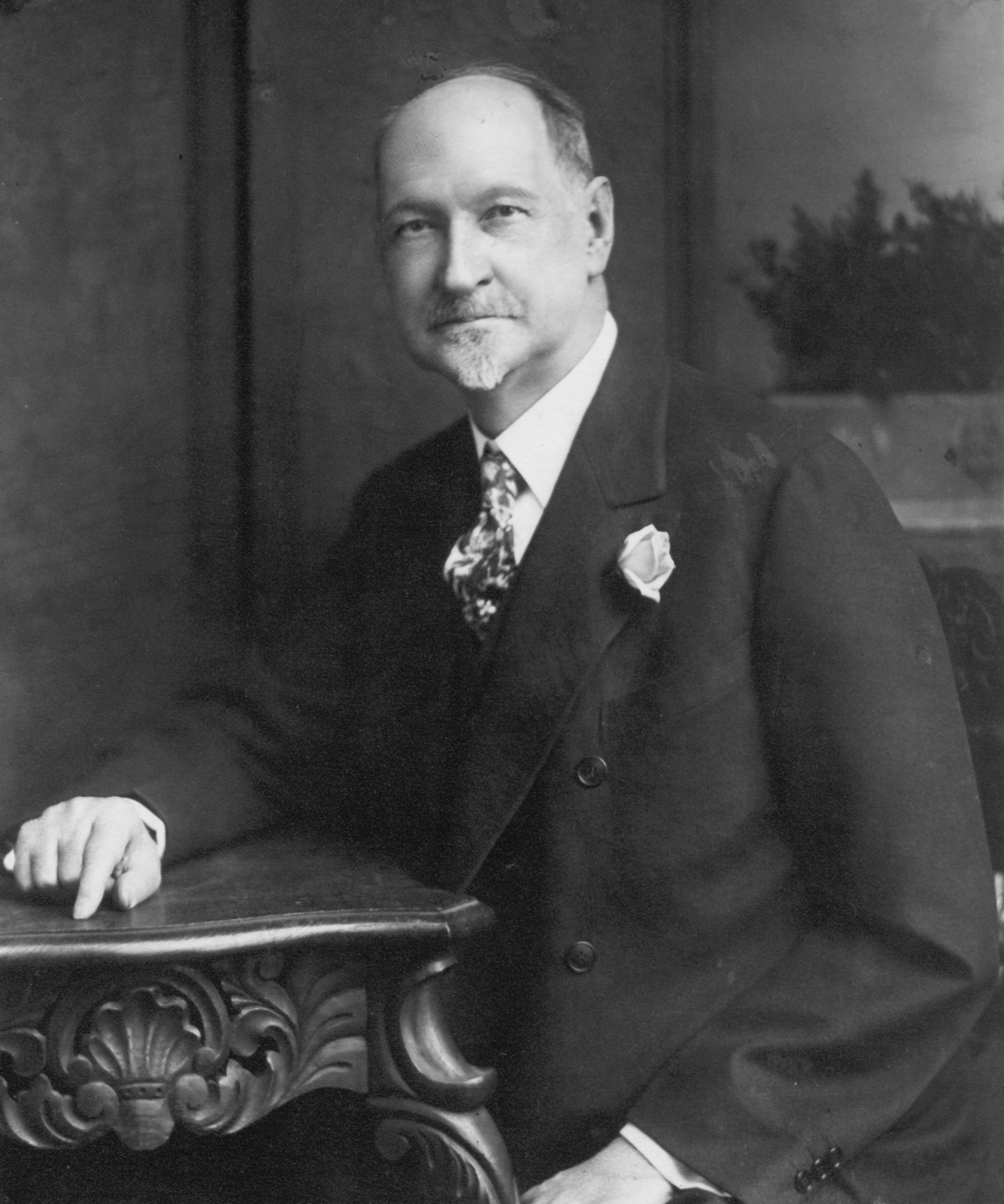
- Born: December 8, 1852; Burkesville, Kentucky, U.S.
- Died: December 14, 1935 (aged 83); Jacksonville, Florida, U.S.
- Education: Transylvania University
- Occupations: Businessman; philanthropist; founder of Maxwell House
- Spouse: Minnie Ritchey
- Children: 11

Joel Owsley Cheek (December 8, 1852 – December 14, 1935) was an American businessman and philanthropist. He was the founder of the Maxwell House coffee brand.

== Early life ==
Cheek was born on December 8, 1852, in Burkesville, Kentucky. He attended Transylvania University in 1868.

== Career ==
Cheek began his career as a school teacher. After two years he became a traveling salesman for the Webb Wholesale Grocery Company Tennessee and Kentucky. Cheek invested in the company, and it became known as Cheek, Webb & Co.

With investors L. T. Webb, J. J. Norton and J. W. Neal, Cheek opened a coffee shop in Downtown Nashville in 1901. Cheek persuaded the owners of the Maxwell House Hotel to serve their coffee; after a favorable reception, the hotel allowed the company to use its name for its cofee. Maxwell House coffee began using the slogan "good to the last drop" in 1917. In 1928, Cheek sold the brand to Postum Co. for $42 million; it was subsequently purchased by General Foods. However, he was featured in Maxwell House advertisements until his death.

== Philanthropy ==
Cheek served on the Board of Trustees for the George Peabody College for Teachers (now part of Vanderbilt University) and contributed liberally to the institution. Additionally, he founded the Nashville Conservatory of Music.

== Personal life, death and legacy ==
Cheek married Minnie Ritchey in 1873. The couple had eleven children. He resided in Nashville, Tennessee: first at 513 Woodland Street in East Nashville and later 209 Louise Avenue near Centennial Park and Vanderbilt University. His cousins were the owners of Cheekwood, which later became a museum. Cheek was a Christian, and a strong advocate of prohibition. He never smoked or drank.

Cheek died on December 14, 1935, in Jacksonville, Florida. His portrait hangs in the Cumberland County Library in Burkesville, KY.
