= Cheekwood Botanical Garden and Museum of Art =

Historic estate in Nashville, Tennessee

- Cheekwood
- U.S. National Register of Historic Places
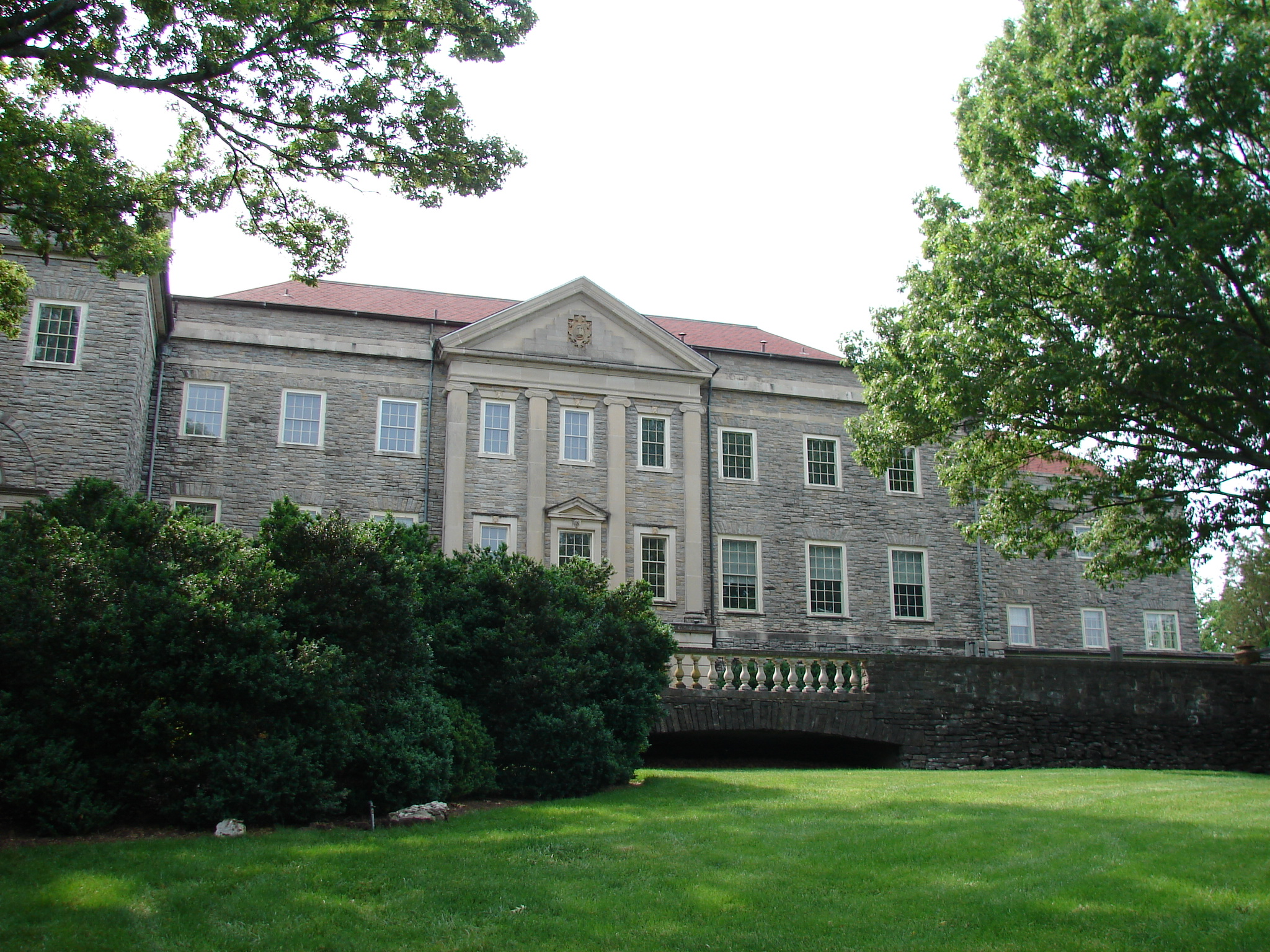
- Cheekwood Mansion

- Location within Tennessee Location within the United States
- Location: 1200 Forest Park Dr., Nashville, Tennessee
- Coordinates: 36°5′12″N 86°52′26″W
- Area: 7 acres (2.8 ha)
- Built: 1929
- Architect: Bryant Fleming; et al.
- Architectural style: Colonial Revival
- Website: cheekwood.org
- NRHP reference No.: 00000993
- Added to NRHP: August 23, 2000

Cheekwood is a 55-acre (22 ha) historic estate on the western edge of Nashville, Tennessee, that houses the Cheekwood Estate & Gardens. Formerly the residence of Nashville's Cheek family, the 30,000-square-foot (2,800 m^{2}) Georgian-style mansion was opened as a botanical garden and art museum in 1960.

== History ==
Christopher Cheek founded a wholesale grocery business in Nashville in the 1880s. His son, Leslie Cheek, joined him as a partner, and by 1915 was president of the family-owned company. Leslie's wife, Mabel Wood, was a member of a prominent Clarksville, Tennessee, family. Meanwhile, Joel Owsley Cheek, Leslie's cousin, had developed an acclaimed blend of coffee that was marketed through Nashville's finest hotel, the Maxwell House Hotel. Cheek's extended family, including Leslie and Mabel Cheek, were investors. In 1928, the Postum Cereals Company (now General Foods) purchased Maxwell House's parent company, Cheek-Neal Coffee, for more than $40 million.

After the sale of the family business, Leslie Cheek bought 100 acres (40 ha) of woodland in West Nashville for a country estate. He hired New York residential and landscape architect Bryant Fleming to design the house and gardens, and gave him full control over every detail of the project, including interior furnishings. The resulting limestone mansion and extensive formal gardens were completed in 1932. The estate design was inspired by the grand Georgian manors of 18th century England.

Leslie Cheek died just two years after moving into the mansion. Mabel Cheek and their daughter, Huldah Cheek Sharp, lived at Cheekwood until the 1950s, when Huldah Sharp and her husband offered the property as a site for a botanical garden and art museum. The Exchange Club of Nashville, the Horticultural Society of Middle Tennessee and other civic groups led the redevelopment of the property aided by funds raised from the sale of the former building of the defunct Nashville Museum of Art. The new Cheekwood museum opened in 1960.

== Art museum ==
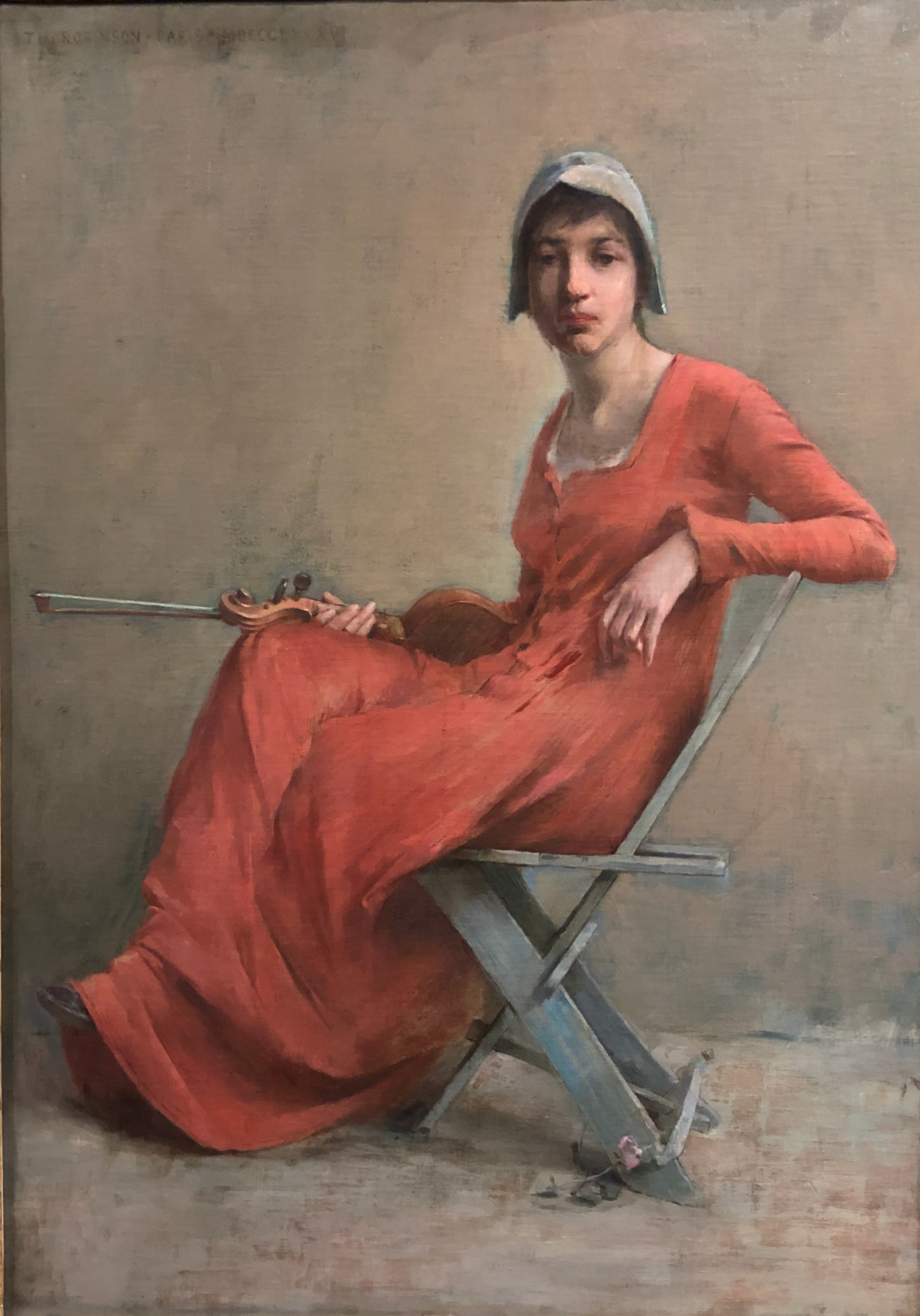
A work by American artist Theodore Robinson (1852-1896)

Cheekwood's art collection was founded in 1959 upon the holdings of the former Nashville Museum of Art and is accredited by the American Alliance of Museums. The core holdings include broad collections of American art; American and British decorative arts; contemporary art, especially outdoor sculpture acquired for the Woodland Sculpture Trail.

Cheekwood's American art collection includes 600 paintings and 5,000 prints, drawings and photographs. The collection, assembled in the 1980s and early 1990s through a multimillion-dollar bequest, spans the history of American art. Its strength centers on The Eight. Other strengths include the world's largest collection of sculptures of William Edmondson, photographs by Louise Dahl-Wolfe, and a vast variety of post-Second World War prints. Recently, the Museum has pursued a consciously focused acquisition process, having added paintings by James Hamilton, William Bradford, and new contemporary sculpture for the Trail.

The core holdings of the decorative arts collection include the third-largest Worcester porcelain in the United States, and a 650-piece silver collection, spanning the 18th-20th centuries.

The Cheek Mansion is itself considered part of the collection. A year-long renovation, completed in June 2017, restored much of the original building, which revealed authentic features (wood and marble floors that had been carpeted), and conserved historical architectural motifs, such as the illusionist murals that line the main corridor.

The Contemporary Art collection, housed in the galleries created out of the estate's original garage and stables, is small but of high quality, including paintings by Larry Rivers, Andy Warhol, Robert Ryman, Red Grooms, and Marylyn Dintenfass. Additionally, seven small galleries were created in the old horse stable stalls to enable Cheekwood to display installation art.

The Ann & Monroe Carell Jr. Family Sculpture Trail, a collection of ten sculptures by international artists, extends the contemporary art collection into nature, focusing on a kind of intimate, outdoor art not commonly found in American museums.

== Botanical garden ==
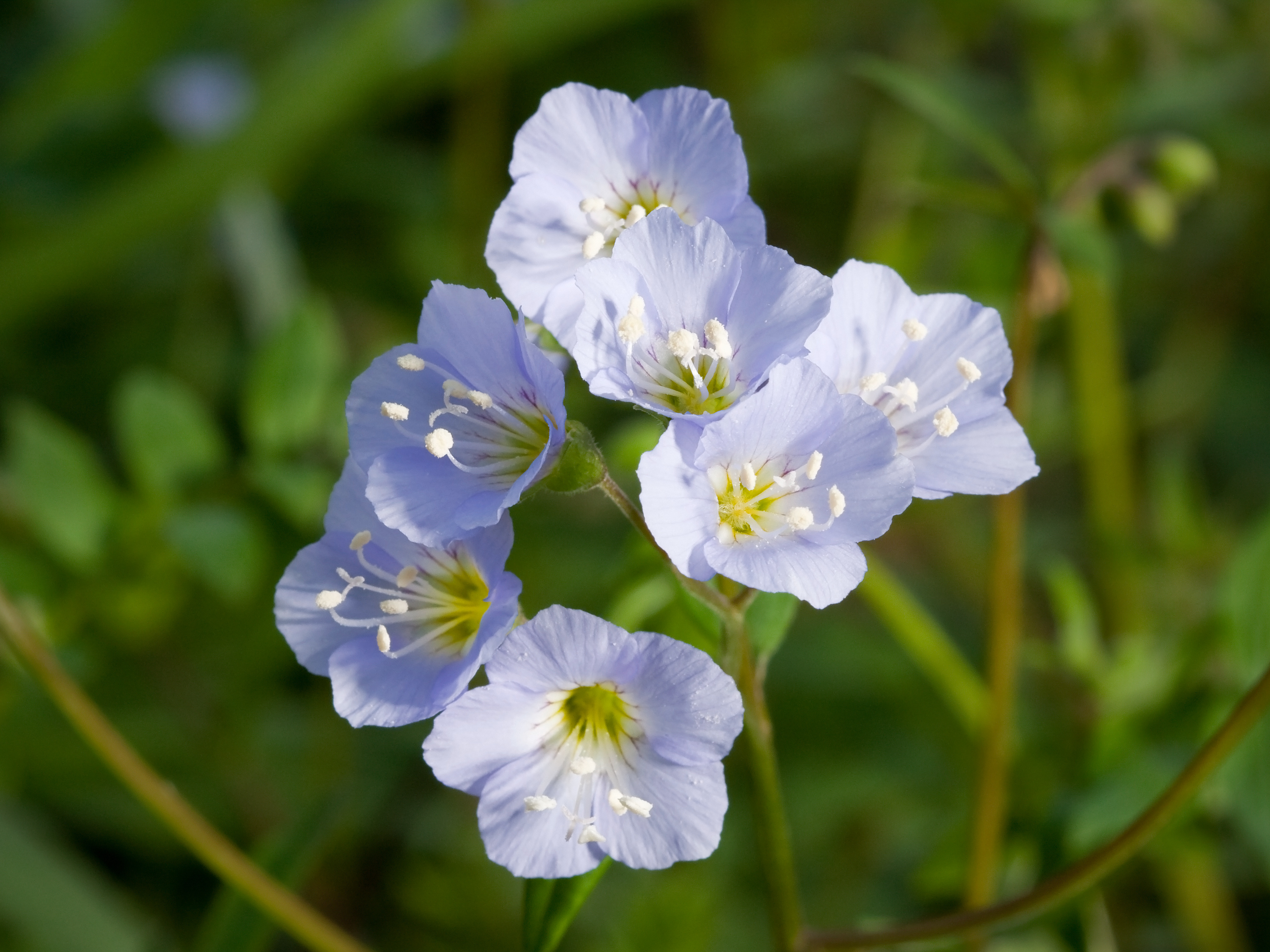
Creeping Jacob's Ladder (Polemonium reptans) at Cheekwood Botanical Garden

Extending across the grounds from the Museum of Art, the Botanical Garden encompasses the entire 55-acre (22 ha) site with an emphasis on display, education, and study. The plant collections include boxwood, conifer, crape myrtle, daffodil, daylily, dogwood, fern, herb, holly, hosta, hydrangea, Japanese maple, magnolia, Southeastern US natives, redbud, and trillium.

== Other attractions ==
In addition to the Museum and the Botanical Garden, Cheekwood operates two gift shops, and a restaurant called the Cafe 1929 which is located in the Frist Learning Center.

== Swan Ball controversy ==
In 1963, Jane Andreson Dudley, wife of former United States Ambassador to Denmark Guilford Dudley established The Swan Ball as a means of raising funds for the new Tennessee Botanical Gardens and Fine Arts Center at Cheekwood. In July 2024, Cheekwood was sued by the SB Initiative, Inc., a group of former Swan Ball committee members, who claimed that Cheekwood took over the Swan Ball's donor database, bank account, and bookkeeping, and was attempting to assert control over the event. The lawsuit also claimed that Cheekwood orchestrated a "coup" to take over the event.

Cheekwood filed a counterclaim against the Swan Ball Initiative in July 2024, arguing that Cheekwood was the rightful owner of the Swan Ball trademark and that the event was inseparable from Cheekwood.

In September 2024, the Swan Ball organizers moved the 2025 event to Edwin Warner Park, and announced that the Park would be the new beneficiary. The lawsuit was resolved with both parties agreeing that the Swan Ball Committee, formally incorporated as SB Initiative, Inc., owned the trademark Swan Ball.

== See also ==
- List of botanical gardens and arboretums in the United States
