= Danielle McDaniel =

Danielle McDaniel (born May 18, 1962) is an American visual arts educator, ceramic artist, sculptor, author, and entrepreneur who specializes in teaching pottery techniques and workshops. Known as The Clay Lady since 1982, McDaniel developed The Clay Lady Way teaching method for art educators. The effective process streamlines clay firing into one step instead of two, which helps educators cut costs and time when creating pottery. The Clay Lady Way is further explained in McDaniel's manual for teachers, How to Teach Clay The Clay Lady Way, self-published in 1996. The manual offers instructions and suggestions for applying a series of pottery lessons appropriate for a variety of educational settings while working on a budget.

== Biography ==
McDaniel was born in Tulsa, Oklahoma and moved to Hendersonville, Tennessee in 1973. After graduating from high school, McDaniel attended Volunteer State Community College in Nashville, Tennessee (1980); Western Kentucky University in Bowling Green, Kentucky; and Middle Tennessee State University in Murfreesboro, Tennessee (1982). In 1982 McDaniel began studying pottery with Lena Lucas at Metro Parks Centennial Art Center in Nashville, Tennessee.

McDaniel built a small classroom next to her home in Hendersonville, Tennessee and began offering clay classes to local children. It was during this time that her students named her The Clay Lady. McDaniel continued teaching classes for Metro Parks and offered workshops and classes at Cheekwood Botanical Garden and Museum of Art and the Jewish Community Center in Nashville.

By 1995 McDaniel was also teaching workshops and classes for the Hendersonville Arts Council as well as providing classes at local festivals and community events in the Nashville area. She then began working with local public and private schools in teaching weekly onsite workshops and clay classes featuring The Clay Lady Way. Eventually, McDaniel was working with over 800 students each week and traveling to numerous schools across middle Tennessee. She published a textbook, The Clay Lady Way: A Textbook for Teaching Clay Grades K-12. Other publications include Made the Clay Lady Way, a collection of lessons for teachers; The Spirit of the Lesson, and Forted, a novel for young adults.

A series of Clay Lady DVDs was developed and included titles such as How to Throw on the Potter’s Wheel and How to Teach Clay the Clay Lady Way. These are now part of The Clay Lady's YouTube Channel.

In 2007, McDaniel and her business associate, Tami Archer, purchased Mid-South Ceramic Supply and merged The Clay Lady’s products and educational services into one facility on Lebanon Pike in Nashville. This merger lead to the establishment of The Clay Lady’s Artist Co-op and Galleries. A purchase of an additional building in 2011 allowed for educational outreach expansion and studio space for artists.

The Clay Lady’s Campus now serves almost 200 students each week who visit for tours, pottery classes and workshops on a variety of topics that include on-going pottery classes, sculpture classes, glass, metal, and wood. The campus is also home to over 65 Co-op artists and provides meeting space for conferences and events such as the International Ceramic Arts Network Conferences (formerly The Potter’s Council), and ARTable, an event that merges artists with art enthusiasts, and workshops sponsored by Tennessee Craft. In addition, McDaniel continues to offer workshops and related art opportunities for young people with disabilities as part of Borderless Arts Tennessee (formerly VSA TN).

McDaniel was awarded the 2020 Friend of Tennessee Art Educators by the Tennessee Art Educators Association for her work in art education as well as for her ongoing support for art educators across Tennessee. She stays active in community and leadership organizations and maintains membership in Metro Arts Commission (Nashville) and Tennessee Craft. McDaniel regularly presents at the National Council on Education in the Arts Conferences (NCECA) and serves as a consultant to SKUTT Industries and Shimpo, Inc.

Danielle was co-presenter and co-author on a qualitative research study that examined works of social consciousness, art education, traditional and non-traditional art venues. The results of the case study were presented as a virtual workshop at the International Conference of Arts in Society (June 2020). The formal research paper extended paper with findings was presented at the Eastern Educational Research Association Annual Conference in February, 2021. The collaborative paper was published in the 2021 EERA Annual Conference Proceedings. Danielle's newest book, The Clay Lady's Lesson Book: Practical Lessons for the Studio and the Spirit of the Potter ' was published in 2021. This comprehensive title explores the processes involved in creating, connecting, and encouraging the artist's spirit in all of us!

== Works ==
- McDaniel, Danielle. (2021). The Clay Lady's Lesson Book: Practical Lessons for the Studio and the Spirit of the Potter. Nashville TN: The Clay Lady's Publishing House.
- McDaniel, Danielle. (2006). Made the Clay Lady Way Series. Nashville TN: The Clay Lady’s Publishing House.
- McDaniel, Danielle. (2006). The Clay Lady Way: A Textbook for Teaching Clay Grades K-12 (2nd ed.). Nashville TN: The Clay Lady’s Publishing House.
- McDaniel, Danielle (2004). Teaching Clay The Clay Lady Way (2nd ed.). Nashville TN: The Clay Lady’s Publishing House.
- "Nashville's Frist Center Presents "Women, Art, and Social Change: The Newcomb Pottery Enterprise" - Frist Art Museum". Retrieved 24 March 2019.

== Research Presentations & Awards ==
- Eastern Educational Research Association Virtual Conference February 2021, Paper Presentation: Art and Social Consciousness: One Artist's Journey and the Influence of Art Education in Traditional and Non-Traditional Settings.
- International Conference on Arts in Society, Galway, Ireland, June 2020. Workshop Presentation: Art and Social Consciousness.
- 2020 Friend of Tennessee Art Educators Association Award
