= Kent–Valentine House =

Historic house in Virginia, United States

- U.S. National Register of Historic Places
- Virginia Landmarks Register
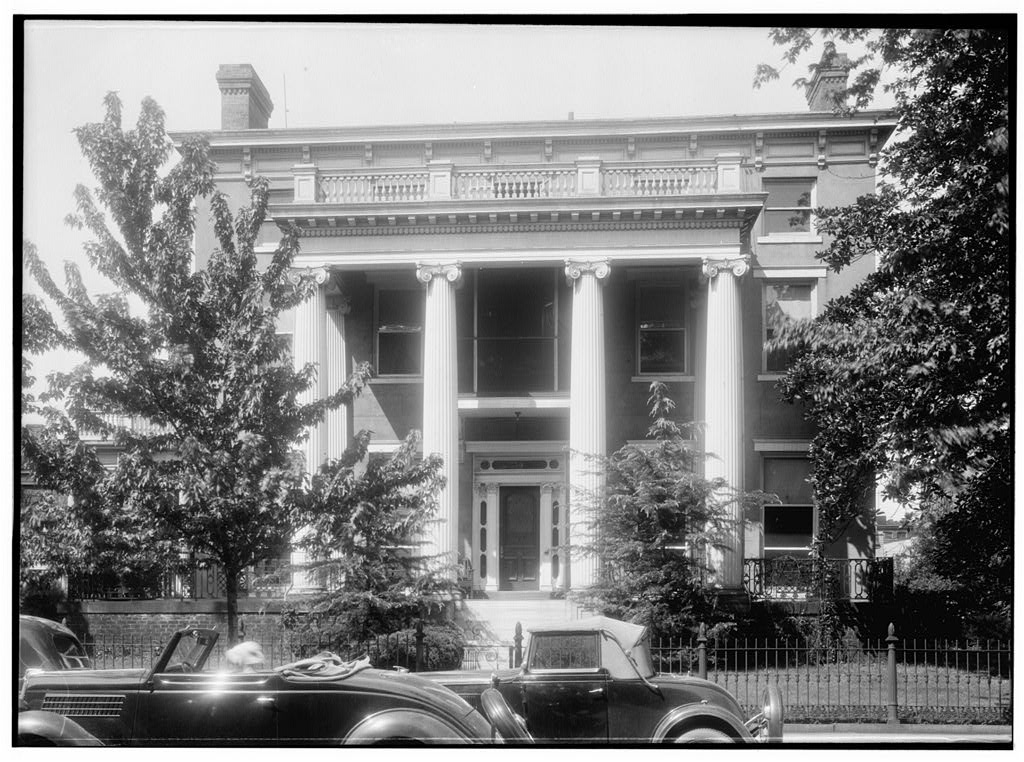

- Location within Virginia Location within the United States
- Location: 12 E. Franklin St., Richmond, Virginia
- Coordinates: 37°32′38″N 77°26′34″W
- Area: 2 acres (0.81 ha)
- Built: 1845, 1904
- Architect: Rogers, Isaiah
- Architectural style: Colonial Revival
- NRHP reference No.: 70000882
- VLR No.: 127-0112

Significant dates
- Added to NRHP: December 18, 1970
- Designated VLR: October 6, 1970

The Kent–Valentine House is a historic home in Richmond, Virginia. It was built in 1845 from plans by Isaiah Rogers of Boston. It is a three-story, five-bay, stuccoed brick mansion with a two-story wing at the rear of the west side. It features a two-story, three-bay portico with Roman Ionic columns and balustrade. In 1904, the house was enlarged to its present five bay width and the interior redesigned in the Colonial Revival style.

It was listed on the National Register of Historic Places in 1970.

The house is the headquarters of the Historic Garden Week project of the Garden Club of Virginia, which is the nation's only statewide house and garden tour that runs for a week each April across the state of Virginia. In its 84th year, the tour is of Virginia's most historic houses, as well as a sampling of other notable private residences. It is run from offices at the Kent–Valentine House on Franklin Street in downtown Richmond, Virginia.
