= Isaiah Rogers =

American architect (1800–1869)

- Born: August 17, 1800; Marshfield, Massachusetts, U.S.
- Died: April 13, 1869 (aged 68)
- Occupation: Architect
- Practice: Rogers, Whitestone & Co.
- Buildings: Ohio Statehouse; New York Merchants Exchange; Astor House; Boston Merchants Exchange; Captain Robert Bennet Forbes House; Kent–Valentine House; Howard Athenaeum; Hillforest; Cathedral of the Assumption; Maxwell House Hotel

Isaiah Rogers (August 17, 1800 – April 13, 1869) was an American architect from Massachusetts who eventually moved his practice south, where he was based in Louisville, Kentucky, and Cincinnati, Ohio. He completed numerous designs for hotels, courthouses and other major buildings in Boston, Massachusetts, and New York City, before that relocation.

He was appointed in 1863 as the Supervising Architect of the United States, serving into 1865; the position was then attached to the Department of the Treasury. He also practiced in Mobile, Alabama after the American Civil War.

== Background ==
Rogers was born in Marshfield, Massachusetts to Isaac Rogers, a farmer and shipwright, and his wife Hannah Ford. In 1823 he married Emily Wesley Tobey of Portland, Maine. The couple had eight children, four of whom survived infancy. Two of his sons followed him into the profession of architecture.

Rogers was a student of Solomon Willard. He became one of the country's foremost hotel architects and was renowned for Boston's Tremont House (the first hotel with indoor plumbing), the Astor House in New York City, and the Exchange Hotel in Richmond, Virginia. He designed the Burnett House in Cincinnati, then the largest and most elegant hotel in the Midwest. He also designed New York's Astor Opera House (1847).

With William Keeley, Rogers designed The Cathedral of the Assumption, Louisville, Kentucky in the Neo-Gothic style. Upon its completion in 1852, the 287-foot spire was North America's tallest.

His design for the fourth Hamilton County, Ohio Hamilton County Courthouse was for a massive three-story building, measuring 190 feet square. The building closely resembles Rogers' Merchants Exchange building, Wall Street in New York City. He also designed the Boston Merchants Exchange.

Rogers was the supervising architect, the last of five, who worked on the Ohio Statehouse. He completed the building in 1861.

In 1853, Rogers founded an architecture firm in Louisville, Kentucky with another architect named Henry Whitestone. That firm was originally named Rogers, Whitestone & Co., Architects. It is still practicing today under the name of Luckett & Farley Architects, Engineers, & Interior Designers.

From 1863 to 1865, due to his friendship with fellow Cincinnatian Salmon P. Chase, Secretary of the Treasury, Rogers was appointed as Supervising Architect of the United States. In this role, he designed and patented four burglar-proof vaults built in the northwest corner of the U.S. Treasury Building in 1864. Their lining consisted of two layers of cast iron balls interposed between the traditional alternating plates of wrought iron and hardened steel. The balls, held loosely in specially formed cavities, were designed to rotate freely upon contact with a drill, or any other tool, thereby preventing a burglar from penetrating. The design was first used for two vaults built in the New York Sub-Treasury in 1862 (this building is now use as Federal Hall National Memorial). Similar vaults were built in custom houses in Detroit, Cincinnati, and Chicago.

== Selected architectural works ==
Tremont House, Boston, Massachusetts

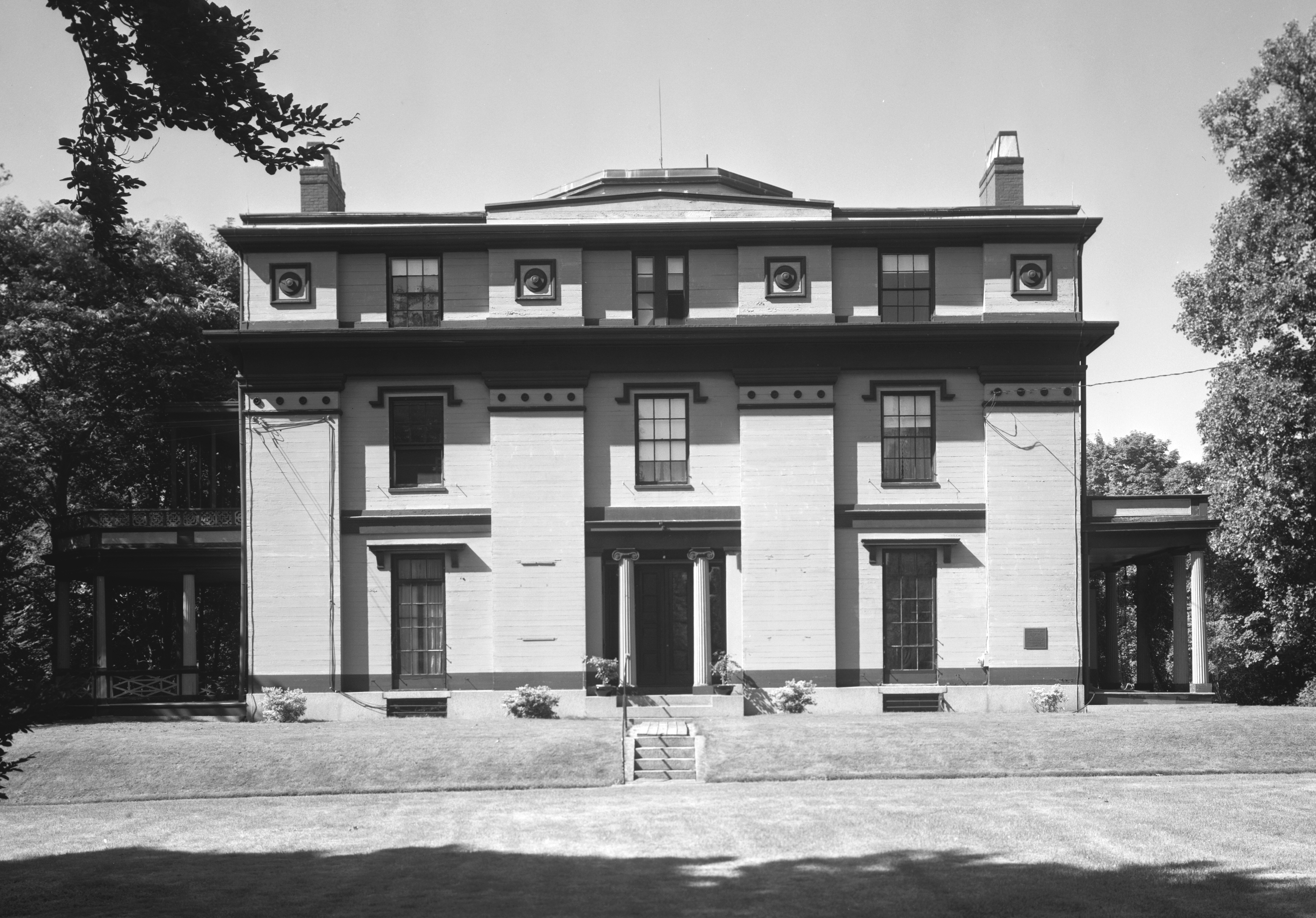
The Captain Robert Bennet Forbes House

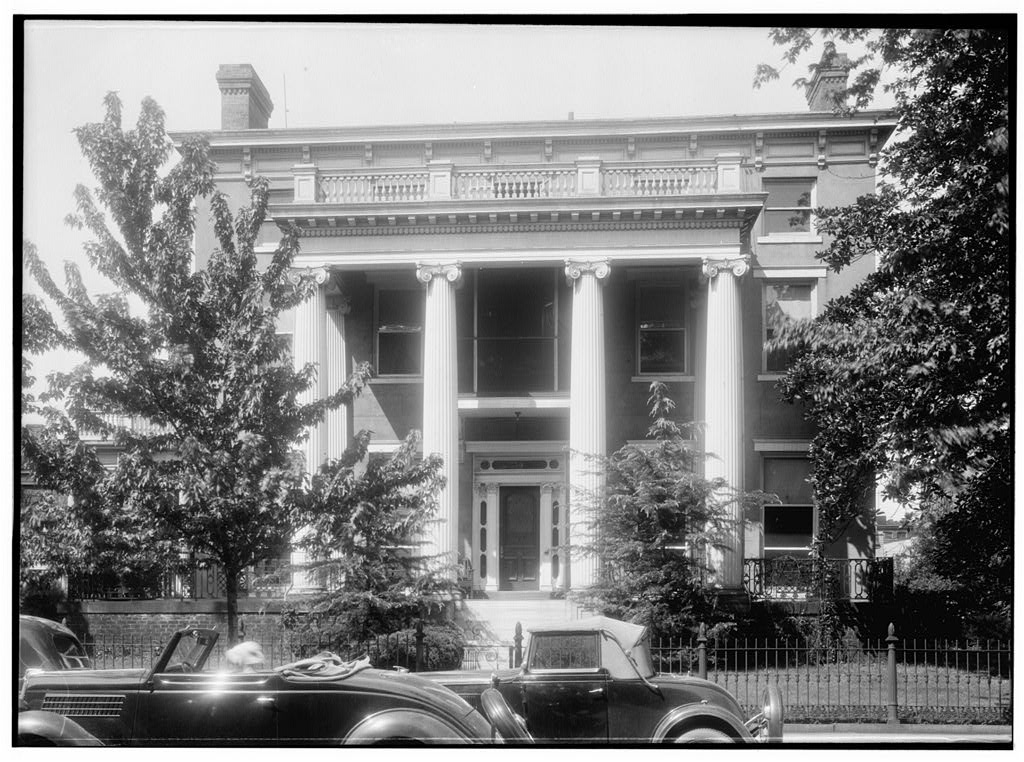
Kent-Valentine House, Richmond, Virginia

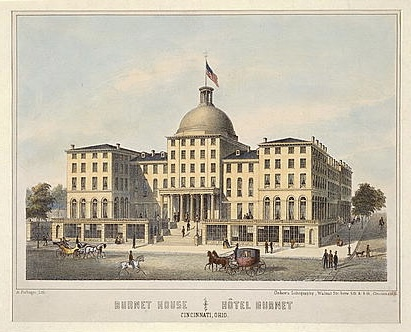
Burnet House in Cincinnati, pictured 1850s

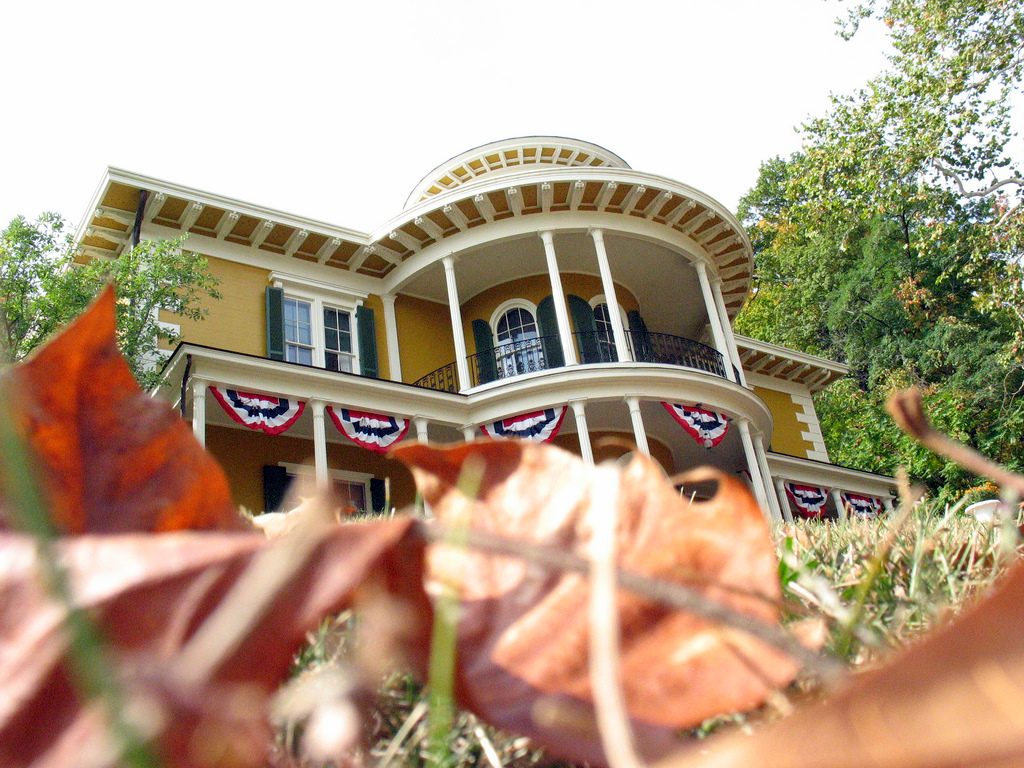
Hillforest (Thomas Gaff House)

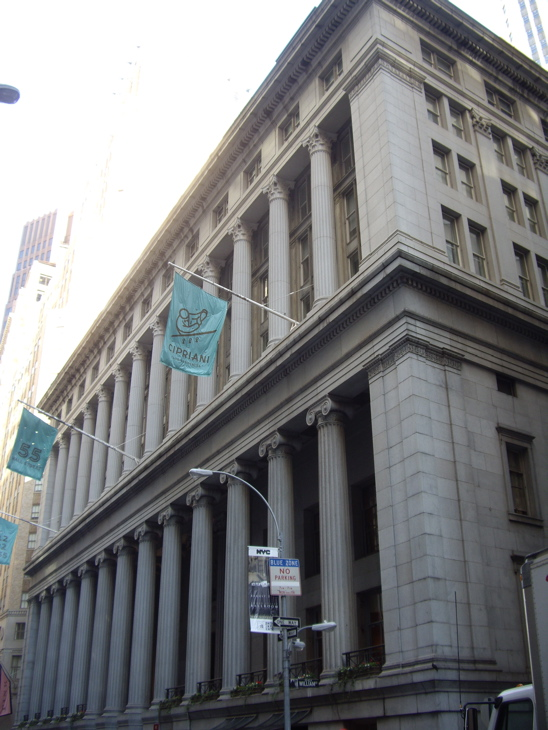
Merchants Exchange building, Wall Street (National City Bank Building)

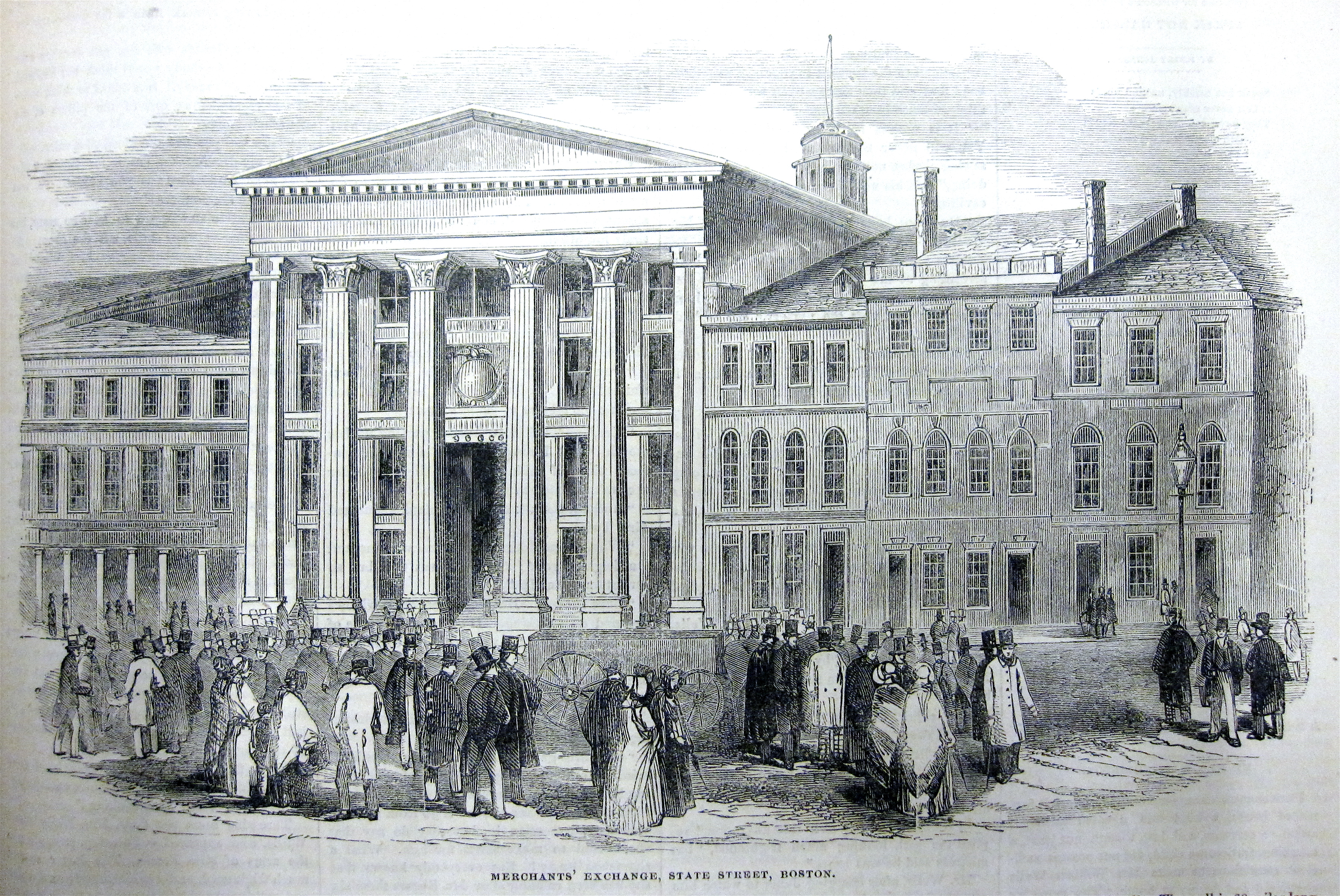
Merchants Exchange (Boston) (1852)

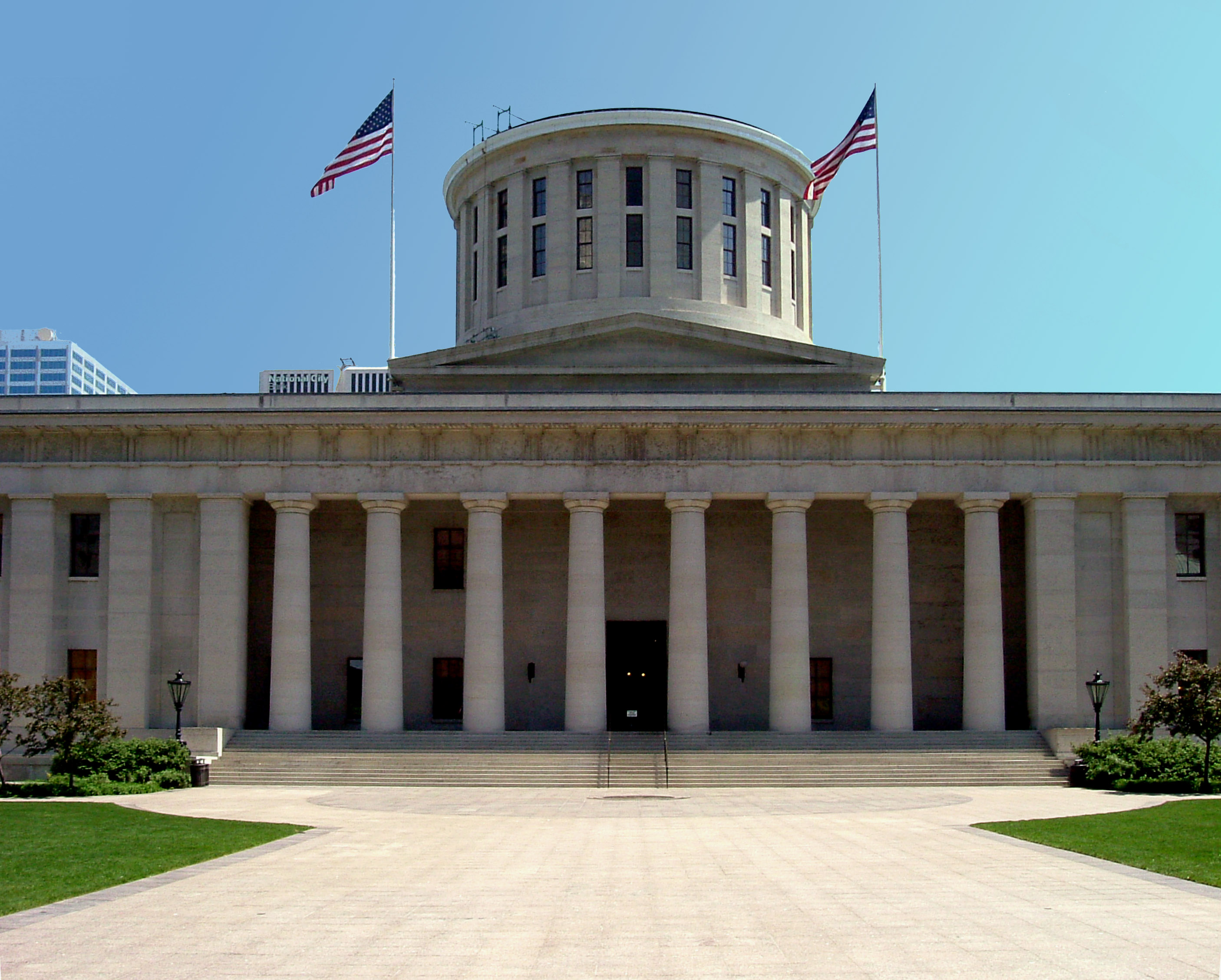
Ohio Statehouse
- 1827 Tremont Theatre (Boston), later rebuilt as Tremont Temple (1896)
- 1829 Tremont House, Boston
- 1830 Old State House, Boston, redesign (with William Washburn) in the Classical Revival style to serve as a City Hall until 1841
- 1832–33 Commercial Wharf, Boston
- 1833 Captain Robert Bennet Forbes House, Milton, Massachusetts
- 1833 Bangor House, Bangor, Maine
- 1836 John Jacob Astor House, a hotel on the site of Astor's home in New York City that lasted 80 years. In 1913 city officials announced that "the southern half of the hotel was to be torn down to accommodate construction of the Brooklyn Rapid Transit Company subway (now the N and R lines). Two years later, 217 Broadway was built." It was first called the Astor House Building and then the Astor Building.
- 1836 Merchants Exchange building, Wall Street
- 1840 Egyptian revival gate for Old Granary Burying Ground in Boston
- 1841 Merchants Exchange (Boston)
- 1842 New York Merchants Exchange, later the New York Customs House, New York City
- 1843 Egyptian Revival gate and fence for Touro Cemetery in Newport, Rhode Island
- 1845 Kent-Valentine House, Richmond, Virginia
- 1846 Howard Athenaeum, Boston
- 1849−1850 Burnet House Cincinnati
- 1850s Thomas Gaff House, Aurora, Indiana
- 1852 Cathedral of the Assumption in Louisville, Kentucky was designed by William Keeley and Rogers
- 1852−1853 Battle House, Mobile, Alabama
- 1859 Oliver House, Toledo, Ohio
- 1862−1865 Maxwell House Hotel, Nashville, Tennessee (destroyed by fire, Christmas 1861)
- 1865 Galt House, Louisville, Kentucky

== See also ==
- Richard Bond (architect)

== Bibliography ==
- Berger, Molly W. (2011). Hotel Dreams: Luxury, Technology, and Urban Ambition in America, 1829−1929. Baltimore: Johns Hopkins University Press. ISBN 978-0-8018-9987-4.
- Williamson, Jefferson (1930). The American Hotel: An Anecdotal History. New York: Alfred A. Knopf.

Preceded by Ammi B. Young	Office of the Supervising Architect; 1863–1865	Succeeded by Alfred B. Mullett
