= Merchants Exchange (Boston) =

Coordinates: 42°21′31.33″N 71°3′22.56″W

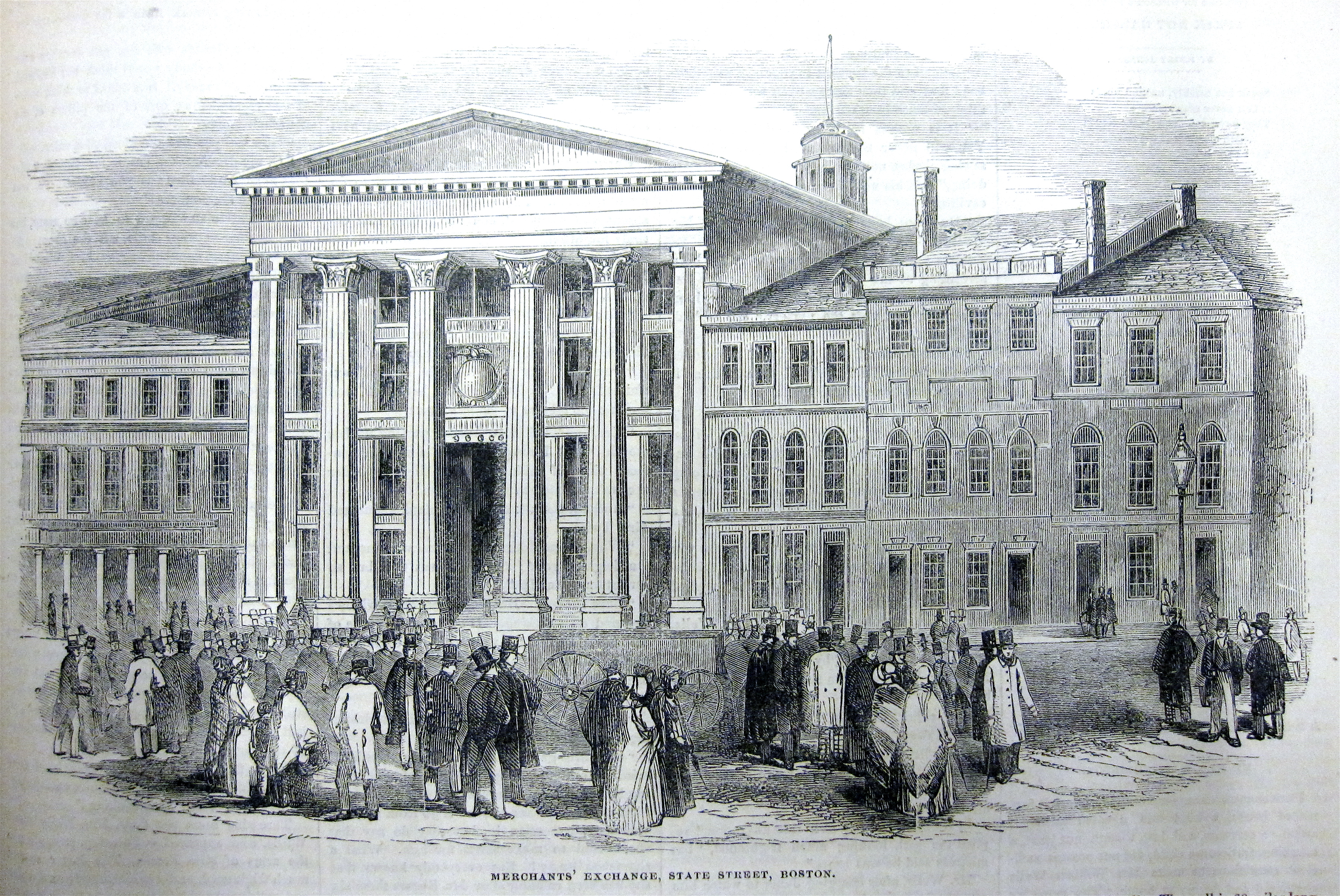
Merchant's Exchange, Boston, 1852

The Merchants Exchange building in Boston, Massachusetts, was built in 1841 to a design by architect Isaiah Rogers. Centrally located on State Street, it functioned as a hub for business activities in the city.

== History ==
The Merchants Exchange served as one of Boston's "great gathering-points of the traders -- the marble-paved and frescoed hall ... with its newspaper files, bulletins, wind vane, and ship registry." It was "elegant ... with a fine reading-room, ... and besides accommodations for the post office, and for several insurance and brokers' offices, affords many conveniences for the mercantile community."

=== Architecture ===
Built between 1841 and 1842 by architect Isaiah Rogers, Merchants Exchange was considered "among the best specimens of architecture in Boston" and "a dignified building in its day." Re-modelling occurred after the building "went down" in the fire of 1872.

After 1890, the "Exchange Building" occupied the site of the former Merchants Exchange building.

=== Function ===
The building housed business activities, such as:

- Board of Trade (est. 1854)
- Boston Board of Marine Underwriters (est. 1850)
- Boston Marine Society
- Boston Stock Exchange (1844–1853)
- Commercial Exchange (est. 1871)
- Post Office (ca.1860–1872)
- Soldiers' Messenger Corps

== Images ==
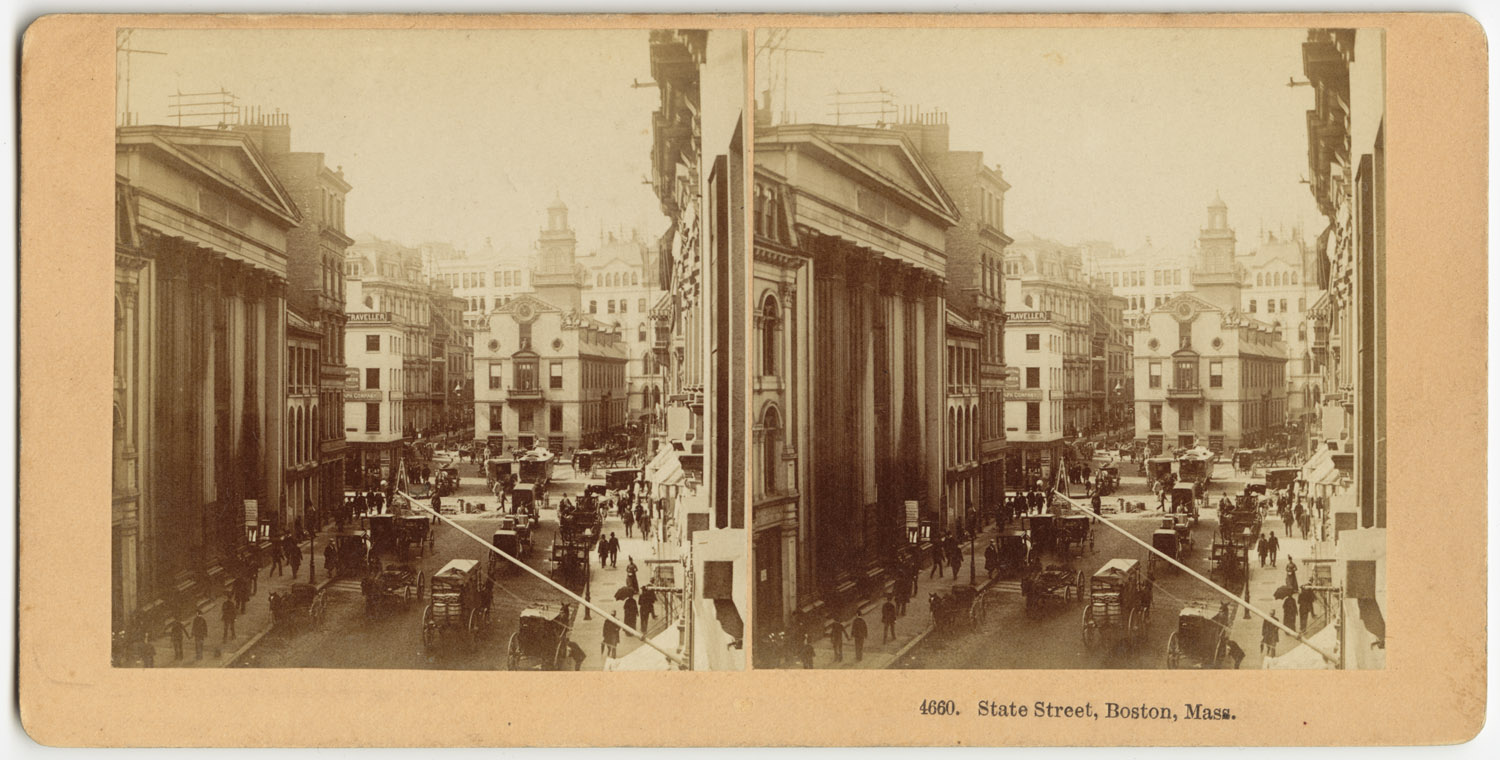
State Street

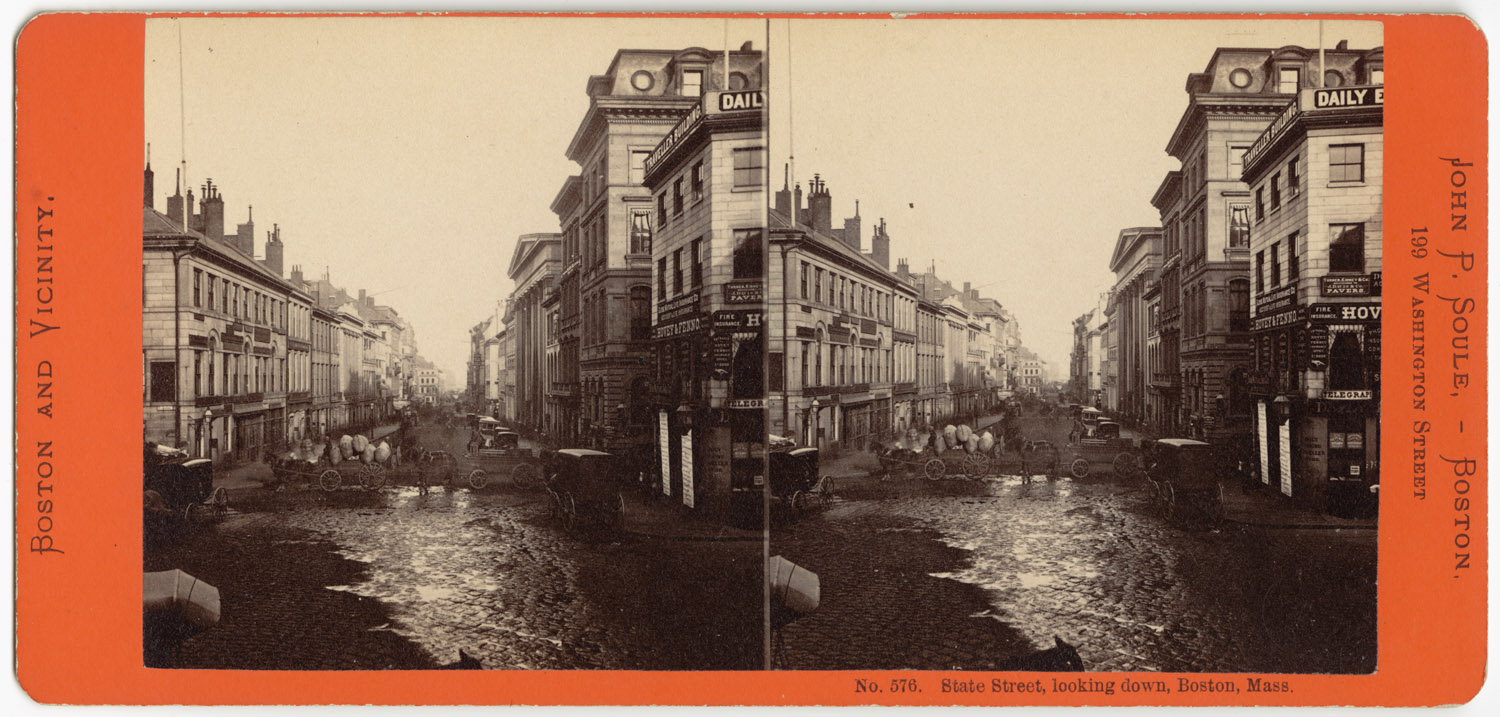
State Street

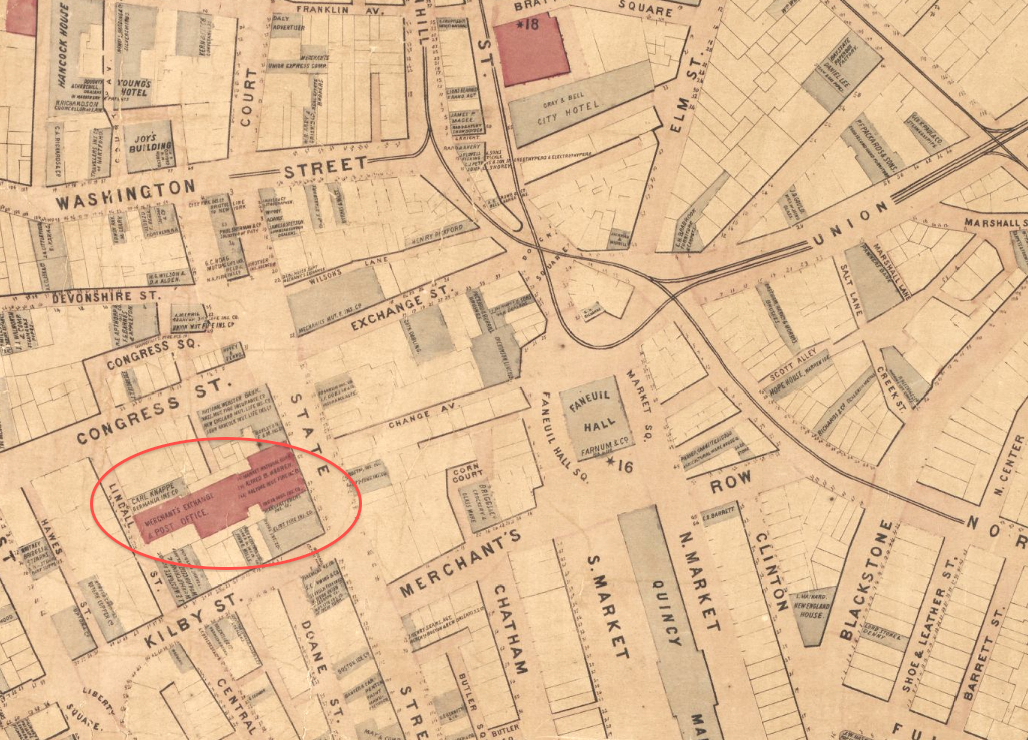
Detail of 1860s map of Boston, showing Merchants Exchange building

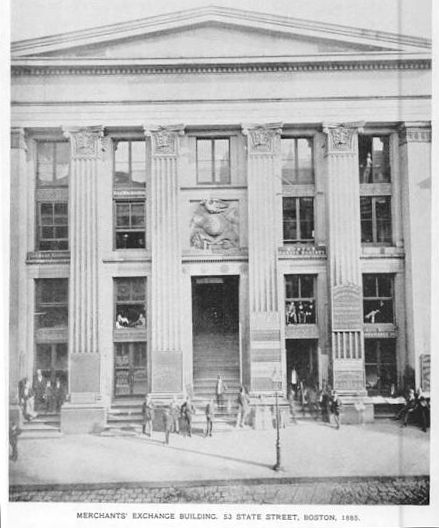
The Exchange, ca.1885

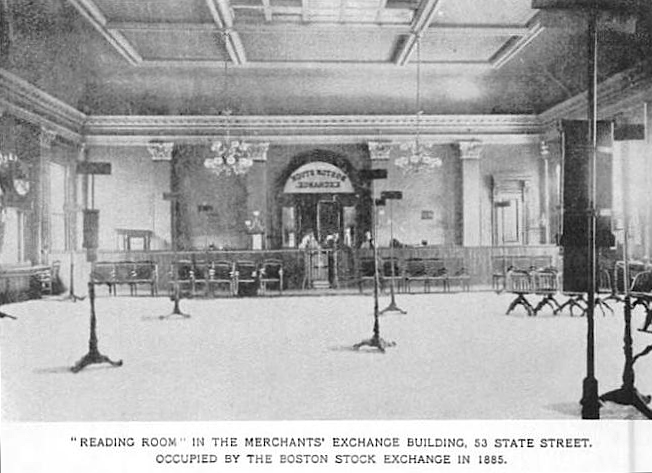
Reading room, ca.1885
