= ServiceSource Tower (Nashville) =

Building in Nashville, Tennessee, US

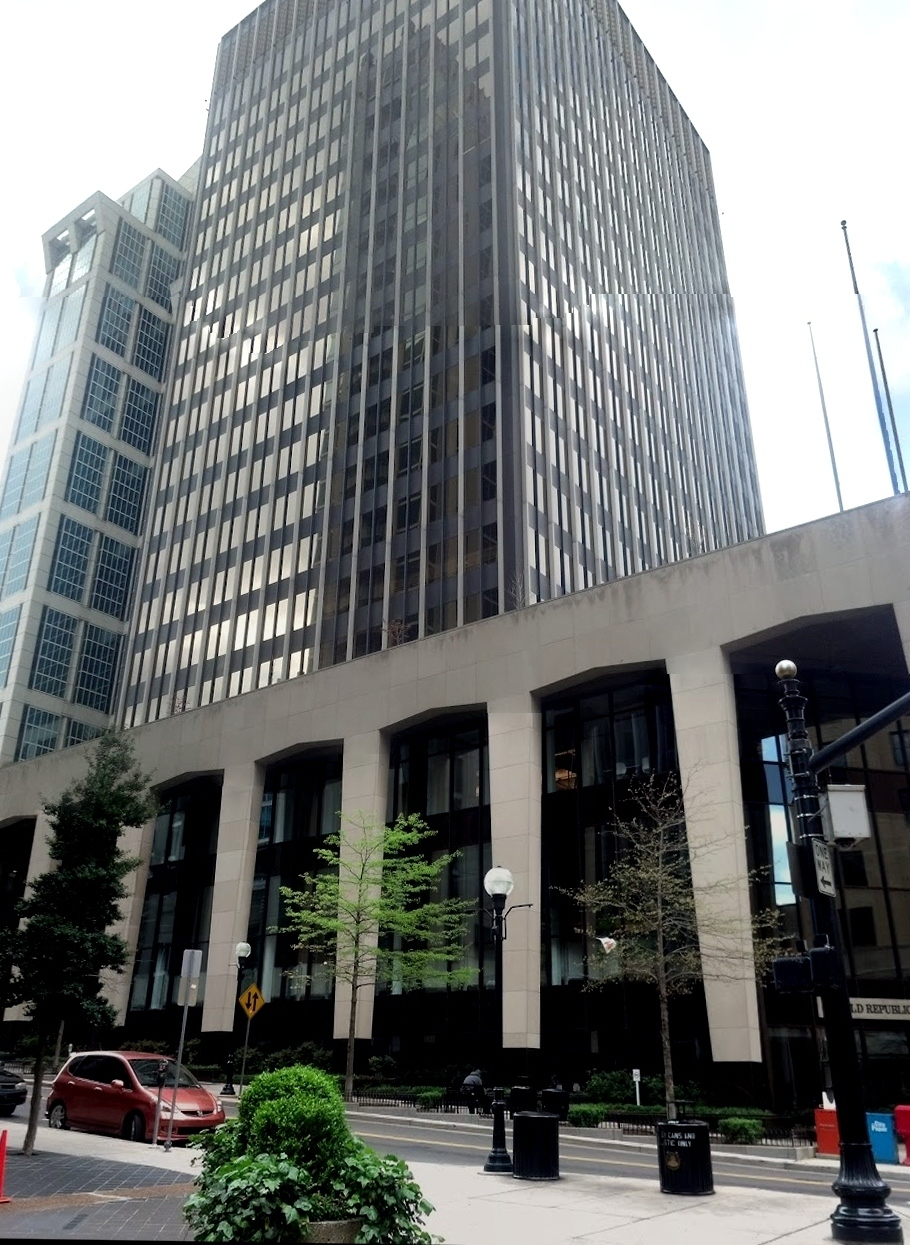
- Interactive map of the ServiceSource Tower area

General information
- Status: Completed
- Type: Office
- Location: 201 4th Avenue North; Nashville, Tennessee; United States
- Coordinates: 36°9′49.76″N 86°46′46.10″W
- Opening: 1968
- Owner: Sterling American Property, Inc

Height
- Roof: 292 ft (89 m)

Technical details
- Floor count: 20
- Floor area: 250,566 sq ft

Design and construction
- Architects: Brush, Hutchison, & Gwinn

ServiceSource Tower, also previously known as the SunTrust Building and the 4th and Church Building, is a high-rise office building in downtown Nashville, Tennessee. ServiceSource Tower is the 20th tallest building in Nashville, with 20 stories and a height of 292 ft (89 m).

== History ==
This building was built as the headquarters for Third National Corporation in 1968, and was designed by Brush, Hutchison, & Gwinn. It was previously known as the Third National Bank Building, prior to the SunTrust acquisition of Third National Corporation, and eventual name change in 1995.

When it opened in 1967, ServiceSource Tower was the city’s second tallest building, trailing only the 409-foot, 30-story L&C Tower.

The site at 4th & Church was also home to the historic Maxwell House Hotel from 1859 until it burned and was destroyed by fire on Christmas Day in 1961.

The building was updated with ServiceSource signage in July 2012.

== Tenants ==
The original tenant was Third National Corporation of Nashville, which became a subsidiary of SunTrust, who vacated the building to move to SunTrust Plaza.

Another intriguing previous tenant was the Signature Tower sales center and Giarratana Development offices.

J.P. Morgan Chase has also filed for a permit to open a branch here.

A popular current tenant is the Nashville City Club located on the 20th floor.

== See also ==
- List of tallest buildings in Nashville
