= Maxwell House =

American coffee brand

- Product type: Coffee
- Current owner: Kraft Heinz (North America); JDE Peet's (Rest of the world)
- Country: United States
- Introduced: 1892; 134 years ago by Joel Owsley Cheek
- Related brands: Gevalia
- Previous owners: Nashville Coffee (Note: Complete name " Coffee and Manufacturing Company"); General Foods; Kraft Foods Inc.
- Tagline: Good to the last drop

Maxwell House is an American brand of coffee manufactured by a like-named division of Kraft Heinz in North America and JDE Peet's in the rest of the world. Introduced in 1892 by wholesale grocer Joel Owsley Cheek, it was named in honor of the Maxwell House Hotel in Nashville, Tennessee, which was its first major customer. For nearly 100 years, until the late 1980s, it was the top-selling coffee brand in the United States. The company's slogan is "Good to the last drop," which is often incorporated into its logo and is printed on its labels.

Maxwell House coffee has been owned and produced by several companies, starting with Cheek's company, Nashville Coffee and Manufacturing Company, then followed by General Foods and Kraft Foods Inc.

== History ==
=== Early origins ===
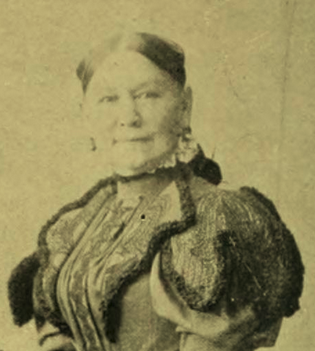
The hotel was named after Harriet Maxwell Overton (1911 photo)

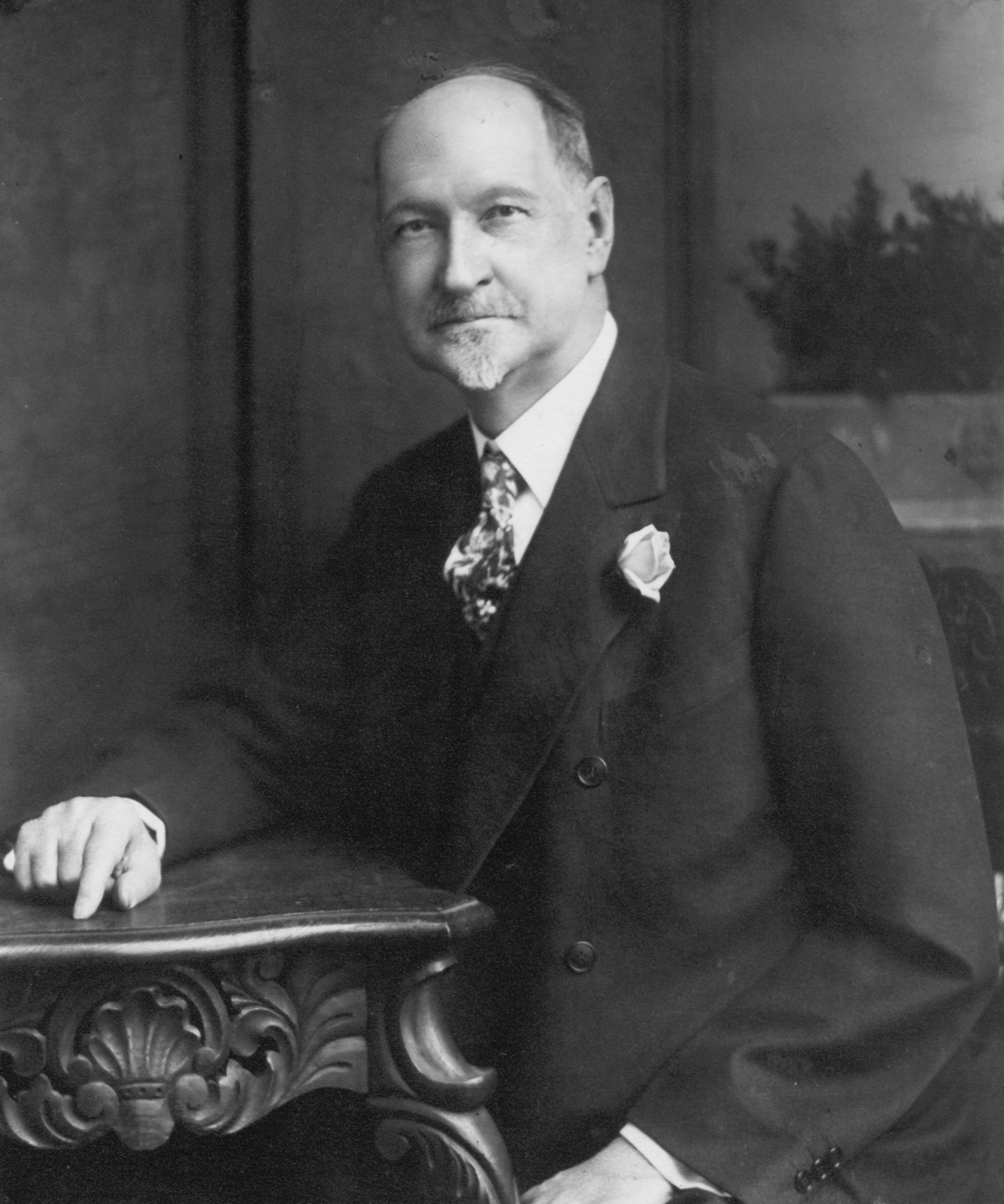
Joel Cheek, founder of the company and the Maxwell House brand

In 1884, Joel Cheek moved to Nashville and met Roger Nolley Smith, a British coffee broker. He was said to be able to tell the origin of a coffee simply by smelling the green beans. Over the next few years, the two worked on finding the perfect blend. In 1892, Cheek approached the food buyer for the Maxwell House Hotel and gave him 20 pounds of his special blend for free. After a few days, the coffee was gone, and the hotel returned to using its usual brand. But after hearing complaints from patrons and others who liked Cheek's coffee better, the hotel bought Cheek's blend exclusively. After six months, the hotel agreed to allow Cheek to name his coffee after his first big sale.

Inspired by his success, Cheek resigned from his job as a coffee broker and, with partner Maxwell Colbourne, formed a wholesale grocery distributor known as the "Nashville Coffee and Manufacturing Company". They specialized in coffee, with Maxwell House Coffee, as it came to be known, as the central brand. Later, the Nashville Coffee and Manufacturing Company was renamed as the "Cheek-Neal Coffee Company". Over the next several years, the Maxwell House Coffee brand became a well-respected name that set it apart from the competition.

=== "Good to the last drop" ===
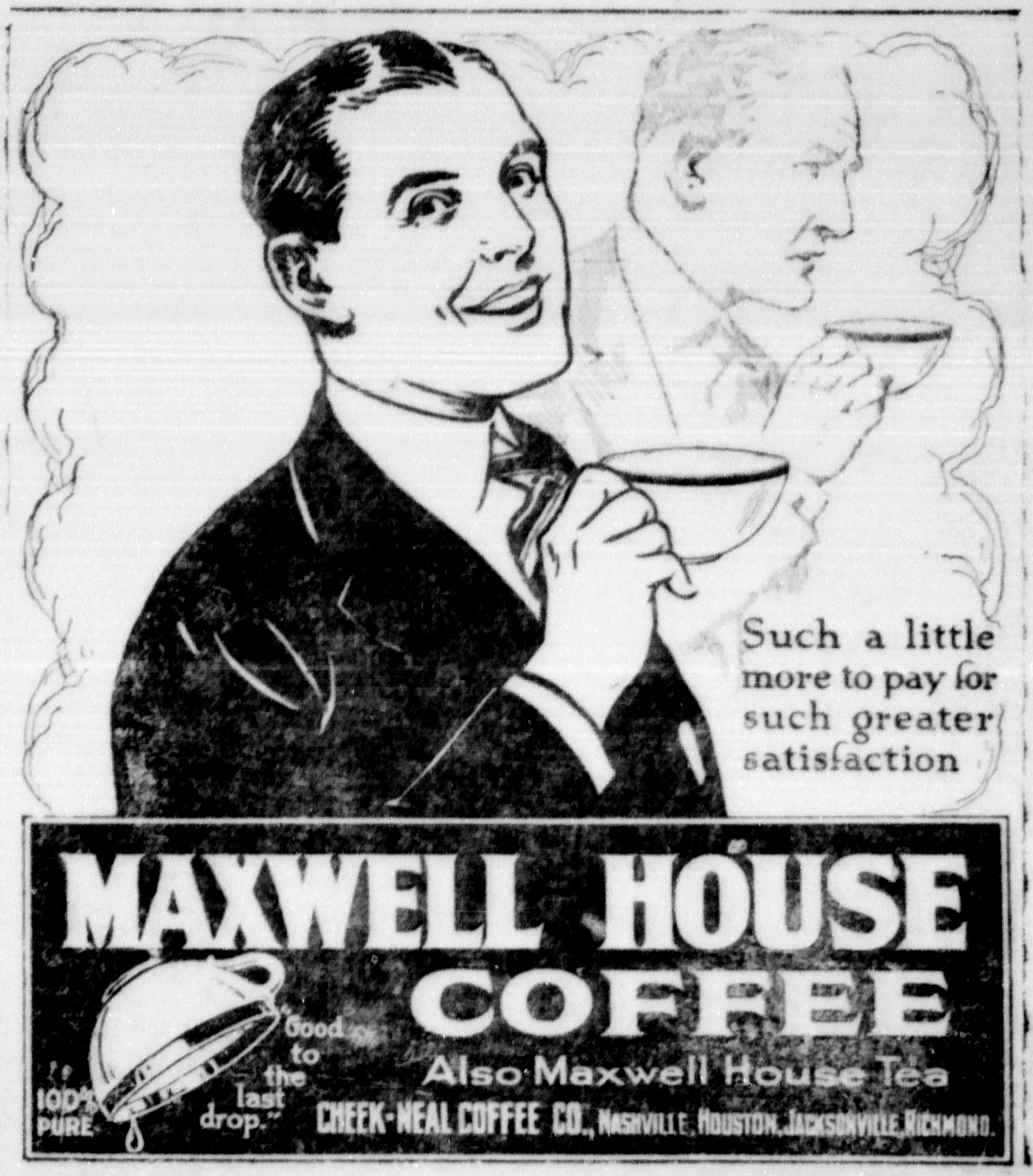
Maxwell House newspaper ad from 1921

In 1915, Cheek-Neal began using a "Good to the last drop" slogan to advertise their Maxwell House Coffee. For several years, the ads made no claim of Theodore Roosevelt being the originator of the phrase. The company was then sold to General Foods which took over the Maxwell House brand in 1925. By the 1930s, the company was running advertisements that claimed that the former president had taken a sip of Maxwell House Coffee on a visit to Andrew Jackson's estate, The Hermitage, near Nashville on October 21, 1907, and when served the coffee, he proclaimed it to be "good to the last drop". During this time, Coca-Cola also used the slogan "Good to the last drop". Later, Maxwell House distanced itself from that 1930s advertising claim, admitting that the slogan was written by Clifford Spiller, former president of General Foods Corporation, and did not come from a Roosevelt remark overheard by Cheek-Neal. The phrase remains a registered trademark of the product and appears on its logo.

The veracity of the Roosevelt connection to the phrase has never been historically established. In the local press coverage of Roosevelt's October 21 visit, a story concerning Roosevelt and the cup of coffee he drank features a quote that does not resemble the slogan. He is quoted as saying: "This is the kind of stuff I like to drink, by George, when I hunt bears." The Maxwell House Company claimed in its advertising that the Roosevelt story was true. In 2009, Maxwell House ran a commercial featuring Roosevelt repriser Joe Wiegand, who tells the "Last Drop" story.

=== Expansion of the product line ===
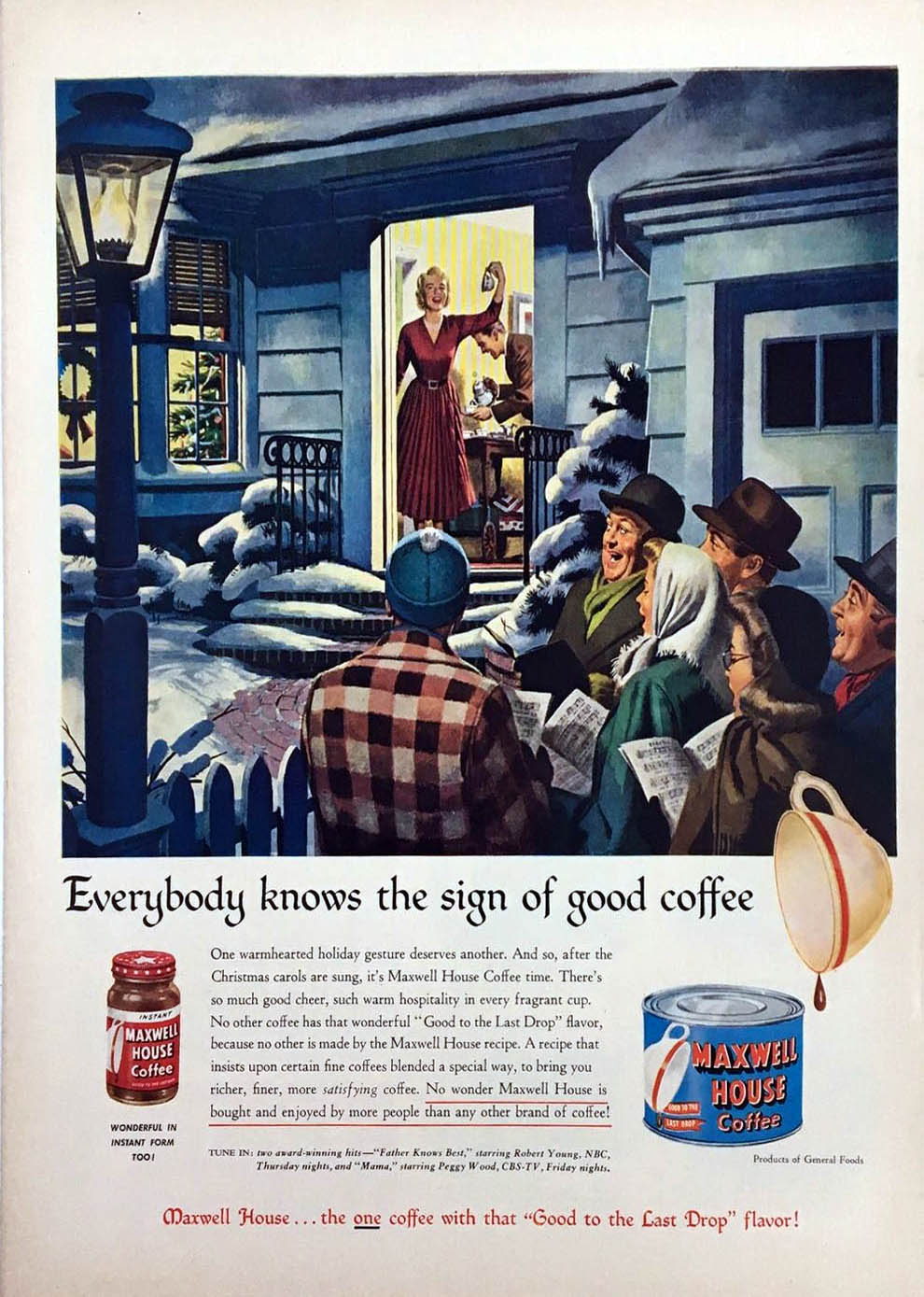
1950 advertisement of Maxwell House by General Foods

The Yuban brand (sometimes Yule brand) was John Arbuckle's name for his personal mix of fresh coffees for Christmas gifts. In 1935, Arbuckle Brothers Company, the first merchant to sell packaged coffee, was merged with Maxwell House, later, General Foods. Yuban remains available in 2026.

In 1942 during World War II, General Foods Corporation, successor to the Postum Company established by Charles William Post, contracted to supply instant coffee to the U.S. armed forces. Beginning in the fall of 1945, this product, which by that time had come to be branded as Maxwell House Instant Coffee, entered test markets in the eastern U.S.; it began national distribution the following year

From 1949 until 2015, Yuban brand coffee was made in San Leandro, California, with arabica and robusta coffee beans. In 1984, The New York Times noted it was available only on the West Coast, and was among the top three of thirteen that "were the richest and most full-bodied".

In 1966 the company introduced "Maxwell House ElectraPerk", developed specifically for electric percolators.

In 1976 General Foods added "Maxwell House A.D.C." coffee, the name reflecting its intended use in automatic drip coffeemakers such as Mr. Coffee, which were superseding traditional coffee-preparation methods. In 1972, the company had introduced "Max-Pax" ground-coffee filter rings, aimed at the then still-strong market for percolator coffee preparation. Although this method, too, has been eclipsed, the Max-Pax concept was subsequently adapted as Maxwell House Filter Packs, first marketed by this name in 1989, for use in automatic coffee makers. By the 1990s, the company had quietly discontinued formulations for specific preparation methods.

The brand is now marketed in ground and measured forms, as well as in whole-bean, flavored, and varietal blends. A higher-yield ground coffee, Maxwell House Master Blend, was introduced in 1981. Rich French Roast; Colombian Supreme, described as being 100% Colombian coffee; and 1892, described as a slow-roasted formulation, were all brought out in 1989, to compete in the increasingly competitive coffee market. In 1992, the company added cappuccino products to its line with Cappio Iced Cappuccino and Maxwell House Cappuccino in 1993. In recent years, the names of these products have been modified by the company to present a more uniform Maxwell House brand image.

After Kraft Foods Inc. was split into two companies in 2012, the rights to the Maxwell House brands were divided and are currently owned by Kraft Heinz in North America and JDE Peet's (formed from merger of Douwe Egberts and Mondelez International coffee and tea division) in the rest of the world.

=== Decaffeinated coffee ===
General Foods marketed decaffeinated coffee under various brand names such as Sanka from c. 1927, and Brim and Maxim, the latter a freeze-dried instant coffee which is not decaffeinated, from the 1950s. But it refrained from selling Maxwell House-labeled decaffeinated coffee products until 1983, when it introduced ground Maxwell House Decaffeinated into East Coast markets.

General Foods... through its Maxwell House division, entered 1984 with the West Coast introduction of Yuban ground decaffeinated coffee, followed by the national rollout of Maxwell House decaffeinated

At the same time, it introduced a decaffeinated version of its long-established, lighter-tasting Yuban brand on the West Coast. Maxwell House Instant Decaffeinated Coffee came to store shelves in 1985. A further modification of the decaf theme, Maxwell House Lite, a reduced-caffeine blend, was introduced nationally in 1992 by Kraft General Foods and in its instant form the following year.

== Advertising ==
=== 1920s advertising campaign ===
During the 1920s, the Maxwell House brand began to be extensively advertised across the US. Total advertising expenditures rose from $19,955 in 1921 to $276,894 in 1924. The brand was cited as the most well-known coffee brand in a 1925 study of consumer goods.

=== Radio ===
Maxwell House was the sponsor of Maxwell House Coffee Time, which ran from 1937 to 1949 and featured Baby Snooks (a character portrayed by Fanny Brice), Charles Ruggles, Frank Morgan, Topper, and George Burns and Gracie Allen over the years in a predominately radio comedy and variety format. Maxwell House also sponsored The Goldbergs series on radio and later on television.

=== Television ===
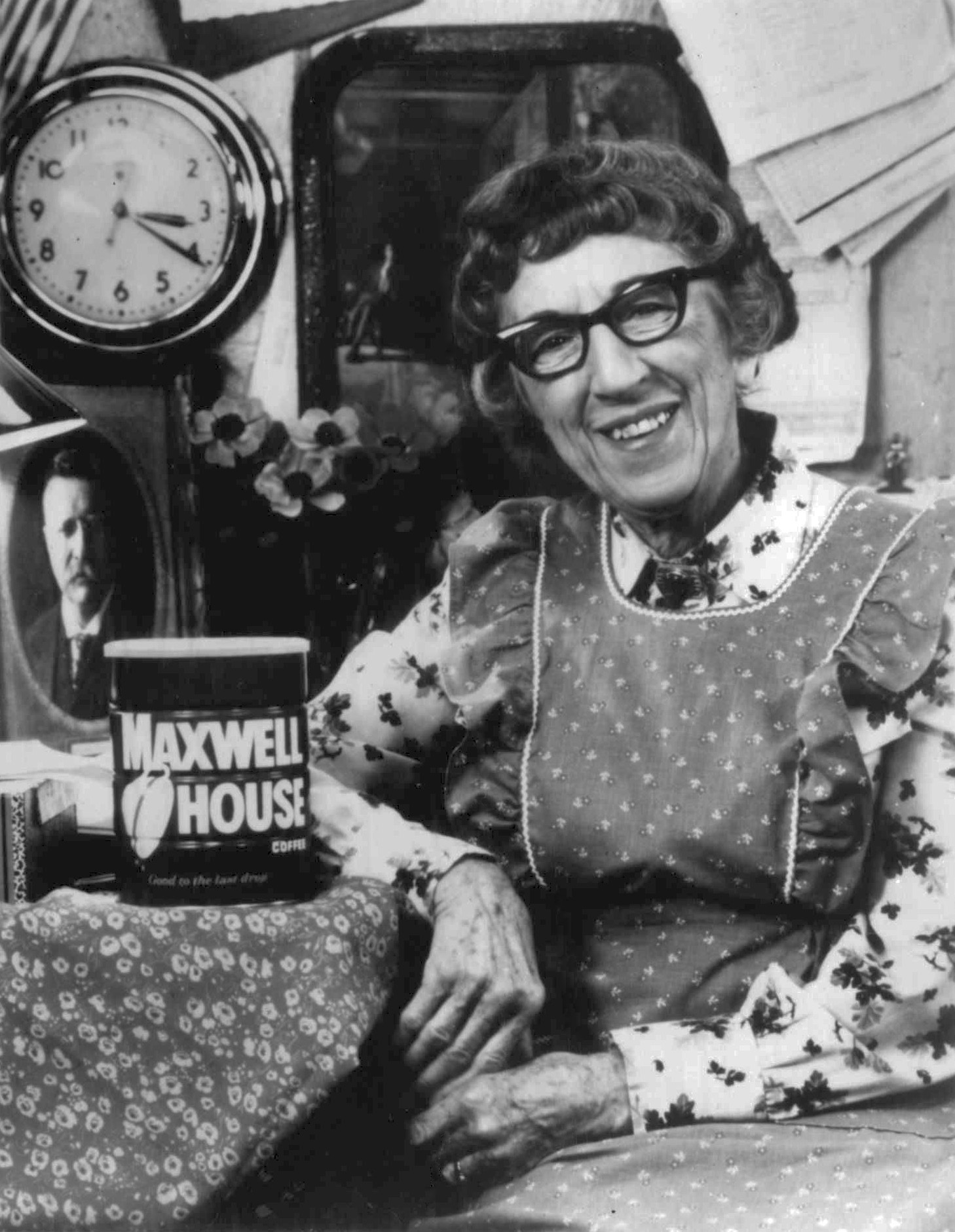
Actress Margaret Hamilton as Cora, in a 1977 Maxwell House advertisement

Maxwell House was the long-time sponsor of the early television series Mama, based on the play and film I Remember Mama. It starred Peggy Wood as the matriarch of a Norwegian-American family. It ran on the CBS network from 1949 to 1957. This was perhaps the first example of product placement on a TV show, as the family frequently gathered around the kitchen table for a cup of Maxwell House coffee, though these segments, aired toward the end of each episode, were usually kept separate from the main storyline. Early television programs were frequently packaged by the advertising agencies of individual sponsors. As this practice became less common in the late 1950s, Maxwell House, like most national brands, turned to "spot" advertising, with agencies creating sometimes long-running campaigns in support of their products.

One such 1970s campaign for Maxwell House featured the actress Margaret Hamilton, famous for playing the Wicked Witch of the West in the popular 1939 film The Wizard of Oz, as Cora, the general store owner who proudly announced that Maxwell House was the only brand she sold. Maxwell House was also a well-known sponsor of The Burns and Allen Show, during which time Maxwell House spots were incorporated into the plots of the radio scripts.

The Miss Guyana winner and Miss World runner-up Shakira Baksh, starred in a Brazilian television advertisement for Maxwell House in 1971, causing the actor Michael Caine to fall in love with her and to find her, whom she considered to be "the most beautiful woman he had ever seen." From a friend in the advertising business, he discovered that she lived only a few miles from him in London. The couple were married at the Algiers Hotel on 8 January 1973, and have one daughter.

=== Print advertisement ===
Along with television advertising, Maxwell House used various print campaigns, always featuring the tagline "good to the last drop". The publication of its Passover Haggadah by the Joseph Jacobs Advertising Agency, beginning in 1932, made Maxwell House a household name with many American Jewish families. This was part of a marketing strategy by advertiser Jacobs, who also hired an Orthodox rabbi to certify that the coffee bean was technically not "kitniyot" (because it was more like a berry than a bean) and was, consequently, kosher for Passover. Maxwell House was the first coffee roaster to target a Jewish demographic. The Maxwell House Haggadah was also the Haggadah of choice for the annual White House Passover Seder which President Barack Obama conducted during his presidency from 2009 to 2016.

=== Online ===
On September 25, 2025, Kraft Heinz announced that Maxwell House would temporarily rebrand as "Maxwell Apartment" to celebrate National Coffee Day on September 29, offered consumers with a 12-month "lease" of the coffee to stock up for the year. The Maxwell Apartment-branded coffee was only sold on Amazon as a package of four 27.5-ounce (780 g) canisters, and the regular Maxwell House-branded coffee was still available at grocery stores and other online stores.

== Manufacturing facilities ==
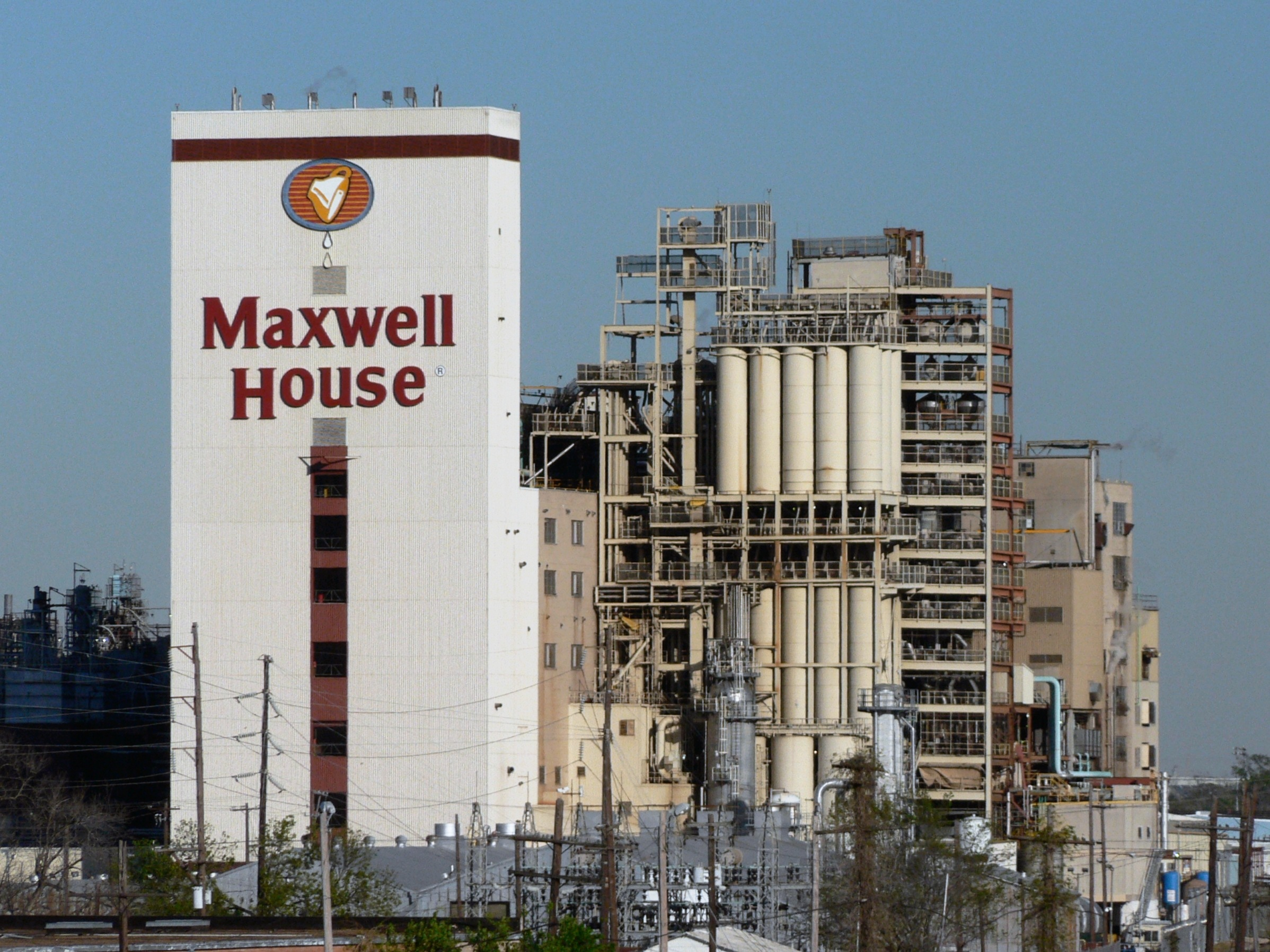
A former Maxwell House factory located in Houston, Texas

Of its major manufacturing facilities, the third was established by Maxwell House in Jacksonville, Florida. This continues as its single operating plant for the North American market today.

The company first produced its coffee in Hoboken, New Jersey; this plant closed in the early 1990s. Its enormous rooftop sign, proclaiming the brand name and a dripping coffee cup, was a landmark visible in New York City across the Hudson River. The plant was later sold and demolished, and a condominium was subsequently built on the site. According to Ken Burns' Baseball, the Hoboken site was built on the Elysian Fields in 1939, believed to be the site of the first organized baseball game.

The company added plants in Houston, Texas; and San Leandro, California.

Kraft Foods sold the Houston plant to Maximus Coffee Group LP in late 2006. In March 2007, the neon coffee cup sign that glowed over the city's east end was removed from the side of the 16-story coffee roaster building and the plant closed in 2018. The San Leandro plant closed in 2016 and was slated to become the site of a business park.

== See also ==
- Maxwell House Haggadah
