= SunTrust Plaza (Nashville) =

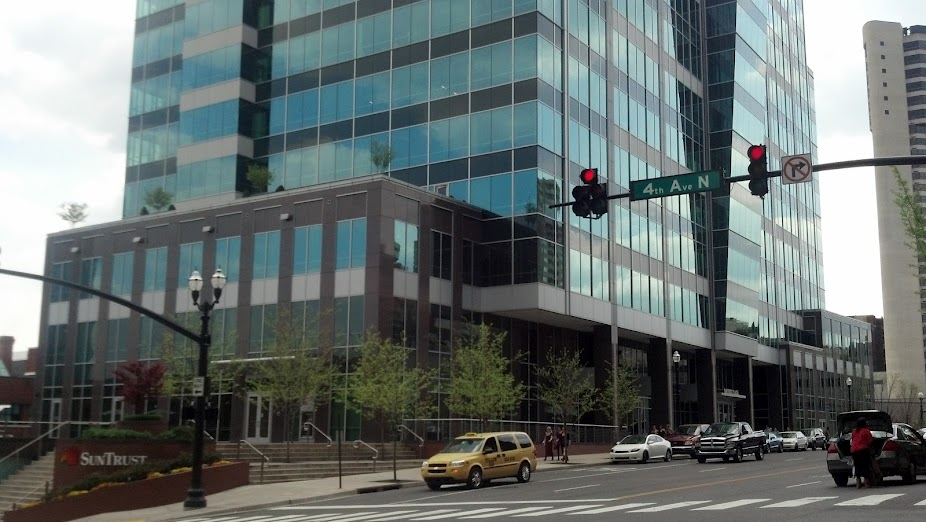
- Interactive map of the SunTrust Plaza area

General information
- Location: Nashville, Tennessee, 401 Commerce Street
- Coordinates: 36.1618°N 86.77857°W
- Current tenants: SunTrust Bank
- Completed: 2007

Technical details
- Floor count: 13

Design and construction
- Architect: Hastings Architecture Associates
- Main contractor: Brasfield & Gorrie

The SunTrust Plaza is a 13-story building located next to the Ryman Auditorium in Nashville, Tennessee. The building was completed in 2007 and features a Panera Bread restaurant and a fitness center.

== See also ==
- List of tallest buildings in Nashville
